= Bon Darreh =

Bon Darreh or Bondarreh or Bondareh or Bandareh (Persian: بن دره) may refer to:

- Bon Darreh, Fars
- Bondareh, Shiraz, Fars Province
- Bandareh, Kermanshah Province
- Bondarreh, Dana, Kohgiluyeh and Boyer-Ahmad Province
- Bon Darreh, Kohgiluyeh, Kohgiluyeh and Boyer-Ahmad Province
- Bandareh, West Azerbaijan
