= Deh Sorkh, Javanrud =

Deh Sorkh ده سرخ
- Village
- Location within Iran
- Coordinates: 34°50′19″N 46°24′42″E
- Country: Iran
- Province: Kermanshah
- County: Javanrud
- Bakhsh: Kalashi
- Rural District: Sharvineh

Population (2006)
  - Total: 130
- Time zone: UTC+3:30 (IRST)
  - Summer (DST): UTC+4:30 (IRDT)

Deh Sorkh (Persian: ده سرخ, Sorani Kurdish: دێ سوور) is a village in Sharvineh Rural District, Kalashi District, Javanrud County, Kermanshah Province, Iran. At the 2006 census, its population was 130, in 32 families.
