= Howz-e Seyyed Morad =

Howz-e Seyyed Morad حوض سيدمراد
- Village
- Location within Iran
- Coordinates: 34°49′41″N 46°20′56″E
- Country: Iran
- Province: Kermanshah
- County: Javanrud
- Bakhsh: Kalashi
- Rural District: Sharvineh

Population (2006)
  - Total: 96
- Time zone: UTC+3:30 (IRST)
  - Summer (DST): UTC+4:30 (IRDT)

Howz-e Seyyed Morad (Persian: حوض سيدمراد, also Romanized as Ḩowẕ-e Seyyed Morād and Howz-e Seyyed Morād; also known as Deh-e Seyyed Morād) is a village in Sharvineh Rural District, Kalashi District, Javanrud County, Kermanshah Province, Iran. At the 2006 census, its population was 96, in 20 families.
