= Darreh Bayan =

Darebayan دره‌بیان
- village
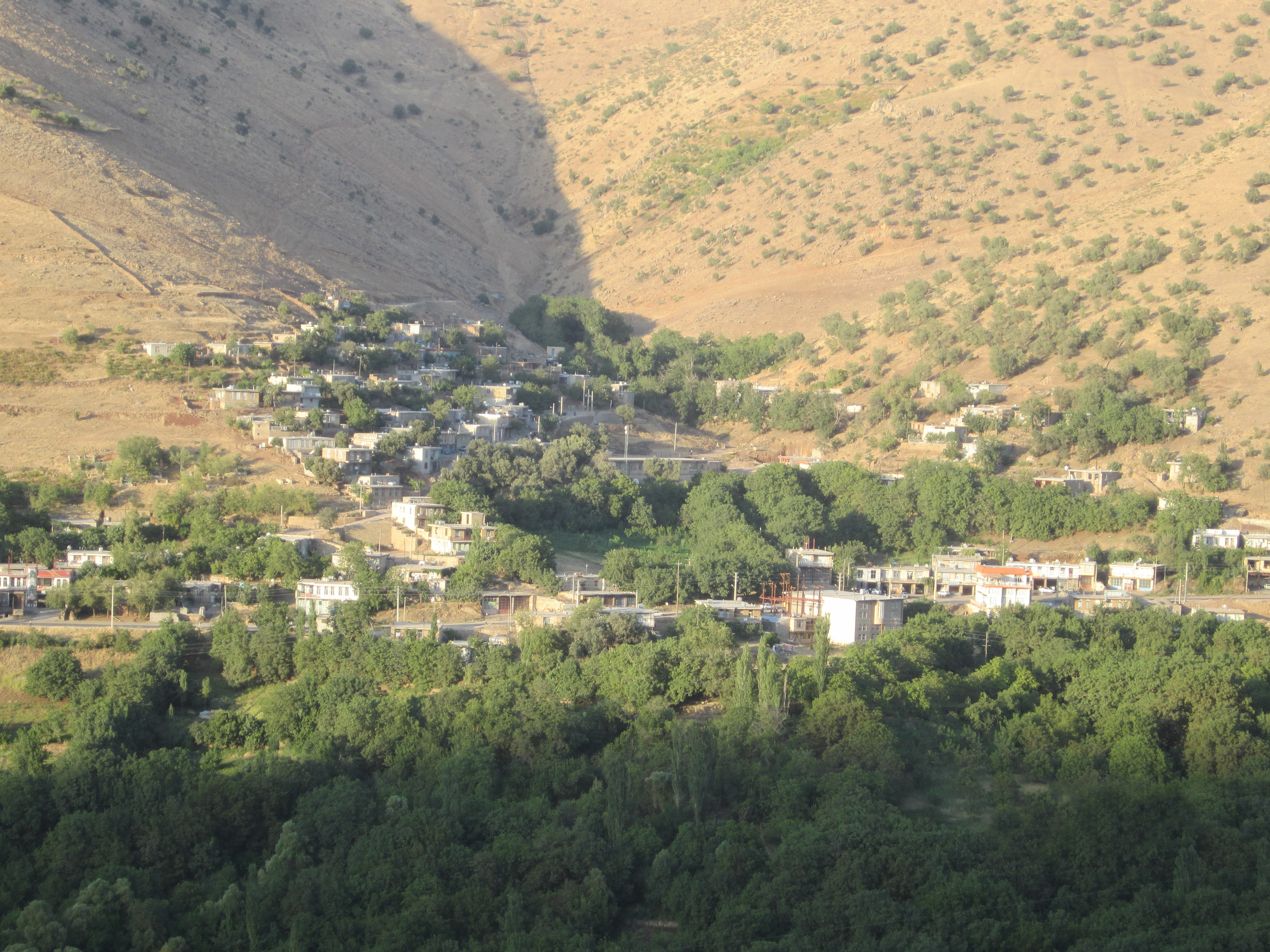

- Location within Iran
- Coordinates: 35°00′12″N 46°23′54″E
- Country: Iran
- Province: Kermanshah
- County: Paveh
- Bakhsh: Central
- Rural District: Shamshir

Population (2016)
  - Total: 1,700
- Time zone: UTC+3:30 (IRST)
  - Summer (DST): UTC+4:30 (IRDT)

Darebayan (Persian: دره‌بیان, also Kurdish as دەرەبەیان, and Derebeyan; also known as دەرەوەیان) is a village in Shamshir Rural District, in the Central District of Paveh County, Kermanshah Province, Iran. At the 2006 census, its population was 639, in 141 families.
