= Kimneh =

Keimneh كيمنه
- Village
- Location within Iran
- Coordinates: 35°15′40″N 46°09′22″E
- Country: Iran
- Province: Kermanshah
- County: Paveh
- Bakhsh: Nowsud
- Rural District: Sirvan

Population (2006)
  - Total: 151
- Time zone: UTC+3:30 (IRST)
  - Summer (DST): UTC+4:30 (IRDT)

Keimneh (Persian: كيمنه, also Romanized as Kīmneh; Sorani Kurdish: کەیمنە, romanized: Keymine; also known as Kaimina, Keymaneh, and Kīmāneh) is a village in Sirvan Rural District, Nowsud District, Paveh County, Kermanshah Province, Iran. At the 2006 census, its population was 151, in 39 families.
