= Dezavar =

Dezavar دزاور
- Village
- Location within Iran
- Coordinates: 35°12′13″N 46°12′19″E
- Country: Iran
- Province: Kermanshah
- County: Paveh
- Bakhsh: Nowsud
- Rural District: Sirvan

Population (2006)
  - Total: 200
- Time zone: UTC+3:30 (IRST)
  - Summer (DST): UTC+4:30 (IRDT)

Dezavar (Persian: دزاور, also Romanized as Dezāvar; also known as Dabjūr, Dījvar, and Dijwar) is a village in Sirvan Rural District, Nowsud District, Paveh County, Kermanshah Province, Iran. At the 2006 census, its population was 200, in 72 families.
