= Laqaleh =

Laqaleh لاقلعه
- Village
- Location within Iran
- Coordinates: 34°57′27″N 46°06′46″E
- Country: Iran
- Province: Kermanshah
- County: Javanrud
- Bakhsh: Kalashi
- Rural District: Kalashi

Population (2006)
  - Total: 75
- Time zone: UTC+3:30 (IRST)
  - Summer (DST): UTC+4:30 (IRDT)

Laqaleh (Persian: لاقلعه, also Romanized as Lāqal‘eh; also known as Lāqalā) is a village in Kalashi Rural District, Kalashi District, Javanrud County, Kermanshah Province, Iran. At the 2006 census, its population was 75, in 17 families.
