= Melah Rash =

Melah Rash مله رش
- Village
- Location within Iran
- Coordinates: 34°58′07″N 46°07′11″E
- Country: Iran
- Province: Kermanshah
- County: Javanrud
- Bakhsh: Kalashi
- Rural District: Kalashi

Population (2006)
  - Total: 211
- Time zone: UTC+3:30 (IRST)
  - Summer (DST): UTC+4:30 (IRDT)

Melah Rash (Persian: مله رش) is a village in Kalashi Rural District, Kalashi District, Javanrud County, Kermanshah Province, Iran. At the 2006 census, its population was 211, in 39 families.
