= Nuryab =

Nuryab نورياب
- Village
- Location within Iran
- Coordinates: 35°03′29″N 46°20′11″E
- Country: Iran
- Province: Kermanshah
- County: Paveh
- Bakhsh: Central
- Rural District: Howli

Population (2006)
  - Total: 966
- Time zone: UTC+3:30 (IRST)
  - Summer (DST): UTC+4:30 (IRDT)

Nuryab (Persian: نورياب, also Romanized as Nūryāb; also known as Nūr-i-Āb) is a village in Howli Rural District, in the Central District of Paveh County, Kermanshah Province, Iran. At the 2006 census, its population was 966, in 255 families.
