= Darmur =

Darmur درمور
- Village
- Location within Iran
- Coordinates: 35°01′45″N 46°20′18″E
- Country: Iran
- Province: Kermanshah
- County: Paveh
- Bakhsh: Central
- Rural District: Howli

Population (2006)
  - Total: 24
- Time zone: UTC+3:30 (IRST)
  - Summer (DST): UTC+4:30 (IRDT)

Darmur (Persian: درمور, also Romanized as Darmūr) is a village in Howli Rural District, in the Central District of Paveh County, Kermanshah Province, Iran. At the 2006 census, its population was 24, in 6 families.
