= Najjar, Kermanshah =

Najjar نجار
- Village
- Location within Iran
- Coordinates: 35°05′48″N 46°19′32″E
- Country: Iran
- Province: Kermanshah
- County: Paveh
- Bakhsh: Central
- Rural District: Howli

Population (2006)
  - Total: 290
- Time zone: UTC+3:30 (IRST)
  - Summer (DST): UTC+4:30 (IRDT)

Najjar (Persian: نجار, also Romanized as Najjār; also known as Najjārī) is a village in Howli Rural District, in the Central District of Paveh County, Kermanshah Province, Iran. At the 2006 census, its population was 290, in 65 families.
