= Hanulan =

Hanulan هانولان
- Village
- Location within Iran
- Coordinates: 34°54′00″N 46°15′00″E
- Country: Iran
- Province: Kermanshah
- County: Javanrud
- Bakhsh: Kalashi
- Rural District: Sharvineh

Population (2006)
  - Total: 72
- Time zone: UTC+3:30 (IRST)
  - Summer (DST): UTC+4:30 (IRDT)

Hanulan (Persian: هانولان, also Romanized as Hānūlān) is a village in Sharvineh Rural District, Kalashi District, Javanrud County, Kermanshah Province, Iran. At the 2006 census, its population was 72, in 17 families.
