= Merehta =

Merehta مره‌تا
- Village
- Location within Iran
- Coordinates: 34°58′34″N 46°04′03″E
- Country: Iran
- Province: Kermanshah
- County: Javanrud
- Bakhsh: Kalashi
- Rural District: Kalashi

Population (2006)
  - Total: 50
- Time zone: UTC+3:30 (IRST)
  - Summer (DST): UTC+4:30 (IRDT)

Merehta (Persian: مره‌تا, also Romanized as Merehtā) is a village in Kalashi Rural District, Kalashi District, Javanrud County, Kermanshah Province, Iran. At the 2006 census, its population was 50, in 8 families.
