= Nosmeh =

Neighborhood in Kermanshah province, Iran

Nosmeh Persian: نسمه
- Neighborhood
- Location within Iran
- Coordinates: 35°00′26″N 46°22′56″E
- Country: Iran
- Province: Kermanshah
- County: Paveh
- District: Central
- City: Paveh

Population (2016)
  - Total: 626
- Time zone: UTC+3:30 (IRST)

Nosmeh (Persian: نسمه) (Note: Also romanized as Nasmeh; also known as Nosmeh-ye ‘Olyā, Now Sām, Nowsmeh, and Nusmeh) is a neighborhood in the city of Paveh in the Central District of Paveh County, Kermanshah province, Iran.

== Demographics ==
=== Population ===
At the time of the 2006 National Census, Nosmeh's population was 476 in 131 households, when it was a village in Shamshir Rural District. The following census in 2011 counted 568 people in 166 households. The 2016 census measured the population of the village as 626 people in 186 households.

Nosmeh was annexed by the city of Paveh in 2021.
