= Sarkaran =

Neighborhood in Kermanshah province, Iran

Sarkaran Persian: سركران
- Neighborhood
- Location within Iran
- Coordinates: 35°00′48″N 46°23′02″E
- Country: Iran
- Province: Kermanshah
- County: Paveh
- District: Central
- City: Paveh

Population (2016)
  - Total: 626
- Time zone: UTC+3:30 (IRST)

Sarkaran (Persian: سركران) (Note: Also romanized as Sarkarān) is a neighborhood in the city of Paveh in the Central District of Paveh County, Kermanshah province, Iran.

== Demographics ==
=== Population ===
At the time of the 2006 National Census, Sarkaran's population was 275 in 65 households, when it was a village in Shamshir Rural District. The following census in 2011 counted 213 people in 64 households. The 2016 census measured the population of the village as 238 people in 70 households.

Sarkaran was annexed by the city of Paveh in 2021.
