= Iman, Iran =

Iman ايمان
- Village
- Location within Iran
- Coordinates: 35°01′22″N 45°59′12″E
- Country: Iran
- Province: Kermanshah
- County: Javanrud
- Bakhsh: Kalashi
- Rural District: Kalashi

Population (2006)
  - Total: 28
- Time zone: UTC+3:30 (IRST)
  - Summer (DST): UTC+4:30 (IRDT)

Iman (Persian: ايمان, also Romanized as Īmān) is a village in Kalashi Rural District, Kalashi District, Javanrud County, Kermanshah Province, Iran. At the 2006 census, its population was 28, in 7 families.
