= Aliabad-e Sasal =

Aliabad-e Sasal علي ابادساسل
- Village
- Location within Iran
- Coordinates: 34°48′20″N 46°24′41″E
- Country: Iran
- Province: Kermanshah
- County: Javanrud
- Bakhsh: Kalashi
- Rural District: Sharwineh

Population (2006)
  - Total: 249
- Time zone: UTC+3:30 (IRST)
  - Summer (DST): UTC+4:30 (IRDT)

Aliabad-e Sasal (Persian: علي آباد ساسل, Sorani Kurdish: عەلی ئاوای ساسەڵ، also Romanized as ‘Alīābād-e Sāsal; also known as ‘Alīābād and Sāsal) is a village in Sharwineh Rural District, Kalashi District, Javanrud County, Kermanshah Province, Iran. At the 2006 census, its population was 249, in 60 families.
