= Satiari =

Satiari ساتياري
- Village
- Location within Iran
- Coordinates: 34°58′47″N 46°17′49″E
- Country: Iran
- Province: Kermanshah
- County: Paveh
- Bakhsh: Bayangan
- Rural District: Shiveh Sar

Population (2006)
  - Total: 683
- Time zone: UTC+3:30 (IRST)
  - Summer (DST): UTC+4:30 (IRDT)

Satiari (Persian: ساتياري, also Romanized as Sātīārī and Sātī Yārī) is a village in Shiveh Sar Rural District, Bayangan District, Paveh County, Kermanshah Province, Iran. At the 2006 census, its population was 683, in 167 families.
