= Kama Darreh =

Kama Darreh کۆمەرە
- Village
- Location within Iran
- Coordinates: 35°06′25″N 46°18′05″E
- Country: Iran
- Province: Kermanshah
- County: Paveh
- Bakhsh: Central
- Rural District: Howli

Population (2006)
  - Total: 95
- Time zone: UTC+3:30 (IRST)
  - Summer (DST): UTC+4:30 (IRDT)

Kama Darreh (Persian: كمادره, also Romanized as Kamā Darreh and Komā Darreh; also known as Kūmeh Darreh) is a village in Howli Rural District, in the Central District of Paveh County, Kermanshah Province, Iran. At the 2006 census, its population was 95, in 23 families.
