= Vazli =

Vazli وزلي
- Village
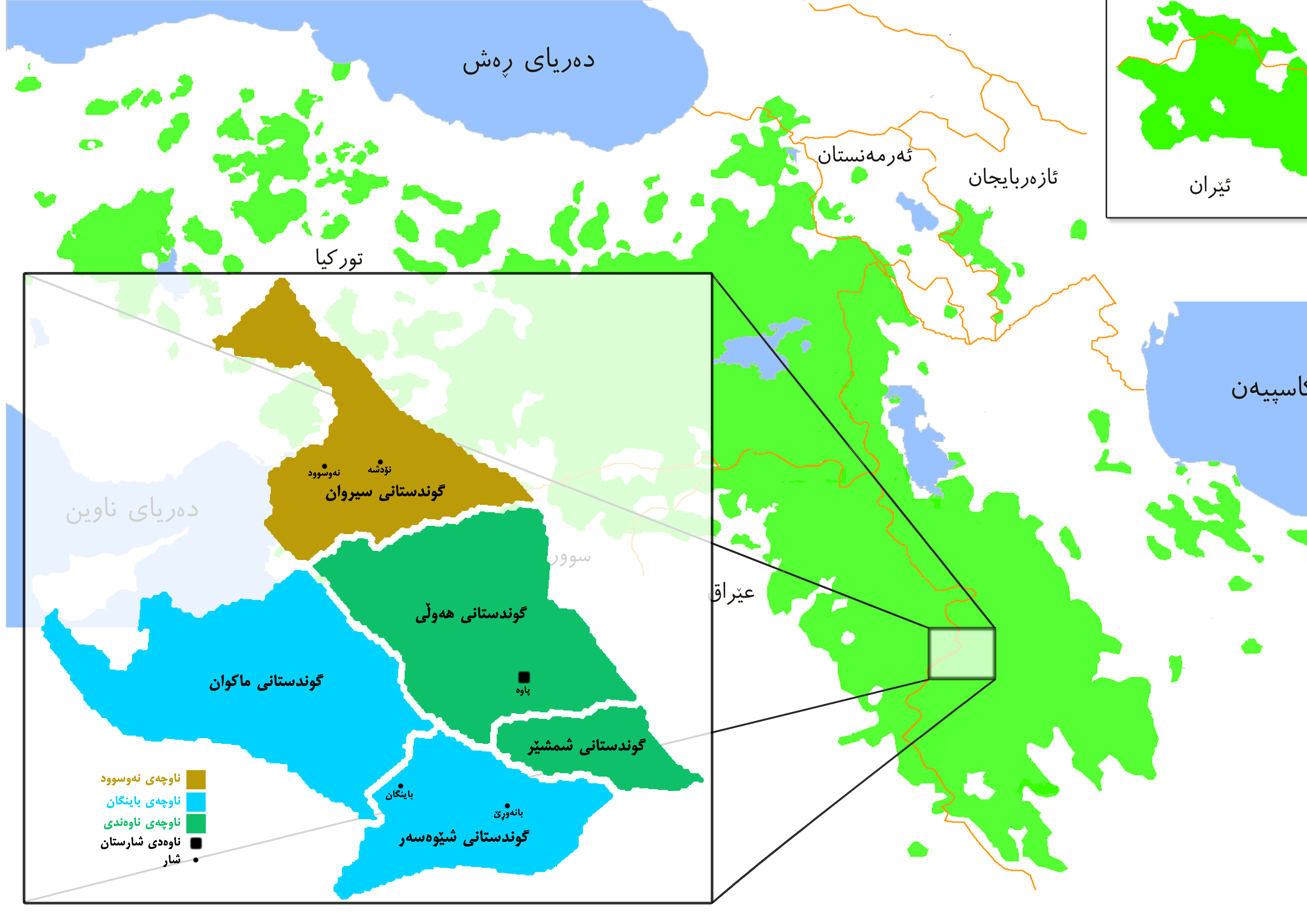
- Paveh city in Kurdistan (Kurdish areas)

- Location within Iran
- Coordinates: 35°09′52″N 46°13′11″E
- Country: Iran
- Province: Kermanshah
- County: Paveh
- Bakhsh: Nowsud
- Rural District: Sirvan

Population (2006)
  - Total: 123
- Time zone: UTC+3:30 (IRST)
  - Summer (DST): UTC+4:30 (IRDT)

Vazli (Persian: وزلي, also Romanized as Vazlī) is a village in Sirvan Rural District, Nowsud District, Paveh County, Kermanshah Province, Iran. At the 2006 census, its population was 123, in 34 families.
