= Dowleta =

Dowleta دولتا
- Village
- Location within Iran
- Coordinates: 34°58′30″N 46°04′18″E
- Country: Iran
- Province: Kermanshah
- County: Javanrud
- Bakhsh: Kalashi
- Rural District: Kalashi

Population (2006)
  - Total: 306
- Time zone: UTC+3:30 (IRST)
  - Summer (DST): UTC+4:30 (IRDT)

Dowleta (Persian: دولتا, Sorani Kurdish: دەوڵەتا, also Romanized as Dowletā) is a village that is located in the Kalashi Rural District of Javanrud County in Kermanshah Province, Iran. At the 2006 census, its population was 306, in 58 families.
