= Qalaji =

Qalaji قلاجي
- Village
- Location within Iran
- Coordinates: 34°58′08″N 46°05′39″E
- Country: Iran
- Province: Kermanshah
- County: Javanrud
- Bakhsh: Kalashi
- Rural District: Kalashi

Population (2006)
  - Total: 529
- Time zone: UTC+3:30 (IRST)
  - Summer (DST): UTC+4:30 (IRDT)

Qalaji (Persian: قلاجي, also Romanized as Qalājī; also known as Qalājeh, Qalājeh-ye Soflá, and Qal‘ehjeh) is a village in Kalashi Rural District, Kalashi District, Javanrud County, Kermanshah Province, Iran. At the 2006 census, its population was 529, in 110 families.
