= Geli, Kermanshah =

Geli گلي
- Village
- Location within Iran
- Coordinates: 34°49′09″N 46°25′36″E
- Country: Iran
- Province: Kermanshah
- County: Javanrud
- Bakhsh: Kalashi
- Rural District: Sharwineh

Population (2006)
  - Total: 44
- Time zone: UTC+3:30 (IRST)
  - Summer (DST): UTC+4:30 (IRDT)

Geli (Persian: گلي, Sorani Kurdish: گلی، also Romanized as Gelī) is a village in Sharwineh Rural District, Kalashi District, Javanrud County, Kermanshah Province, Iran. At the 2006 census, its population was 44, in 8 families.
