= Mazidi =

Mazidi مزيدي
- Village
- Location within Iran
- Coordinates: 34°58′58″N 46°22′48″E
- Country: Iran
- Province: Kermanshah
- County: Paveh
- Bakhsh: Bayangan
- Rural District: Shiveh Sar

Population (2006)
  - Total: 180
- Time zone: UTC+3:30 (IRST)
  - Summer (DST): UTC+4:30 (IRDT)

Mazidi (Persian: مزيدي, also Romanized as Mazīdī) is a village in Shiveh Sar Rural District, Bayangan District, Paveh County, Kermanshah Province, Iran. At the 2006 census, its population was 180, in 45 families.
