= Kelash Hush =

Kelash Hush كلاش هوش
- Village
- Location within Iran
- Coordinates: 34°55′28″N 46°12′48″E
- Country: Iran
- Province: Kermanshah
- County: Javanrud
- Bakhsh: Kalashi
- Rural District: Kalashi

Population (2006)
  - Total: 513
- Time zone: UTC+3:30 (IRST)
  - Summer (DST): UTC+4:30 (IRDT)

Kelash Hush (Persian: كلاش هوش, also Romanized as Kelāsh Hūsh) is a village in Kalashi Rural District, Kalashi District, Javanrud County, Kermanshah Province, Iran. At the 2006 census, its population was 513, in 98 families.
