= Beyuleh =

Beyuleh بيوله
- Village
- Location within Iran
- Coordinates: 34°50′19″N 46°20′08″E
- Country: Iran
- Province: Kermanshah
- County: Javanrud
- Bakhsh: Kalashi
- Rural District: Sharvineh

Population (2006)
  - Total: 434
- Time zone: UTC+3:30 (IRST)
  - Summer (DST): UTC+4:30 (IRDT)

Beyuleh (Persian: بيوله, Sorani Kurdish: بیوولە، also Romanized as Beyūleh) is a village in Sharwineh Rural District, Kalashi District, Javanrud County, Kermanshah Province, Iran. At the 2006 census, its population was 434, in 95 families.
