= Gerdak =

Gerdak گردك
- Village
- Location within Iran
- Coordinates: 34°48′08″N 46°23′13″E
- Country: Iran
- Province: Kermanshah
- County: Javanrud
- Bakhsh: Kalashi
- Rural District: Sharwineh

Population (2006)
  - Total: 111
- Time zone: UTC+3:30 (IRST)
  - Summer (DST): UTC+4:30 (IRDT)

Gerdak (Persian: گردك, Sorani Kurdish: گردەک) is a village in Sharwineh Rural District, Kalashi District, Javanrud County, Kermanshah Province, Iran. At the 2006 census, its population was 111, in 23 families.
