= Vara, Kermanshah =

Vara ورا
- Village
- Location within Iran
- Coordinates: 35°08′13″N 46°18′02″E
- Country: Iran
- Province: Kermanshah
- County: Paveh
- Bakhsh: Central
- Rural District: Howli

Population (2006)
  - Total: 290
- Time zone: UTC+3:30 (IRST)
  - Summer (DST): UTC+4:30 (IRDT)

Vara (Persian: ورا, also Romanized as Varā; also known as Gārā, Garra, and Vorrā’) is a village in Howli Rural District, in the Central District of Paveh County, Kermanshah Province, Iran. At the 2006 census, its population was 290, in 80 families.
