= Deh Tut-e Sofla =

Deh Tut-e Sofla ده توت سفلي
- Village
- Location within Iran
- Coordinates: 34°48′55″N 46°22′04″E
- Country: Iran
- Province: Kermanshah
- County: Javanrud
- Bakhsh: Kalashi
- Rural District: Sharvineh

Population (2006)
  - Total: 322
- Time zone: UTC+3:30 (IRST)
  - Summer (DST): UTC+4:30 (IRDT)

Deh Tut-e Sofla (Persian: دهتوت سفلي, Sorani Kurdish: دێ توی خوارو, also Romanized as Deh Tūt-e Soflá; also known as Dehtūī, Deh Tūt, Deh Tuveh, and Dehtū-ye Pā’īn) is a village in Sharwineh Rural District, Kalashi District, Javanrud County, Kermanshah Province, Iran. At the 2006 census, its population was 322, in 68 families.
