= Darreh Yab =

Darreh Yab دره ياب
- Village
- Location within Iran
- Coordinates: 34°59′56″N 46°01′41″E
- Country: Iran
- Province: Kermanshah
- County: Javanrud
- Bakhsh: Kalashi
- Rural District: Kalashi

Population (2006)
  - Total: 80
- Time zone: UTC+3:30 (IRST)
  - Summer (DST): UTC+4:30 (IRDT)

Darreh Yab (Persian: دره ياب, Sorani Kurdish: دەرە یاو, also Romanized as Darreh Yāb) is a village in Kalashi Rural District, Kalashi District, Javanrud County, Kermanshah Province, Iran. At the 2006 census, its population was 80, in 15 families.
