= Hossein Kohkan =

Iranian architect

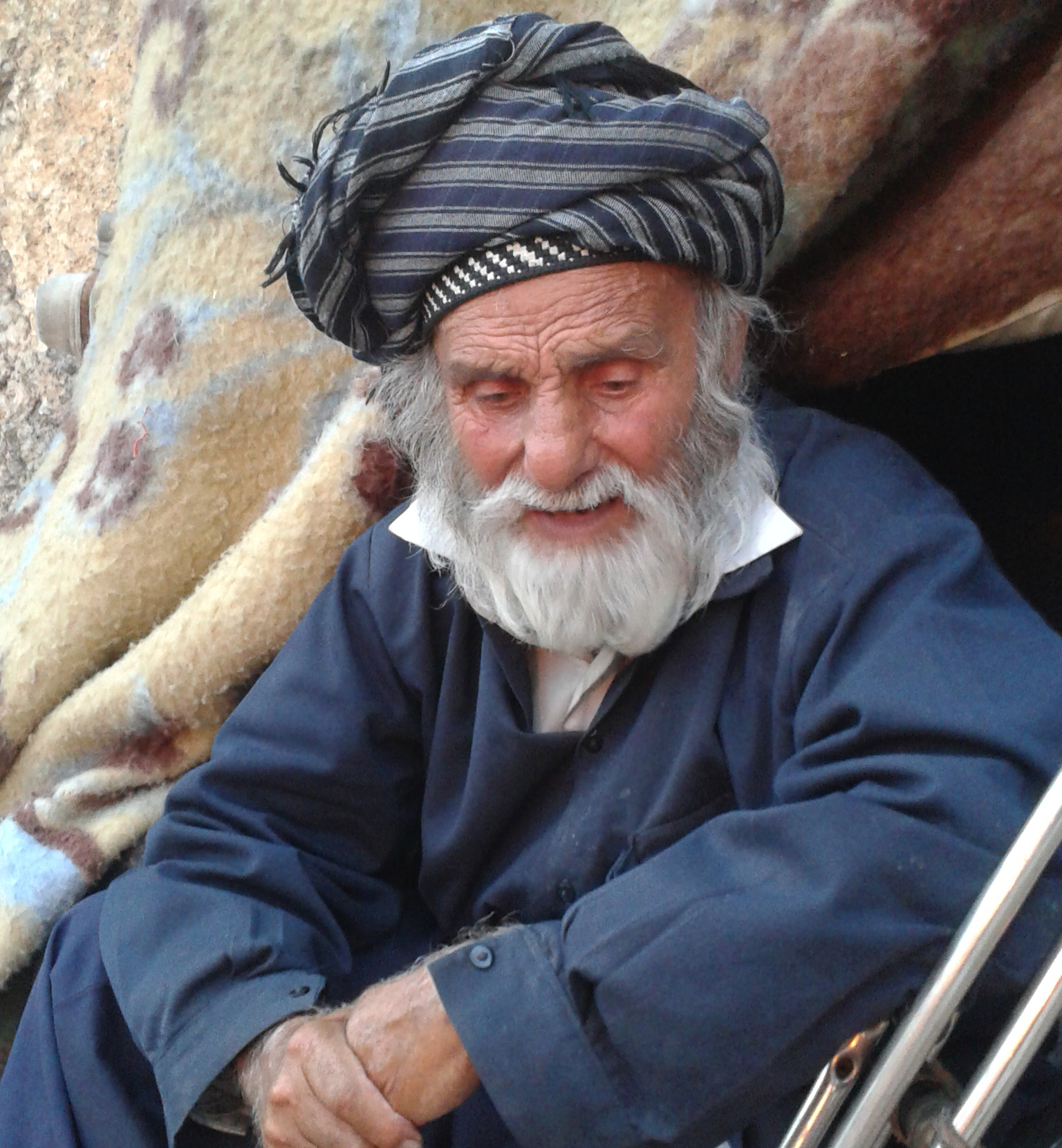
Khalo Hossein Kohkan in his cave

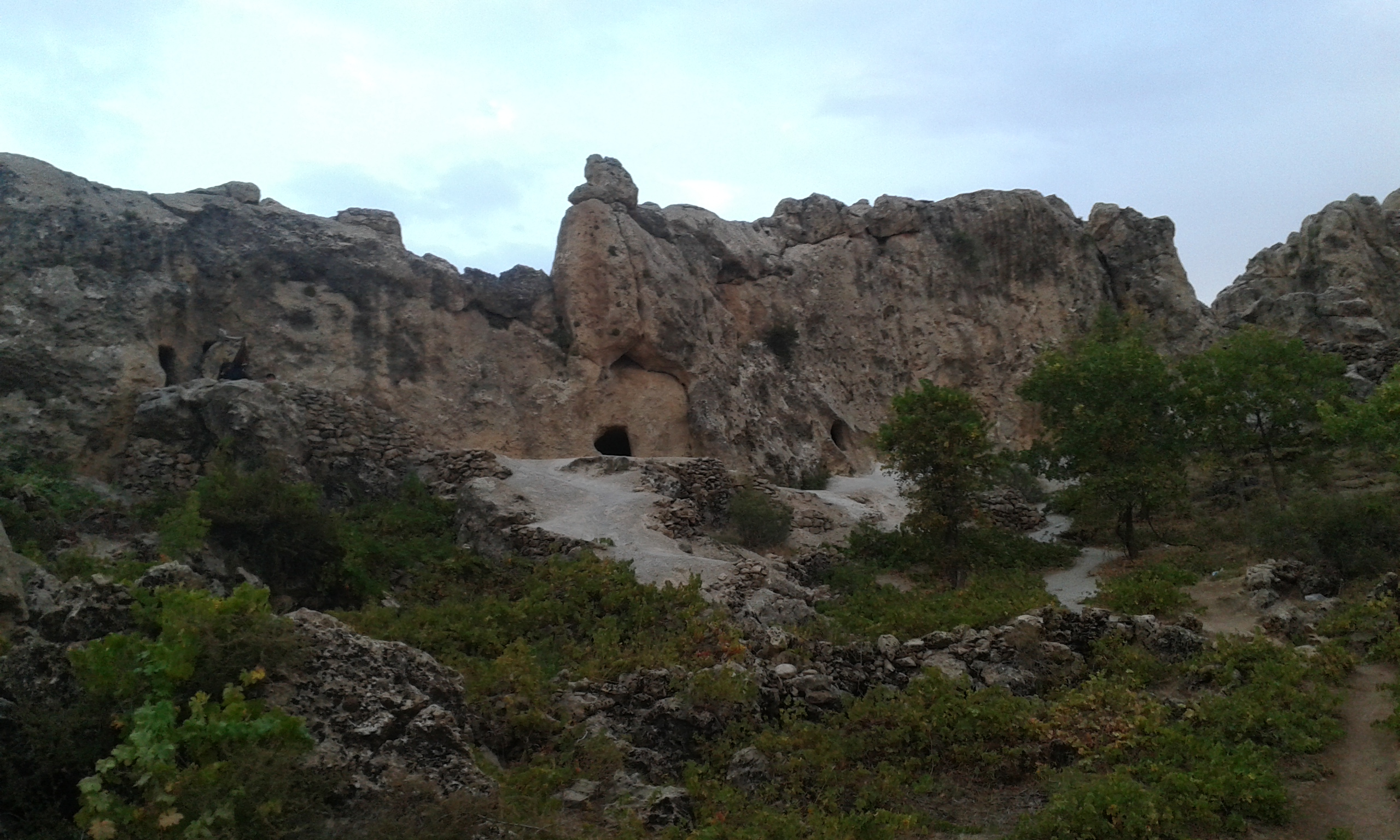
The stone cave of Hossein Kohkan

Hossein Osmani (Kurdish: حوسێن عوسمانی 28 September 1930 in Darvaleh-ye Pain, Kermanshah, Iran - 26 July 2016 in Banevreh, Kermanshah, Iran) also known as Khalo Hossein Kohkan (Kurdish: خاڵۆ حوسێن کۆکەن, romanized: Xalo Husên Koken) (in meaning Digging Mountain or Caveman) or Farhad the Second (Persian: فرهاد ثانی, فرهاد دوم) was an Iranian Kurd who left his village 21 years ago and started carving cliff rocks on a mountain near Banevreh City Of functions Paveh County in the Kermanshah province in Iran. He carved seven rooms in a rocky mountain, as well as his own grave. He was given the title of Farhad II, a fictional figure in the Iranian literature who agreed to carve a mountain after his love-rival, one of the Iranian kings, sends him on exile.
