= Sorkheban-e Sofla =

Sorkheban-e Sofla سرخ بان سفلي
- Village
- Location within Iran
- Coordinates: 34°51′20″N 46°20′11″E
- Country: Iran
- Province: Kermanshah
- County: Javanrud
- Bakhsh: Kalashi
- Rural District: Sharvineh

Population (2006)
  - Total: 268
- Time zone: UTC+3:30 (IRST)
  - Summer (DST): UTC+4:30 (IRDT)

Sorkheban-e Sofla (Persian: سرخ بان سفلي, also Romanized as Sorkhebān-e Soflá) is a village in Sharvineh Rural District, Kalashi District, Javanrud County, Kermanshah Province, Iran. At the 2006 census, its population was 268, in 55 families.
