= Balahi =

Balahi بله اي
- Village
- Location within Iran
- Coordinates: 34°58′03″N 46°20′21″E
- Country: Iran
- Province: Kermanshah
- County: Paveh
- Bakhsh: Bayangan
- Rural District: Shiveh Sar

Population (2006)
  - Total: 29
- Time zone: UTC+3:30 (IRST)
  - Summer (DST): UTC+4:30 (IRDT)

Balahi (Persian: بله اي, also Romanized as Balahī; also known as Bala‘ī, Bal’ī, and Bele’ī) is a village in Shiveh Sar Rural District, Bayangan District, Paveh County, Kermanshah Province, Iran. At the 2006 census, its population was 29, in 7 families.
