= Narvi, Iran =

Narvi نروي
- Village
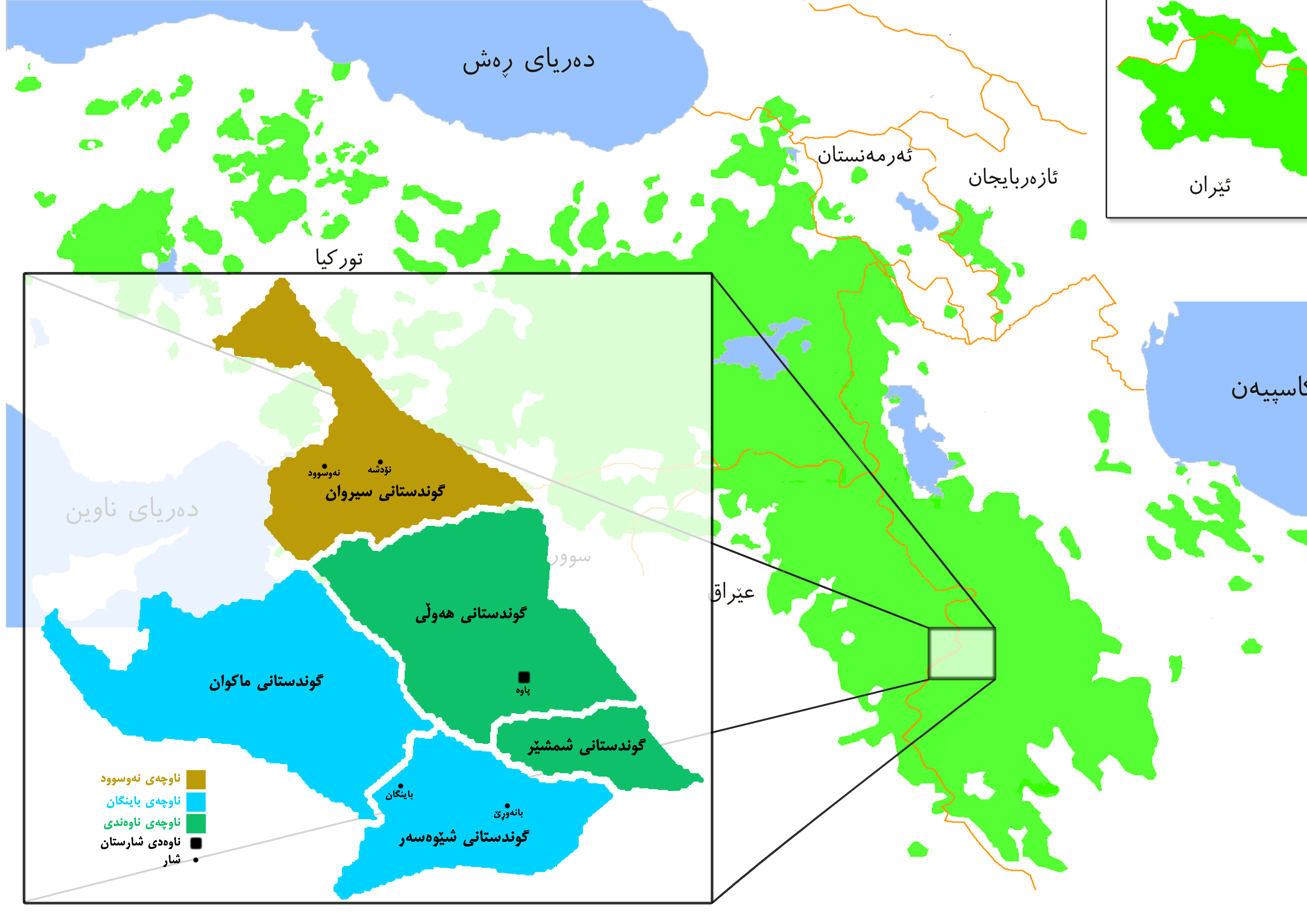

- Location within Iran
- Coordinates: 35°09′13″N 46°14′15″E
- Country: Iran
- Province: Kermanshah
- County: Paveh
- Bakhsh: Nowsud
- Rural District: Sirvan

Population (2006)
  - Total: 455
- Time zone: UTC+3:30 (IRST)
  - Summer (DST): UTC+4:30 (IRDT)

Narvi (Persian: نروي, also Romanized as Narvī) is a village in Sirvan Rural District, Nowsud District, Paveh County, Kermanshah Province, Iran. At the 2006 census, its population was 455, in 132 families.
