= Tashar, Kermanshah =

Tashar تشار
- Village
- Location within Iran
- Coordinates: 35°09′19″N 46°12′35″E
- Country: Iran
- Province: Kermanshah
- County: Paveh
- Bakhsh: Nowsud
- Rural District: Sirvan

Population (2006)
  - Total: 280
- Time zone: UTC+3:30 (IRST)
  - Summer (DST): UTC+4:30 (IRDT)

Tashar (Persian: تشار, also Romanized as Tashār) is a village in Sirvan Rural District, Nowsud District, Paveh County, Kermanshah Province, Iran. At the 2006 census, its population was 280, in 75 families.
