= Guyaleh, Kermanshah =

Guyaleh گويله
- Village
- Location within Iran
- Coordinates: 34°54′53″N 46°13′19″E
- Country: Iran
- Province: Kermanshah
- County: Javanrud
- Bakhsh: Kalashi
- Rural District: Kalashi

Population (2006)
  - Total: 139
- Time zone: UTC+3:30 (IRST)
  - Summer (DST): UTC+4:30 (IRDT)

Guyaleh (Persian: گويله, also Romanized as Gūyaleh; also known as Gavāleh Kalāsh, Gavīleh, Govaleh, Kavīleh, and Kovīleh) is a village in Kalashi Rural District, Kalashi District, Javanrud County, Kermanshah Province, Iran. At the 2006 census, its population was 139, in 27 families.
