= Lulem, Kermanshah =

Lulem لولم
- Village
- Location within Iran
- Coordinates: 34°53′14″N 46°12′14″E
- Country: Iran
- Province: Kermanshah
- County: Javanrud
- Bakhsh: Kalashi
- Rural District: Kalashi

Population (2006)
  - Total: 635
- Time zone: UTC+3:30 (IRST)
  - Summer (DST): UTC+4:30 (IRDT)

Lulem (Persian: لولم, also Romanized as Lūlem) is a village in Kalashi Rural District, Kalashi District, Javanrud County, Kermanshah Province, Iran. At the 2006 census, its population was 635, in 133 families.
