= Sorkheban-e Olya =

Sorkheban-e Olya سرخ بان عليا
- Village
- Location within Iran
- Coordinates: 34°50′49″N 46°21′32″E
- Country: Iran
- Province: Kermanshah
- County: Javanrud
- Bakhsh: Kalashi
- Rural District: Sharvineh

Population (2006)
  - Total: 67
- Time zone: UTC+3:30 (IRST)
  - Summer (DST): UTC+4:30 (IRDT)

Sorkheban-e Olya (Persian: سرخ بان عليا, also Romanized as Sorkhebān-e ‘Olyā; also known as Sorkhbān) is a village in Sharvineh Rural District, Kalashi District, Javanrud County, Kermanshah Province, Iran. At the 2006 census, its population was 67, in 17 families.
