= Khaneqah, Kermanshah =

Village in Kermanshah province, Iran

Khaneqah Persian: خانقاه
- Village
- Location within Iran
- Coordinates: 35°01′47″N 46°21′11″E
- Country: Iran
- Province: Kermanshah
- County: Paveh
- District: Central
- Rural District: Howli

Population (2016)
  - Total: 1,305
- Time zone: UTC+3:30 (IRST)

Khaneqah (Persian: خانقاه) (Note: Also romanized as Khāneqāh and Khānqāh; also known as Khāngāh) is a village in, and the capital of, Howli Rural District of the Central District of Paveh County, Kermanshah province, Iran.

== Demographics ==
=== Population ===
At the time of the 2006 National Census, the village's population was 1,463 in 394 households. The following census in 2011 counted 1,414 people in 433 households. The 2016 census measured the population of the village as 1,305 people in 424 households.
