= Neyesaneh =

Village in Kermanshah province, Iran

Neyesaneh Persian: نيسانه
- Village
- Location within Iran
- Coordinates: 35°09′16″N 46°11′33″E
- Country: Iran
- Province: Kermanshah
- County: Paveh
- District: Nowsud
- Rural District: Sirvan

Population (2016)
  - Total: 229
- Time zone: UTC+3:30 (IRST)

Neyesaneh (Persian: نيسانه) (Note: Also romanized as Neyesāneh; also known as Neyestāneh) is a village in, and the capital of, Sirvan Rural District of Nowsud District, Paveh County, Kermanshah province, Iran.

== Demographics ==
=== Population ===
At the time of the 2006 National Census, the village's population was 229 in 56 households. The following census in 2011 counted 202 people in 63 households. The 2016 census measured the population of the village as 229 people in 78 households.
