= Guyileh =

Guyileh or Guyaleh or Gavileh or Govileh (Persian: گويله) may refer to:

- Guyaleh, Kermanshah
- Guyileh, Khuzestan
- Gavileh, Kurdistan
