= Mir Abdoli-ye Zarrin Choqa =

Mir Abdoli-ye Zarrin Choqa ميرعبدلي زرين چيا
- Village
- Location within Iran
- Coordinates: 34°56′25″N 46°22′53″E
- Country: Iran
- Province: Kermanshah
- County: Paveh
- Bakhsh: Bayangan
- Rural District: Shiveh Sar

Population (2006)
  - Total: 408
- Time zone: UTC+3:30 (IRST)
  - Summer (DST): UTC+4:30 (IRDT)

Mir Abdoli-ye Zarrin Choqa (Persian: ميرعبدلي زرين چيا, also Romanized as Mīr ‘Abdolī-ye Zarrīn Choqā; also known as Mīr ‘Abdolī) is a village in Shiveh Sar Rural District, Bayangan District, Paveh County, Kermanshah Province, Iran. At the 2006 census, its population was 408, in 92 families.
