= Shamshir, Iran =

Village in Kermanshah province, Iran

Shamshir Persian: شمشير
- Village
- Location within Iran
- Coordinates: 34°59′31″N 46°25′05″E
- Country: Iran
- Province: Kermanshah
- County: Paveh
- District: Central
- Rural District: Shamshir

Population (2016)
  - Total: 2,222
- Time zone: UTC+3:30 (IRST)

Shamshir (Persian: شمشير) (Note: Also romanized as Shamshīr) is a village in, and the capital of, Shamshir Rural District of the Central District of Paveh County, Kermanshah province, Iran. The previous capital of the rural district was the village of Churizhi, now a neighborhood in the city of Paveh.

== Demographics ==
=== Population ===
At the time of the 2006 National Census, the village's population was 2,097 in 493 households. The following census in 2011 counted 2,189 people in 592 households. The 2016 census measured the population of the village as 2,222 people in 639 households.
