= Tin, Kermanshah =

Tin تين
- Village
- Location within Iran
- Coordinates: 35°00′23″N 46°15′49″E
- Country: Iran
- Province: Kermanshah
- County: Paveh
- Bakhsh: Bayangan
- Rural District: Makvan

Population (2006)
  - Total: 447
- Time zone: UTC+3:30 (IRST)
  - Summer (DST): UTC+4:30 (IRDT)

Tin (Persian: تين, also Romanized as Tīn) is a village in Makvan Rural District, Bayangan District, Paveh County, Kermanshah Province, Iran. At the 2006 census, its population was 447, in 120 families.

== Geography ==
Tin is located in the desert, on a mountain slope. It is 8 miles away from the Iraqi border.
