= Kolur, Kermanshah =

Kolur كلور
- Village
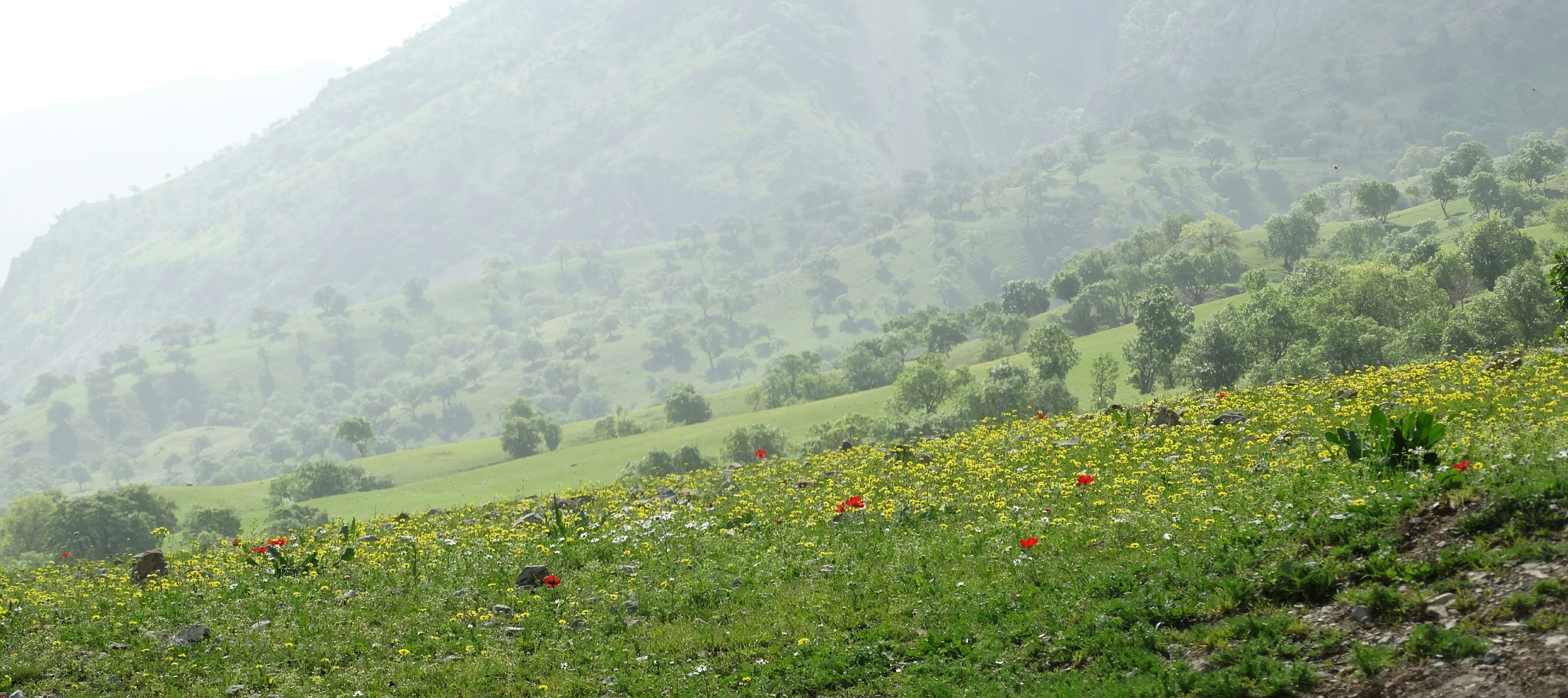
- kolur
- Interactive map of Kolur
- Location within Iran
- Coordinates: 35°03′17″N 45°57′22″E
- Country: Iran
- Province: Kermanshah
- County: Javanrud
- Bakhsh: Kalashi
- Rural District: Kalashi

Population (2006)
  - Total: 106
- Time zone: UTC+3:30 (IRST)
  - Summer (DST): UTC+4:30 (IRDT)

Kolur (Persian: كلور, also Romanized as Kolūr) is a village in Kalashi Rural District, Kalashi District, Javanrud County, Kermanshah Province, Iran. At the 2006 census, its population was 106, in 21 families.
