= Laran-e Olya =

Laran-e Olya لاران عليا
- Village
- Location within Iran
- Coordinates: 34°56′20″N 46°21′46″E
- Country: Iran
- Province: Kermanshah
- County: Paveh
- Bakhsh: Bayangan
- Rural District: Shiveh Sar

Population (2006)
  - Total: 126
- Time zone: UTC+3:30 (IRST)
  - Summer (DST): UTC+4:30 (IRDT)

Laran-e Olya (Persian: لاران عليا, also Romanized as Larān-e ‘Olyā and Lārān-e ‘Olyā) is a village in Shiveh Sar Rural District, Bayangan District, Paveh County, Kermanshah Province, Iran. At the 2006 census, its population was 126, in 28 families.
