= Zardui =

Village in Kermanshah province, Iran

Zardooi Persian: زردويي
- Village
- Interactive map of Zardooi
- Coordinates: 35°01′09″N 46°13′49″E
- Country: Iran
- Province: Kermanshah
- County: Paveh
- District: Bayangan
- Rural District: Makvan

Population (2016)
  - Total: 743
- Time zone: UTC+3:30 (IRST)

Zardui (Persian: زردويي) (Note: Also romanized as Zardoui and Zardū’ī; also known as Ravān, Ravān Zardū’ī, Ravān-e Zardowī, Ravān-e Zardū’ī, and Rawān Zarūdeh) is a village in Makvan Rural District of Bayangan District, Paveh County, Kermanshah province, Iran.

== Demographics ==
=== Population ===
At the time of the 2006 National Census, the village's population was 1,078 in 258 households. The following census in 2011 counted 920 people in 252 households. The 2016 census measured the population of the village as 743 people in 207 households. It was the most populous village in its rural district.

== Archaeology ==
A Paleolithic site is recorded in the vicinity of the village where Paleolithic hunters used it for seasonal or short-term habitation during a period that archaeologists call Middle Paleolithic (40,000-200,000 years ago).(Arkeonews)
