= Desheh =

Village in Kermanshah province, Iran

Desheh Persian: دشه
- Village
- Location within Iran
- Coordinates: 35°04′05″N 46°16′51″E
- Country: Iran
- Province: Kermanshah
- County: Paveh
- District: Central
- Rural District: Howli

Population (2016)
  - Total: 1,549
- Time zone: UTC+3:30 (IRST)

Desheh (Persian: دشه) (Note: Also romanized as Deshah; also known as Disheh) is a village in Howli Rural District of the Central District of Paveh County, Kermanshah province, Iran. The village has improved significantly in recent years. One of its developments is the asphalt of main roads that was completed in August 2017.

== Demographics ==
=== Population ===
At the time of the 2006 National Census, the village's population was 1,478 in 358 households. The following census in 2011 counted 1,376 people in 382 households. The 2016 census measured the population of the village as 1,549 people in 476 households. It was the most populous village in its rural district.
