= Bandareh =

Bandareh بندره
- Village
- Location within Iran
- Coordinates: 35°01′00″N 46°21′00″E
- Country: Iran
- Province: Kermanshah
- County: Paveh
- Bakhsh: Central
- Rural District: Shamshir

Population (2006)
  - Total: 275
- Time zone: UTC+3:30 (IRST)
  - Summer (DST): UTC+4:30 (IRDT)

Bandareh (Persian: بندره; also known as Beyn Darreh) is a village in Shamshir Rural District, in the Central District of Paveh County, Kermanshah Province, Iran. At the 2006 census, its population was 275, in 73 families.
