= Bani Lavan =

Village in Kermanshah province, Iran

Bani Lavan Persian: باني لوان
- Village
- Location within Iran
- Coordinates: 34°58′48″N 46°03′23″E
- Country: Iran
- Province: Kermanshah
- County: Javanrud
- District: Kalashi
- Rural District: Kalashi

Population (2016)
  - Total: 906
- Time zone: UTC+3:30 (IRST)

Bani Lavan (Persian: باني لوان) (Note: Also romanized as Bānī Lavān; also known as Bānī Lavān Tājez and Bānī Lavān-e Tāyjūz (Sorani Kurdish: باني لەوان تایجۆز and باني لەوان)) is a village in Kalashi Rural District of Kalashi District, Javanrud County, Kermanshah province, Iran.

== Demographics ==
=== Population ===
At the time of the 2006 National Census, the village's population was 671 in 128 households. The following census in 2011 counted 824 people in 183 households. The 2016 census measured the population of the village as 906 people in 209 households. It was the most populous village in its rural district.
