= Churizhi =

Neighborhood in Kermanshah province, Iran

Churizhi Persian: چوریژی
- Neighborhood
- Location within Iran
- Coordinates: 35°00′59″N 46°22′57″E
- Country: Iran
- Province: Kermanshah
- County: Paveh
- District: Central
- City: Paveh

Population (2016)
  - Total: 2,717
- Time zone: UTC+3:30 (IRST)

Churizhi (Persian: چوریژی) (Note: Also romanized as Chūrīzhī; also known as Chūrzhī) is a neighborhood in the city of Paveh in the Central District of Paveh County, Kermanshah province, Iran. As a village, it was the capital of Shamshir Rural District until its capital was transferred to the village of Shamshir.

== Demographics ==
=== Population ===
At the time of the 2006 National Census, Churizhi's population was 1,858 in 456 households, when it was a village in Shamshir Rural District. The following census in 2011 counted 2,413 people in 695 households. The 2016 census measured the population of the village as 2,717 people in 833 households.

Churizhi was annexed by the city of Paveh in 2021.
