= Darvaleh-ye Bala =

Darvaleh-ye Bala دوروله بالا
- Village
- Location within Iran
- Coordinates: 35°03′24″N 45°58′00″E
- Country: Iran
- Province: Kermanshah
- County: Javanrud
- Bakhsh: Kalashi
- Rural District: Kalashi

Population (2006)
  - Total: 33
- Time zone: UTC+3:30 (IRST)
  - Summer (DST): UTC+4:30 (IRDT)

Darvaleh-ye Bala (Persian: دوروله بالا, Sorani Kurdish: دەروەلەی ژوورو also Romanized as Darvaleh-ye Bālā; also known as Darvaleh-ye ‘Olyā) is a village in Kalashi Rural District, Kalashi District, Javanrud County, Kermanshah Province, Iran. At the 2006 census, its population was 33, in 9 families.
