= Hani Garmaleh =

Village in Kermanshah province, Iran

Hani Garmaleh Persian: هاني گرمله
- Village
- Location within Iran
- Coordinates: 35°14′45″N 46°08′18″E
- Country: Iran
- Province: Kermanshah
- County: Paveh
- District: Nowsud
- Rural District: Sirvan

Population (2016)
  - Total: 869
- Time zone: UTC+3:30 (IRST)

Hani Garmaleh (Persian: هاني گرمله) (Note: Also romanized as Hānī Garmaleh; also known as Kānī Garmaleh) is a village in Sirvan Rural District of Nowsud District, Paveh County, Kermanshah province, Iran.

== Demographics ==
=== Population ===
At the time of the 2006 National Census, the village's population was 386 in 118 households. The following census in 2011 counted 605 people in 192 households. The 2016 census measured the population of the village as 869 people in 288 households. It was the most populous village in its rural district.
