= Golbaghi, Kermanshah =

Golbaghi گل باغي
- Village
- Location within Iran
- Coordinates: 34°49′21″N 46°25′17″E
- Country: Iran
- Province: Kermanshah
- County: Javanrud
- Bakhsh: Kalashi
- Rural District: Sharvineh

Population (2006)
  - Total: 147
- Time zone: UTC+3:30 (IRST)
  - Summer (DST): UTC+4:30 (IRDT)

Golbaghi (Persian: گل باغي, also Romanized as Golbāghī) is a village in Sharvineh Rural District, Kalashi District, Javanrud County, Kermanshah Province, Iran. At the 2006 census, its population was 147, in 33 families.
