= Arit =

Arit اريت
- Village
- Location within Iran
- Coordinates: 34°58′28″N 46°24′14″E
- Country: Iran
- Province: Kermanshah
- County: Paveh
- Bakhsh: Bayangan
- Rural District: Shiveh Sar

Population (2006)
  - Total: 146
- Time zone: UTC+3:30 (IRST)
  - Summer (DST): UTC+4:30 (IRDT)

Arit (Persian: اريت, also Romanized as Ārīt; also known as Āret) is a village in Shiveh Sar Rural District, Bayangan District, Paveh County, Kermanshah province, Iran. At the 2006 census, its population was 146, in 31 families.
