= Sefid Ab, Kermanshah =

Sefid Ab سفيداب
- Village
- Location within Iran
- Coordinates: 34°59′19″N 46°14′06″E
- Country: Iran
- Province: Kermanshah
- County: Paveh
- Bakhsh: Bayangan
- Rural District: Makvan

Population (2006)
  - Total: 54
- Time zone: UTC+3:30 (IRST)
  - Summer (DST): UTC+4:30 (IRDT)

Sefid Ab (Persian: سفيداب, also Romanized as Sefīd Āb) is a village in Makvan Rural District, Bayangan District, Paveh County, Kermanshah Province, Iran. At the 2006 census, its population was 54, in 15 families.
