= Gandab-e Vosta =

Gandab-e Vosta گنداب وسطي
- Village
- Location within Iran
- Coordinates: 34°51′20″N 46°20′11″E
- Country: Iran
- Province: Kermanshah
- County: Javanrud
- Bakhsh: Kalashi
- Rural District: Sharwineh

Population (2006)
  - Total: 275
- Time zone: UTC+3:30 (IRST)
  - Summer (DST): UTC+4:30 (IRDT)

Gandab-e Vosta (Persian: گنداب وسطي, Sorani Kurdish: گوندئاوی ناوەڕاس, also Romanized as Gandāb-e Vosţá; also known as Gandāb, Gonbad Āb, and Gunāb) is a village in Sharwineh Rural District, Kalashi District, Javanrud County, Kermanshah Province, Iran. At the 2006 census, its population was 275, in 60 families.
