= Durisan =

Neighborhood in Kermanshah province, Iran

Durisan Persian: دوريسان
- Neighborhood
- Location within Iran
- Coordinates: 35°01′30″N 46°22′22″E
- Country: Iran
- Province: Kermanshah
- County: Paveh
- District: Central
- City: Paveh

Population (2016)
  - Total: 3,500
- Time zone: UTC+3:30 (IRST)

Durisan (Persian: دوريسان) (Note: Also romanized as Dūrīsān; also known as Dorīzān)

Durisan is one of the historical, cultural, and ethnic regions affiliated with Paveh County in Kermanshah Province, located within the geographical-historical area of Hawraman Lahoon. Despite its ethnic affiliation with the large Jaff tribe, this region is distinct from other Jaff-inhabited areas in Iranian and Iraqi Kurdistan. This distinction is evident not only in linguistic aspects but also in cultural, social, and even religious dimensions.

The native population of Durisan, from a linguistic perspective, speaks a unique dialect known as Pavehi Sorani, a variant of Sorani Kurdish that deeply intertwines lexically and syntactically with the Hawrami language. This linguistic blend not only reflects the historical interaction between the Jaf and Hawrami peoples in the Lahoon region but also represents a living reality of the fluid and multilayered identity of the people of this area. Here, being Jaf does not solely define the entirety of one’s ethnic, linguistic, and cultural identity, but is enriched through layers of Hawrami influence.

Historically, Durisan has always been one of the cultural and social centers of the Hawraman Lahoon region, with several prominent families residing there. The oldest families of Durisan include the Mirvani, Shahmoradi, and Naqshbandi clans; the descendants of Haji Mirza, Darvish Faraj, Haqmorad, and Shahmorad; the descendants of Khodamorad; the Ghafouri and Mohammad Moradi families (descendants of Mohammad and of Abdolkarim—son of Abdolghafour, son of Mohammad Morad); and the Alinejad and Veisi families (descendants of Abdolkhalegh and of Abdolkarim—sons of Abdolrahman, son of Ali). Khodamorad, Mohammad Morad, and Ali were the sons of Valadkhan (son of Alireza) and were originally of the Yazdan-Bakhshi lineage; having migrated long ago from warmer lowland regions to Durisan, they rank among the village's oldest families.

== Demographics ==
=== Population ===
At the time of the 2006 National Census, Durisan's population was 3,002 in 766 households, when it was a village in Shamshir Rural District. The following census in 2011 counted 2,763 people in 787 households. The 2016 census measured the population of the village as 3,500 people in 1,042 households. It was the most populous village in its rural district.

Durisan was annexed by the city of Paveh in 2021.
