= Shorkan =

Shorkan شركان
- Village
- Location within Iran
- Coordinates: 35°09′22″N 46°15′43″E
- Country: Iran
- Province: Kermanshah
- County: Paveh
- Bakhsh: Nowsud
- Rural District: Sirvan

Population (2006)
  - Total: 353
- Time zone: UTC+3:30 (IRST)
  - Summer (DST): UTC+4:30 (IRDT)

Shorkan (Persian: شركان, also Romanized as Shorkān; also known as Sharakan, Shāreh Khān, Sharekān, Sheikha, and Shorakā) is a village in Sirvan Rural District, Nowsud District, Paveh County, Kermanshah Province, Iran. At the 2006 census, its population was 353, in 101 families.
