= Mir Abdoli =

Mir Abdoli (Persian: ميرعبدلي) may refer to:

- Mir Abdoli-ye Olya
- Mir Abdoli-ye Sofla
- Mir Abdoli-ye Zarrin Choqa
