= Shahrak-e Serias =

Village in Kermanshah province, Iran

Shahrak-e Serias Persian: شهرك سرياس
- Village
- Location within Iran
- Coordinates: 34°58′41″N 46°25′37″E
- Country: Iran
- Province: Kermanshah
- County: Paveh
- District: Bayangan
- Rural District: Shiveh Sar

Population (2016)
  - Total: 723
- Time zone: UTC+3:30 (IRST)

Shahrak-e Serias (Persian: شهرك سرياس) (Note: Also romanized as Shahrak-e Serīās) is a village in Shiveh Sar Rural District of Bayangan District, Paveh County, Kermanshah province, Iran.

== Demographics ==
=== Population ===
At the time of the 2006 National Census, the village's population was 765 in 176 households, when it was in Mansur-e Aqai Rural District of Shahu District, Ravansar County. The following census in 2011 counted 823 people in 201 households, by which time it had been transferred to Paveh County. The 2016 census measured the population of the village as 723 people in 212 households. It was the most populous village in its rural district.
