= Birvas =

Village in Kermanshah province, Iran

Birvas Persian: بیرواس
- Village
- Location within Iran
- Coordinates: 35°15′54″N 46°08′59″E
- Country: Iran
- Province: Kermanshah
- County: Paveh
- District: Nowsud
- Rural District: Sirvan

Population (2016)
  - Total: 123
- Time zone: UTC+3:30 (IRST)

Birvas (Persian: بیرواس) (Note: Formerly Bidarvaz (بيدرواز); also known as Baharvas, Bervas, Berwas, and Biara) is a village in Sirvan Rural District of Nowsud District, Paveh County, Kermanshah province, Iran.

== Demographics ==
=== Population ===
At the time of the 2006 National Census, the village's population was 52 in 24 households. The following census in 2011 counted 33 people in 16 households. The 2016 census measured the population of the village as 123 people in 42 households.
