= Laran-e Sofla =

Laran-e Sofla لاران سفلي
- Village
- Location within Iran
- Coordinates: 34°56′47″N 46°20′39″E
- Country: Iran
- Province: Kermanshah
- County: Paveh
- Bakhsh: Bayangan
- Rural District: Shiveh Sar

Population (2006)
  - Total: 175
- Time zone: UTC+3:30 (IRST)
  - Summer (DST): UTC+4:30 (IRDT)

Laran-e Sofla (Persian: لاران سفلي, also Romanized as Lārān-e Soflá) is a village in Shiveh Sar Rural District, Bayangan District, Paveh County, Kermanshah Province, Iran. At the 2006 census, its population was 175, in 41 families.
