= Bivand-e Olya =

Bivand-e Olya بيوندعليا
- Village
- Location within Iran
- Coordinates: 34°53′52″N 46°17′41″E
- Country: Iran
- Province: Kermanshah
- County: Javanrud
- Bakhsh: Kalashi
- Rural District: Sharwineh

Population (2006)
  - Total: 224
- Time zone: UTC+3:30 (IRST)
  - Summer (DST): UTC+4:30 (IRDT)

Bivand-e Olya (Persian: بيوندعليا, Sorani Kurdish: بیوەندی ژوورو, also Romanized as Bīvand-e ‘Olyā) is a village in Sharwineh Rural District, Kalashi District, Javanrud County, Kermanshah Province, Iran. At the 2006 census, its population was 224, in 45 families.
