= Mezran =

Village in Kermanshah province, Iran

Mezran Persian: مزران
- Village
- Location within Iran
- Coordinates: 34°57′09″N 46°08′45″E
- Country: Iran
- Province: Kermanshah
- County: Javanrud
- District: Kalashi
- Rural District: Kalashi

Population (2016)
  - Total: 308
- Time zone: UTC+3:30 (IRST)

Mezran (Persian: مزران) (Note: Also romanized as Mazrān; also known as Merzān and Merzarān) is a village in, and the capital of, Kalashi Rural District of Kalashi District, Javanrud County, Kermanshah province, Iran.

== Demographics ==
=== Population ===
At the time of the 2006 National Census, the village's population was 307 in 67 households. The following census in 2011 counted 296 people in 76 households. The 2016 census measured the population of the village as 308 people in 78 households.
