= Hirvi =

Hirvi هیروی
- Village
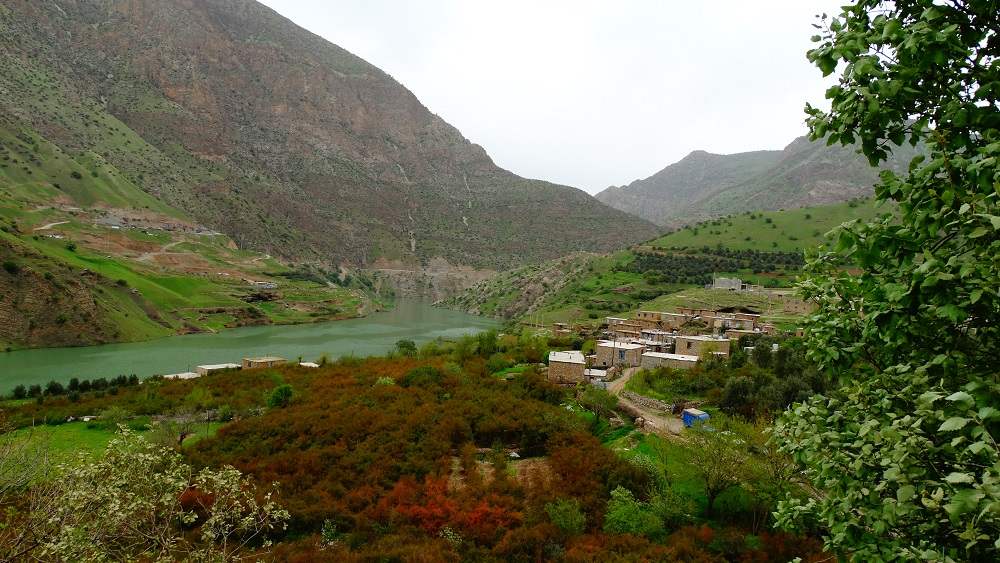

- Location within Iran
- Coordinates: 35°07′07″N 46°14′29″E
- Country: Iran
- Province: Kermanshah
- County: Paveh
- Bakhsh: Central
- Rural District: Howli

Population (2006)
  - Total: 125
- Time zone: UTC+3:30 (IRST)
  - Summer (DST): UTC+4:30 (IRDT)

Hirvi (Persian: هیروی, also Romanized as Hīrvī and Ḩīrvī; also known as Harveh, Harvī, Haweri, Heravī, Hervī, Hīrāvī, and Hirawi) is a village in Howli Rural District, in the Central District of Paveh County, Kermanshah Province, Iran. At the 2006 census, its population was 125, in 33 families.
