= Lashgargah, Kermanshah =

Lashgargah لشگرگاه
- Village
- Location within Iran
- Coordinates: 35°01′14″N 46°08′12″E
- Country: Iran
- Province: Kermanshah
- County: Paveh
- Bakhsh: Bayangan
- Rural District: Makvan

Population (2006)
  - Total: 125
- Time zone: UTC+3:30 (IRST)
  - Summer (DST): UTC+4:30 (IRDT)

Lashgargah (Persian: لشگرگاه, also Romanized as Lashgargāh; also known as Lashkargāh) is a village in Makvan Rural District, Bayangan District, Paveh County, Kermanshah Province, Iran. At the 2006 census, its population was 125, in 29 families.
