= Lashgargah =

Lashgargah (Persian: لشگرگاه) may refer to:

- Lashgargah, Kermanshah
- Lashgargah, Khuzestan

== See also ==
- Lashkar Gah
