= Dudan, Iran =

Village in Kermanshah province, Iran

Dudan Persian: دودان
- Village
- Location within Iran
- Coordinates: 35°00′59″N 46°11′30″E
- Country: Iran
- Province: Kermanshah
- County: Paveh
- District: Bayangan
- Rural District: Makvan

Population (2016)
  - Total: 652
- Time zone: UTC+3:30 (IRST)

Dudan (Persian: دودان) (Note: Also romanized as Dowdān and Dūdān) is a village in, and the capital of, Makvan Rural District of Bayangan District, Paveh County, Kermanshah province, Iran.

== Demographics ==
=== Population ===
At the time of the 2006 National Census, the village's population was 524 in 137 households. The following census in 2011 counted 606 people in 180 households. The 2016 census measured the population of the village as 652 people in 206 households.
