= Aret =

Aret or ARET can refer to:

- Aret, Iran, a village in Kermanshah Province, Iran
- Arethusa (plant), an orchid genus abbreviated Aret.
- Accelerated Reduction/Elimination of Toxics, government program
