= Atashkadeh Mountain =

Mountain in Iran

Atashkadeh رشته‌کوه آتشگاه
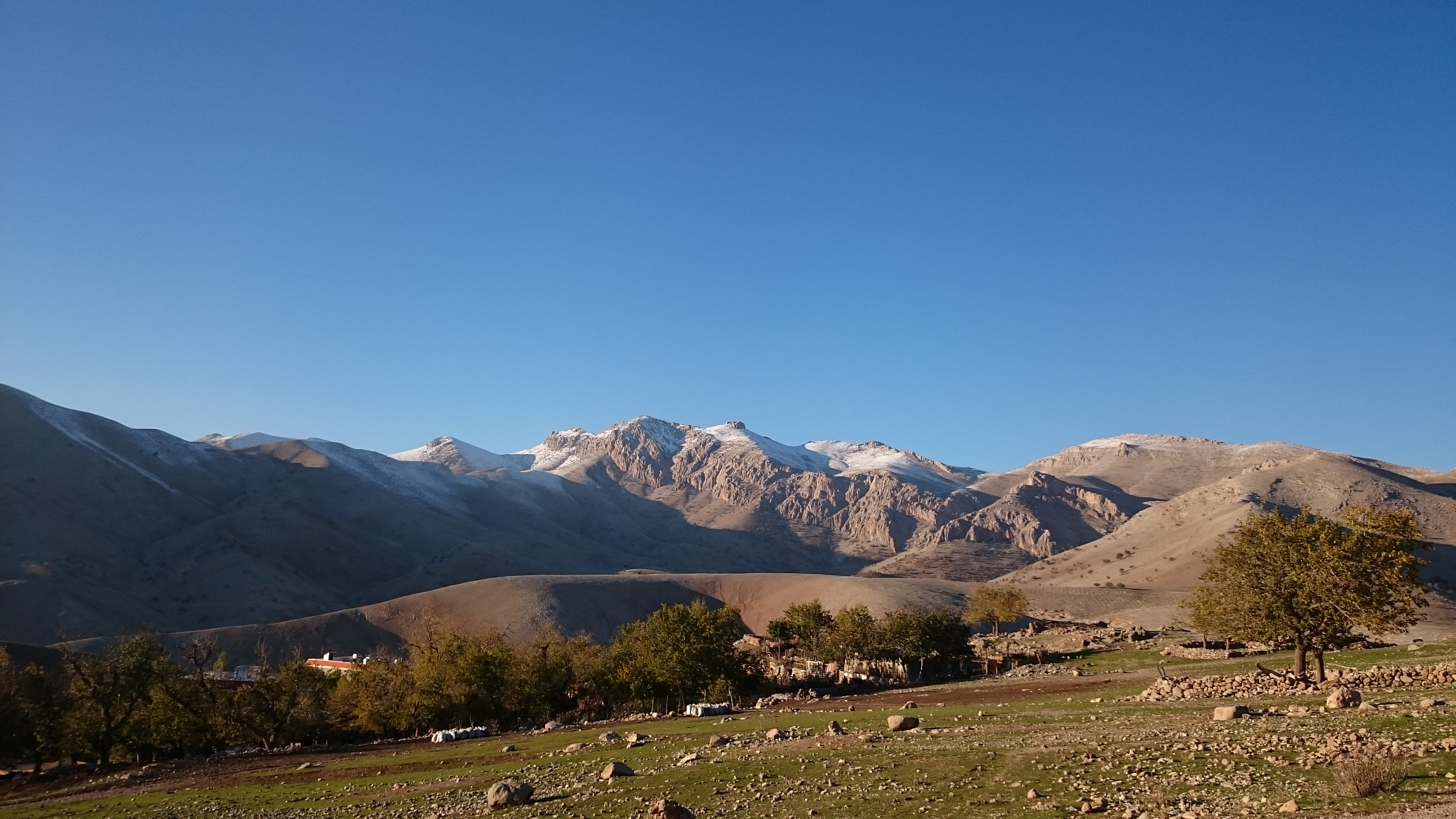

Highest point
- Elevation: 2,485 m (8,153 ft)
- Coordinates: 35°00′15″N 46°21′3″E

Geography
- Location within Iran
- Location: Paveh County, Kermanshah, Iran
- Parent range: Zagros Mountains

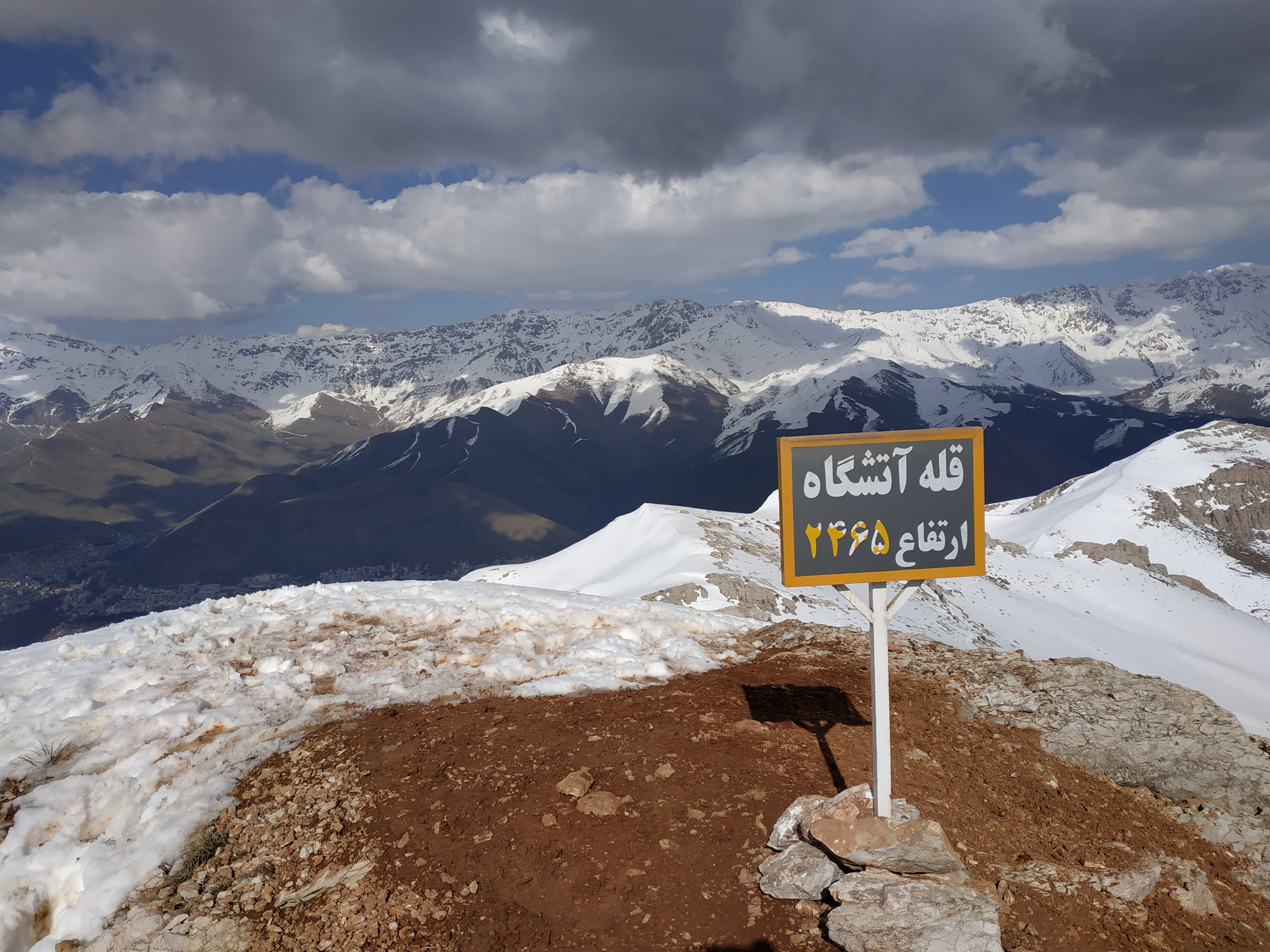

Atashkadeh (Persian: رشته‌کوه آتشگاه) is a mountain located in Paveh County, Kermanshah Province, Iran. Atashkadeh, meaning the firewall (or hatch) is a mountain range isolated from Shahu, including the Zagros Mountains, located south of the city of Paveh and in the village of Khanahaha. This mountain starts from the village of sword and leads to the river Siervan. The peak of the sanctuary, as the highest peak of the southern shaho (2465 m), has views of the wide area near Kermanshah, Ravansar, Vujvanrood, and Salas Babakhani, and the Heldjah and Shahrsar areas of Kurdistan and Marivan. For this reason, at the time of the Zoroastrians, there was a place to light the fire, by which they announced their message of religion. The fire temple of Paveh (fire) lasted for about 750 to 800 years. The fire temple, from ancient times, was the place of pilgrimage and fire of Zoroastrians, and it was burned for 800 years.
