= Laran (disambiguation) =

Laran is the Etruscan god of war.

Laran may also refer to:

- Laran, Hautes-Pyrénées, a town in France
- Laran, Iran, a village in Iran
- Laran-e Olya, a village in Iran
- Laran-e Sofla, a village in Iran
- Laran District, an administrative subdivision of Iran
