= Gol Baghi =

Gol Baghi and Golbaghi (Persian: گل باغي) may refer to:

- Golbaghi, Kermanshah
- Gol Baghi, Lorestan
