= Tin, Iran =

Tin (Persian: طين or تين) in Iran may refer to:

- Tin, Ahar (تين - Tīn), East Azerbaijan Province
- Tin, Khoda Afarin (طين - Ţīn), East Azerbaijan Province
- Tin, Kermanshah (تين - Tīn)
