= Galal, Iran =

Galal or Gelal (Persian: گلال) may refer to any of the following locations in Iran:

- Galal, Ilam
- Gelal, Kermanshah
- Galal, Khuzestan
- Gelal River at Khorramabad
