= Balai (disambiguation) =

The Balai are an Indian caste of weavers.

Balai may also refer to:

- Balai of Qenneshrin, a Syriac saint
- Balai Chand Mukhopadhyay, Indian physician, writer and poet
- Balai Dey, Indian footballer
- Balai Ray, Indian politician
- Balai, Iran, a village in Kermanshah Province
- Balai Pustaka, an Indonesian publishing company

== See also ==
- Bukit Lumut Balai, a stratovolcano on Sumatraisland, Indonesia
- Tanjung Balai (disambiguation)
