= Sorkheban =

Sorkheban or Sorkhban (Persian: سرخ بان) may refer to:

- Sorkheban-e Olya
- Sorkheban-e Sofla
