= Bivand =

Bivand (Persian: بيوند) may refer to:

- Bivand-e Olya
- Bivand-e Sofla
