= Darvaleh-ye Pain =

Darvaleh-ye Pain دوروله پائين
- Village
- Location within Iran
- Coordinates: 35°04′08″N 45°57′07″E
- Country: Iran
- Province: Kermanshah
- County: Javanrud
- Bakhsh: Kalashi
- Rural District: Kalashi

Population (2006)
  - Total: 21
- Time zone: UTC+3:30 (IRST)
  - Summer (DST): UTC+4:30 (IRDT)

Darvaleh-ye Pain (Persian: دوروله پائين, Sorani Kurdish: دەروەلەی خوارو, also Romanized as Darvaleh-ye Pā'īn; also known as Darvaleh-ye Soflá) is a village in Kalashi Rural District, Kalashi District, Javanrud County, Kermanshah Province, Iran. At the 2006 census, its population was 21, in 6 families.
