= Darvaleh =

Darvaleh (Persian: دوروله) may refer to:

- Darvaleh-ye Bala
- Darvaleh-ye Pain
