= Nuel (disambiguation) =

Nuel is a village in Kermanshah Province, Iran.

Nuel may also refer to:

- Jean-Pierre Nuel (1847–1920), Luxembourgian ophthalmologist
  - Nuel's space, part of the inner ear
- Nuel Belnap (1930–2024), American logician
