= Sharvineh =

City in Kermanshah province, Iran

Sharvineh Persian: شروينه
- City
- Location within Iran
- Coordinates: 34°49′40″N 46°21′30″E
- Country: Iran
- Province: Kermanshah
- County: Javanrud
- District: Kalashi

Population (2016)
  - Total: 599
- Time zone: UTC+3:30 (IRST)

Sharvineh (Persian: شروينه) (Note: Also romanized as Sharvīneh and Shervīneh; also known as Shervenīneh) is a city in, and the capital of, Kalashi District of Javanrud County, Kermanshah province, Iran. It also serves as the administrative center for Sharvineh Rural District.

== Demographics ==
=== Population ===
At the time of the 2006 National Census, Sharvineh's population was 648 in 144 households, when it was a village in Sharvineh Rural District. The following census in 2011 counted 686 people in 159 households. The 2016 census measured the population of the village as 599 people in 172 households. It was the most populous village in its rural district.

After the census, the village of Sharvineh was elevated to the status of a city.
