= Sharakan =

Sharakan may refer to:

- Armenian chant (Armenian: շարական, pronounced sharakan)
- Sharakan, alternative name of Shorkan, a village in Iran
