= Lulom =

Lulom or Lulem (Persian: لولم) may refer to:

- Lulom, Golestan
- Lulem, Kermanshah
