= Kolur, Iran =

Kolur or Kolowr or Kolvar (Persian: كلور) in Iran may refer to:

- Kolowr, a city in Ardabil Province
- Kolur, Ardabil, a village in Ardabil Province
- Kolvar, Ardabil, a village in Ardabil Province
- Kolur, Kermanshah, a village in Kermanshah Province

== See also ==
- Kalvar, Iran (disambiguation)
