= Sefid Ab =

Sefid Ab or Safid Ab (Persian: سفيداب) may refer to:

- Sefid-Ab, an archaeological site in Iran
- Sefid Ab, Kermanshah, a village in Iran
- Sefid Ab, Lorestan, a village in Iran
- Sefid Ab, Markazi, a village in Iran
- Sefid Ab, Mazandaran, a village in Iran
- Sefid Ab, Qazvin, a village in Iran
