= Hervi =

Hervi (Persian: هروي) in Iran may refer to:

- Hervi, East Azerbaijan
- Hervi, Kermanshah
