= Gunab =

Gunab (Persian: گوناب) may refer to:

- Gunab, Kermanshah
- Gunab, Markazi
- Gunab (word), a classical Persian word meaning blush or rouge
