= Tashar =

Tashar may refer to:

- Tashar, Kermanshah (تشار - Tashār) in Iran
- Tashar, Ukhrul, a village in Manipur, India
- State of Tashar a micronation based in Algeria
