= Narvi =

Narvi may refer to:

- Narfi, a character from Norse mythology (also called Narvi)
- Narvi (island), in the Gulf of Finland
- Narvi (moon), a moon of Saturn
- Narvi, Iran, a village in Kermanshah Province, Iran
