= Kalvar, Iran =

Kalvar or Kaluvar (Persian: كلوار) may refer to:

- Kalvar, Ardabil
- Kaluvar, Kohgiluyeh and Boyer-Ahmad

== See also ==
- Kolvar (disambiguation)
