= Dudan =

Dudan may refer to:

- Dudan, Iran, village
- Alessandro Dudan, Dalmatian Italian irredentist
- Pierre Dudan, writer of Softly, Softly (song)

== See also ==
- Dudani
