= Nowdeshah =

City in Kermanshah province, Iran

Nowdeshah Persian: نودشه
- City
- Location within Iran
- Coordinates: 35°10′49″N 46°15′15″E
- Country: Iran
- Province: Kermanshah
- County: Paveh
- District: Nowsud

Population (2016)
  - Total: 3,683
- Time zone: UTC+3:30 (IRST)

Nowdeshah (Persian: نودشه) (Note: Also romanized as Naudsheh, Now Dasheh, Nowdesheh, and Nūdsheh; also known as Naudesh and Nowcheh; (Kurdish: نۆتشه)) is a city in Nowsud District of Paveh County, Kermanshah province, Iran. The city is famous for kllash, a type of footwear made with natural fabrics, such as cow skin, cotton, etc.

== Demographics ==
=== Population ===
At the time of the 2006 National Census, the city's population was 3,548 in 968 households. The following census in 2011 counted 3,077 people in 936 households. The 2016 census measured the population of the city as 3,683 people in 1,229 households. Recent estimated population is about 5,000 permanent inhabitants. During holy days specially Nowruz, the city is full of tourists.
