= Nowsud =

City in Kermanshah province, Iran

Nowsud Persian: نوسود
- City
- Location within Iran
- Coordinates: 35°09′38″N 46°12′14″E
- Country: Iran
- Province: Kermanshah
- County: Paveh
- District: Nowsud

Population (2016)
  - Total: 1,949
- Time zone: UTC+3:30 (IRST)

Nowsud (Persian: نوسود) (Note: Also romanized as Nawsūd and Nowsūd) is a city in, and the capital of, Nowsud District of Paveh County, Kermanshah province, Iran.

== Demographics ==
=== Population ===
At the time of the 2006 National Census, the city's population was 1,562 in 438 households. The following census in 2011 counted 1,730 people in 550 households. The 2016 census measured the population of the city as 1,949 people in 629 households. Its inhabitants are predominantly Kurds.
