= Bayangan =

City in Kermanshah province, Iran

Bayangan Persian: باينگان
- City
- Location within Iran
- Coordinates: 34°58′51″N 46°16′17″E
- Country: Iran
- Province: Kermanshah
- County: Paveh
- District: Bayangan

Population (2016)
  - Total: 1,513
- Time zone: UTC+3:30 (IRST)

Bayangan (Persian: باينگان) (Note: Also romanized as Bāyangān and Bāyengān) is a city and capital of, Bayangan District of Paveh County, Kermanshah province, Iran.

== Demographics ==
=== Population ===
At the time of the 2006 National Census, the city's population was 1,634 in 431 households. The following census in 2011 counted 1,731 people in 452 households. The 2016 census measured the population of the city as 1,513 people in 457 households.
