= Bonduiyeh =

Bonduiyeh بندوئيه
- Village
- Location within Iran
- Coordinates: 29°31′05″N 52°10′26″E
- Country: Iran
- Province: Fars
- County: Shiraz
- Bakhsh: Arzhan
- Rural District: Kuh Mareh Sorkhi

Population (2006)
  - Total: 250
- Time zone: UTC+3:30 (IRST)
  - Summer (DST): UTC+4:30 (IRDT)

Bonduiyeh (Persian: بندوئيه, also Romanized as Bondū’īyeh and Bondūyeh; also known as Bondāreh) is a village in Kuh Mareh Sorkhi Rural District, Arzhan District, Shiraz County, Fars province, Iran. At the 2006 census, its population was 250, in 59 families.
