= Guyileh, Khuzestan =

Coordinates: 31.7068°N 50.1453°E

Guyileh گويله
- Village
- Interactive map of Guyileh
- Country: Iran
- Province: Khuzestan
- County: Izeh
- Bakhsh: Dehdez
- Rural District: Donbaleh Rud-e Shomali

Population (2006)
  - Total: 85
- Time zone: UTC+3:30 (IRST)
  - Summer (DST): UTC+4:30 (IRDT)

Guyileh (Persian: گويله, also Romanized as Gūyīleh) is a village in Donbaleh Rud-e Shomali Rural District, Dehdez District, Izeh County, Khuzestan Province, Iran. At the 2006 census, its population was 85, in 20 families.
