= Gol Baghi, Lorestan =

Gol Baghi گلباغی
- Village
- Location within Iran
- Coordinates: 33°59′42″N 47°53′44″E
- Country: Iran
- Province: Lorestan
- County: Delfan
- Bakhsh: Central
- Rural District: Nurabad

Population (2006)
  - Total: 256
- Time zone: UTC+3:30 (IRST)
  - Summer (DST): UTC+4:30 (IRDT)

Gol Baghi (Persian: گلباغی, also Romanized as Gol Bāghī, Golbāghī, Golbākhī, and Gulbākhi) is a village in Nurabad Rural District, in the Central District of Delfan County, Lorestan Province, Iran. At the 2006 census, its population was 256, in 52 families.
