= Accelerated Reduction/Elimination of Toxics =

Former Canadian environmental program

The Accelerated Reduction/Elimination of Toxics (ARET) program was a Canadian program established in the early 1990s with the goal of using voluntary measures to reduce or eliminate harmful substances.

== Formation ==
The program was started by the New Directions Group (NDG), a group of senior industry representatives and Environmental Non-Government Organizations (ENGOs). After Environment Canada formally supported the initiative in 1991, the ARET Stakeholder committee was formed to participate in the program. The committee consisted of representatives from industry, provincial and federal governments, health and environmental groups, and labour organizations.

The committee first evaluated a list of over 2,000 chemicals, scoring them on the basis of toxicity, persistence, and bioaccumulation capability. By 1994, the evaluation was complete and a resulting list of 117 toxic substances were slated by the committee for voluntary elimination or reduction by the year 2000.

== Goals ==
=== Short-term goals ===
- Reduce persistent, bioaccumulative and toxic substance emissions by 90 percent
- Reduce all other toxic substance emissions by 50 percent

=== Long-term goals ===
- Virtual elimination of releases of 30 persistent, bioaccumulative and toxic substances
- Reduction of another 87 toxic substances to levels insufficient to cause harm

== Results ==
The success of the ARET program is disputed. While Environment Canada states that over 70,000 tonnes of toxic substances were prevented from release because of the success of the program, the multi-stakeholder nature of the committee lead to disagreements over which substances would be given priority. Environmental and labour groups withdrew from the committee over the emphasis placed on reductions, rather than eliminations, of these substances by industry representatives. Nils Axel Braathen also claims that knowing to what extent the reductions were actual improvements from the "business-as-usual" reduction scenario is very difficult, meaning that the net environmental benefits were questionable.

== See also ==
- Environment Canada
