= Lashgargah, Khuzestan =

Lashgargah لشگرگاه
- Village
- Location within Iran
- Coordinates: 31°58′12″N 49°35′59″E
- Country: Iran
- Province: Khuzestan
- County: Izeh
- Bakhsh: Central
- Rural District: Margha

Population (2006)
  - Total: 287
- Time zone: UTC+3:30 (IRST)
  - Summer (DST): UTC+4:30 (IRDT)

Lashgargah (Persian: لشگرگاه, also Romanized as Lashgargāh) is a village in Margha Rural District, in the Central District of Izeh County, Khuzestan Province, Iran. At the 2006 census, its population was 287, in 46 families.
