= Banehvreh =

City in Kermanshah province, Iran

Banehvreh Persian: بانه‌وره
- City
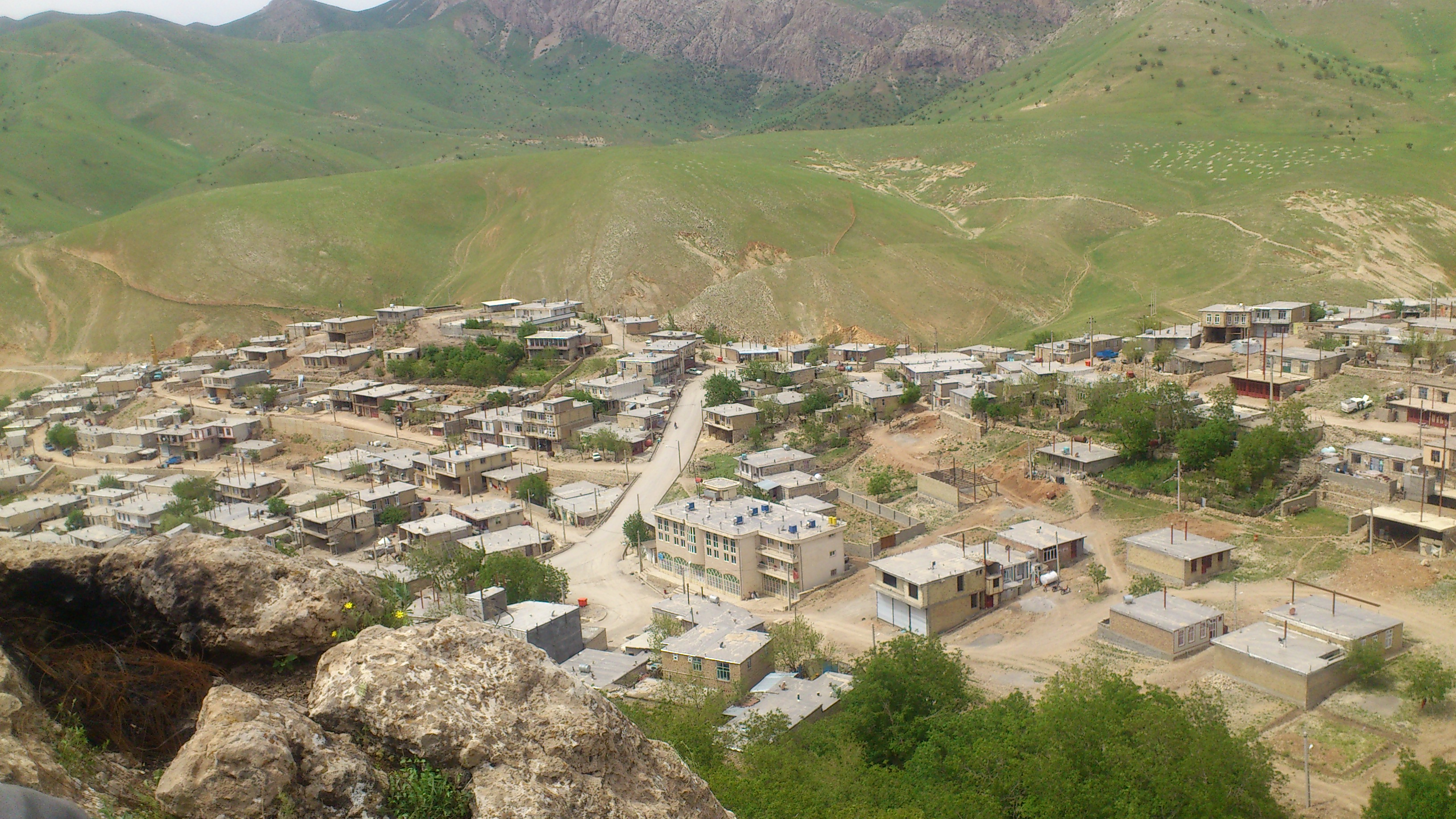
- The city of Banehvreh

- Location within Iran
- Coordinates: 34°58′14″N 46°21′36″E
- Country: Iran
- Province: Kermanshah
- County: Paveh
- District: Bayangan

Population (2016)
  - Total: 3,187
- Time zone: UTC+3:30 (IRST)

Banehvreh (Persian: بانه‌وره) (Note: Also known as Bāneh Verdeh, Banevreh, Banureh and Bānūreh; (Sorani Kurdish: بانه‌ورێ)) is a city in Bayangan District of Paveh County, Kermanshah province, Iran, serving as the administrative center for Shiveh Sar Rural District.

== Demographics ==
=== Population ===
At the time of the 2006 National Census, Banehvreh's population was 3,139 in 689 households, when it was a village in Shiveh Sar Rural District. The following census in 2011 counted 3,043 people in 756 households. The 2016 census measured the population as 3,187 people in 891 households, by which time the village had been elevated to the status of a city.
