= Gavileh, Kurdistan =

Gavileh گويله
- Village
- Location within Iran
- Coordinates: 35°41′06″N 46°19′43″E
- Country: Iran
- Province: Kurdistan
- County: Marivan
- Bakhsh: Sarshiv
- Rural District: Sarshiv

Population (2006)
  - Total: 218
- Time zone: UTC+3:30 (IRST)
  - Summer (DST): UTC+4:30 (IRDT)

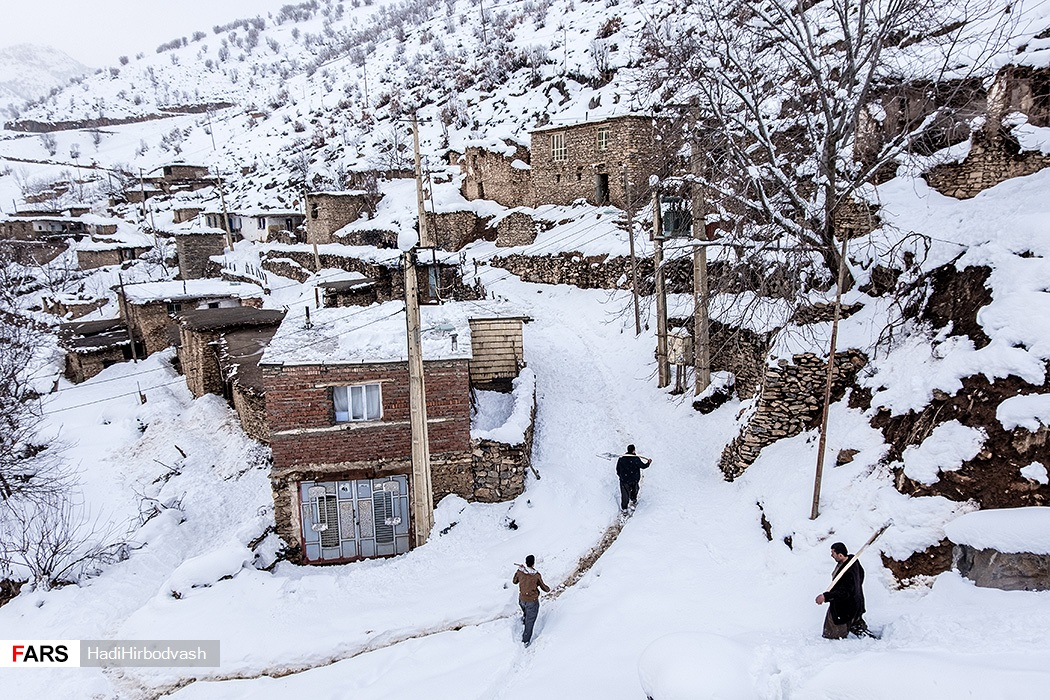

Gavileh (Persian: گويله, also Romanized as Gavīleh and Govīleh) is a village in Sarshiv Rural District, Sarshiv District, Marivan County, Kurdistan Province, Iran. At the 2006 census, its population was 218, in 41 families. The village is populated by Kurds.
