= Tanjungbalai =

Tanjung Balai or Tanjungbalai (often abbreviated Tg. Balai) may refer to:

- Tanjungbalai (city), the independent city which split off from Asahan Regency of North Sumatra, formerly the main part of Tanjung Balai, Asahan
- Tanjung Balai, Asahan, the remaining part left over after the city incorporation, still part of Asahan Regency
- The port of Tanjung Balai on the Asahan River which lies in Asahan Regency but not in the city
- Tanjung Balai Karimun, a port and town of Great Karimun island in Riau Islands province
