= Makvan Rural District =

Rural district in Kermanshah province, Iran

Makvan Rural District Persian: دهستان ماكوان
- Rural District
- Location within Iran
- Coordinates: 35°01′20″N 46°08′04″E
- Country: Iran
- Province: Kermanshah
- County: Paveh
- District: Bayangan
- Capital: Dudan

Population (2016)
  - Total: 2,149
- Time zone: UTC+3:30 (IRST)

Makvan Rural District (Persian: دهستان ماكوان) is in Bayangan District of Paveh County, Kermanshah province, Iran. Its capital is the village of Dudan.

== Demographics ==
=== Population ===
At the time of the 2006 National Census, the rural district's population was 2,327 in 570 households. There were 2,255 inhabitants in 615 households at the following census of 2011. The 2016 census measured the population of the rural district as 2,149 in 633 households. The most populous of its 33 villages was Zardui, with 743 people.
