= Shamshir Rural District =

Rural district in Kermanshah province, Iran

Shamshir Rural District Persian: دهستان شمشير
- Rural District
- Location within Iran
- Coordinates: 35°00′52″N 46°26′24″E
- Country: Iran
- Province: Kermanshah
- County: Paveh
- District: Central
- Capital: Shamshir

Population (2016)
  - Total: 10,234
- Time zone: UTC+3:30 (IRST)

Shamshir Rural District (Persian: دهستان شمشير) is in the Central District of Paveh County, Kermanshah province, Iran. Its capital is the village of Shamshir. The previous capital of the rural district was the village of Churizhi, now a neighborhood in the city of Paveh with a population of 3,500 people.

== Demographics ==
=== Population ===
At the time of the 2006 National Census, the rural district's population was 8,680 in 2,138 households. There were 9,167 inhabitants in 2,593 households at the following census of 2011. The 2016 census measured the population of the rural district as 10,234 in 3,044 households. The most populous of its eight villages was Durisan (now a neighborhood in the city of Paveh),
