= Sirvan Rural District =

Rural district in Kermanshah province, Iran

Sirvan Rural District Persian: دهستان سيروان
- Rural District
- Location within Iran
- Coordinates: 35°11′51″N 46°13′44″E
- Country: Iran
- Province: Kermanshah
- County: Paveh
- District: Nowsud
- Capital: Neyesaneh

Population (2016)
  - Total: 3,118
- Time zone: UTC+3:30 (IRST)

Sirvan Rural District (Persian: دهستان سيروان) is in Nowsud District of Paveh County, Kermanshah province, Iran. Its capital is the village of Neyesaneh.

== Demographics ==
=== Population ===
At the time of the 2006 National Census, the rural district's population was 2,874 in 833 households. There were 2,855 inhabitants in 887 households at the following census of 2011. The 2016 census measured the population of the rural district as 3,118 in 1,034 households. The most populous of its 28 villages was Hani Garmaleh, with 869 people.

== See also ==
Birvas, (Note: Formerly Bidarvaz) a village in this rural district
