= Howli Rural District =

Rural district in Kermanshah province, Iran

Howli Rural District Persian: دهستان هولي
- Rural District
- Location within Iran
- Coordinates: 35°05′11″N 46°19′42″E
- Country: Iran
- Province: Kermanshah
- County: Paveh
- District: Central
- Capital: Khaneqah

Population (2016)
  - Total: 6,173
- Time zone: UTC+3:30 (IRST)

Howli Rural District (Persian: دهستان هولي) is in the Central District of Paveh County, Kermanshah province, Iran. Its capital is the village of Khaneqah.

== Demographics ==
=== Population ===
At the time of the 2006 National Census, the rural district's population was 6,330 in 1,627 households. There were 6,508 inhabitants in 1,747 households at the following census of 2011. The 2016 census measured the population of the rural district as 6,173 in 1,862 households. The most populous of its 14 villages was Desheh, with 1,549 people.
