= Shiveh Sar Rural District =

Rural district in Kermanshah province, Iran

Shiveh Sar Rural District Persian: دهستان شيوه سر
- Rural District
- Location within Iran
- Coordinates: 34°57′22″N 46°21′45″E
- Country: Iran
- Province: Kermanshah
- County: Paveh
- District: Bayangan
- Capital: Banehvreh

Population (2016)
  - Total: 2,654
- Time zone: UTC+3:30 (IRST)

Shiveh Sar Rural District (Persian: دهستان شيوه سر) is in Bayangan District of Paveh County, Kermanshah province, Iran. It is administered from the city of Banehvreh.

== Demographics ==
=== Population ===
At the time of the 2006 National Census, the rural district's population was 5,026 in 1,133 households. There were 5,810 inhabitants in 1,455 households at the following census of 2011. The 2016 census measured the population of the rural district as 2,654 in 760 households. The most populous of its 12 villages was Shahrak-e Serias, with 723 people.
