= Nowsud District =

District in Kermanshah province, Iran

Nowsud District Persian: بخش نوسود
- District
- Location within Iran
- Coordinates: 35°11′51″N 46°13′44″E
- Country: Iran
- Province: Kermanshah
- County: Paveh
- Capital: Nowsud

Population (2016)
  - Total: 8,750
- Time zone: UTC+3:30 (IRST)

Nowsud District (Persian: بخش نوسود) is in Paveh County, Kermanshah province, Iran. Its capital is the city of Nowsud.

== Demographics ==
=== Population ===
At the time of the 2006 National Census, the district's population was 7,984 in 2,239 households. The following census in 2011 counted 7,662 people in 2,373 households. The 2016 census measured the population of the district as 8,750 inhabitants in 2,892 households.

=== Administrative divisions ===
Nowsud District Population
Administrative Divisions	2006	2011	2016
Sirvan Rural District	2,874	2,855	3,118
Nowdeshah (city)	3,548	3,077	3,683
Nowsud (city)	1,562	1,730	1,949
Total	7,984	7,662	8,750
RD = Rural District
