= Bayangan District =

District in Kermanshah province, Iran

Bayangan District Persian: بخش باینگان
- District
- Location within Iran
- Coordinates: 35°00′14″N 46°12′05″E
- Country: Iran
- Province: Kermanshah
- County: Paveh
- Capital: Bayangan

Population (2016)
  - Total: 9,503
- Time zone: UTC+3:30 (IRST)

Bayangan District (Persian: بخش باینگان) is in Paveh County, Kermanshah province, Iran. Its capital is the city of Bayangan.

== History ==
After the 2011 National Census, the village of Banehvreh was elevated to the status of a city.

== Demographics ==
=== Population ===
At the time of the 2006 census, the district's population was 8,987 in 2,134 households. The following census in 2011 counted 9,796 people in 2,522 households. The 2016 census measured the population of the district as 9,503 inhabitants in 2,741 households.

=== Administrative divisions ===
Bayangan District Population
Administrative Divisions	2006	2011	2016
Makvan Rural District	2,327	2,255	2,149
Shiveh Sar Rural District	5,026	5,810	2,654
Banehvreh (city)			3,187
Bayangan (city)	1,634	1,731	1,513
Total	8,987	9,796	9,503
RD = Rural District
