= Central District (Paveh County) =

District in Kermanshah province, Iran

Central District (Paveh County) Persian: بخش مرکزی شهرستان پاوه
- District
- Location within Iran
- Coordinates: 35°04′20″N 46°21′15″E
- Country: Iran
- Province: Kermanshah
- County: Paveh
- Capital: Paveh

Population (2016)
  - Total: 42,178
- Time zone: UTC+3:30 (IRST)

The Central District of Paveh County (Persian: بخش مرکزی شهرستان پاوه) is in Kermanshah province, Iran. Its capital is the city of Paveh.

== Demographics ==
=== Population ===
At the time of the 2006 National Census, the district's population was 34,784 in 8,936 households. The following census in 2011 counted 39,379 people in 11,063 households. The 2016 census measured the population of the district as 42,178 inhabitants in 12,838 households.

=== Administrative divisions ===
Central District (Paveh County) Population
| Administrative Divisions | 2006 | 2011 | 2016 |
|---|---|---|---|
| Howli RD | 6,330 | 6,508 | 6,173 |
| Shamshir RD | 8,680 | 9,167 | 10,234 |
| Paveh (city) | 19,774 | 23,704 | 25,771 |
| Total | 34,784 | 39,379 | 42,178 |
RD = Rural District
