= Kalashi Rural District =

Rural district in Kermanshah province, Iran

Kalashi Rural District Persian: دهستان كلاشي
- Rural District
- Location within Iran
- Coordinates: 34°59′04″N 46°05′48″E
- Country: Iran
- Province: Kermanshah
- County: Javanrud
- District: Kalashi
- Capital: Mezran

Population (2016)
  - Total: 4,447
- Time zone: UTC+3:30 (IRST)

Kalashi Rural District (Persian: دهستان كلاشي) is in Kalashi District of Javanrud County, Kermanshah province, Iran. Its capital is the village of Mezran.

== Demographics ==
=== Population ===
At the time of the 2006 National Census, the rural district's population was 4,392 in 874 households. There were 4,303 inhabitants in 977 households at the following census of 2011. The 2016 census measured the population of the rural district as 4,447 in 1,126 households. The most populous of its 33 villages was Bani Lavan, with 906 people.
