= Sharvineh Rural District =

Rural district in Kermanshah province, Iran

Sharvineh Rural District Persian: دهستان شروينه
- Rural District
- Location within Iran
- Coordinates: 34°51′38″N 46°19′09″E
- Country: Iran
- Province: Kermanshah
- County: Javanrud
- District: Kalashi
- Capital: Sharvineh

Population (2016)
  - Total: 4,229
- Time zone: UTC+3:30 (IRST)

Sharvineh Rural District (Persian: دهستان شروينه) is in Kalashi District of Javanrud County, Kermanshah province, Iran. It is administered from the city of Sharvineh.

== Demographics ==
=== Population ===
At the time of the 2006 National Census, the rural district's population was 4,819 in 1,053 households. There were 4,677 inhabitants in 1,119 households at the following census of 2011. The 2016 census measured the population of the rural district as 4,229 in 1,128 households. The most populous of its 28 villages was Sharvineh (now a city), with 599 people.
