= Javanrud County =

County in Kermanshah province, Iran

Javanrud County Persian: شهرستان جوانرود
- County
- Location of Javanrud County in Kermanshah province (top left, yellow)

- Location of Kermanshah province in Iran
- Coordinates: 34°53′N 46°15′E
- Country: Iran
- Province: Kermanshah
- Capital: Javanrud
- Districts: Central, Kalashi

Population (2016)
  - Total: 75,169
- Time zone: UTC+3:30 (IRST)

Javanrud County (Persian: شهرستان جوانرود) is in Kermanshah province, Iran, part of what is unofficially referred to as Iranian Kurdistan. Its capital is the city of Javanrud.

== History ==
After the 2016 National Census, the village of Sharvineh was elevated to the status of a city.

== Demographics ==
=== Population ===
At the time of the 2006 census, the county's population was 62,259 in 13,629 households. The following census in 2011 counted 71,235 people in 17,854 households. The 2016 census measured the population of the county as 75,169 in 20,592 households.

=== Administrative divisions ===
Javanrud County's population history and administrative structure over three consecutive censuses are shown in the following table.

Javanrud County Population
Administrative Divisions	2006	2011	2016
Central District	53,048	62,255	66,493
Bazan RD	5,257	4,836	4,647
Palanganeh RD	4,687	5,936	7,492
Javanrud (city)	43,104	51,483	54,354
Kalashi District	9,211	8,980	8,676
Kalashi RD	4,392	4,303	4,447
Sharvineh RD	4,819	4,677	4,229
Sharvineh (city) (Note: Became a city after the 2016 census)			
Total	62,259	71,235	75,169
RD = Rural District

== Geography ==
The county is bounded in the north and west by Paveh County and Kurdistan province, in the southeast by Ravansar County, and in the southwest by Sarpol-e Zahab County.

== See also ==
Media related to Javanrud County at Wikimedia Commons
