= Kalashi District =

District in Kermanshah province, Iran

Kalashi District Persian: بخش کلاشی
- District
- Location within Iran
- Coordinates: 34°56′30″N 46°10′16″E
- Country: Iran
- Province: Kermanshah
- County: Javanrud
- Capital: Sharvineh

Population (2016)
  - Total: 8,676
- Time zone: UTC+3:30 (IRST)

Kalashi District (Persian: بخش کلاشی) is in Javanrud County, Kermanshah province, Iran. Its capital is the city of Sharvineh.

== History ==
After the 2016 National Census, the village of Sharvineh was elevated to the status of a city.

== Demographics ==
=== Population ===
At the time of the 2006 census, the district's population was 9,211 in 1,927 households. The following census in 2011 counted 8,980 people in 2,096 households. The 2016 census measured the population of the district as 8,676 inhabitants in 2,254 households.

=== Administrative divisions ===
Kalashi District Population
Administrative Divisions	2006	2011	2016
Kalashi RD	4,392	4,303	4,447
Sharvineh RD	4,819	4,677	4,229
Sharvineh (city) (Note: Became a city after the 2016 census)			
Total	9,211	8,980	8,676
RD = Rural District
