= Paveh County =

County in Kermanshah province, Iran

Paveh County Persian: شهرستان پاوه
- County
- Location of Paveh County in Kermanshah province (top, pink)

- Location of Kermanshah province in Iran
- Coordinates: 35°05′N 46°16′E
- Country: Iran
- Province: Kermanshah
- Capital: Paveh
- Districts: Central, Bayangan, Nowsud

Population (2016)
  - Total: 60,431
- Time zone: UTC+3:30 (IRST)

Paveh County (Persian: شهرستان پاوه) is in Kermanshah province, Iran. Its capital is the city of Paveh.

== History ==
After the 2011 National Census, the village of Banehvreh was elevated to the status of a city.

== Demographics ==
=== Population ===
At the time of the 2006 census, the county's population was 51,755 in 13,309 households. The following census in 2011 counted 56,837 people in 15,929 households. The 2016 census measured the population of the county as 60,431 in 18,471 households.

=== Administrative divisions ===
Paveh County's population history and administrative structure over three consecutive censuses are shown in the following table.

Paveh County Population
Administrative Divisions	2006	2011	2016
Central District	34,784	39,379	42,178
Howli RD	6,330	6,508	6,173
Shamshir RD	8,680	9,167	10,234
Paveh (city)	19,774	23,704	25,771
Bayangan District	8,987	9,796	9,503
Makvan RD	2,327	2,255	2,149
Shiveh Sar RD	5,026	5,810	2,654
Banehvreh (city)			3,187
Bayangan (city)	1,634	1,731	1,513
Nowsud District	7,984	7,662	8,750
Sirvan RD	2,874	2,855	3,118
Nowdeshah (city)	3,548	3,077	3,683
Nowsud (city)	1,562	1,730	1,949
Total	51,755	56,837	60,431
RD = Rural District

== See also ==
Media related to Paveh County at Wikimedia Commons
