= Kermanshah province =

Province of Iran

Kermanshah province پارێزگای کرماشان (Kurdish)
- Province
- استان کرمانشاه (Persian)
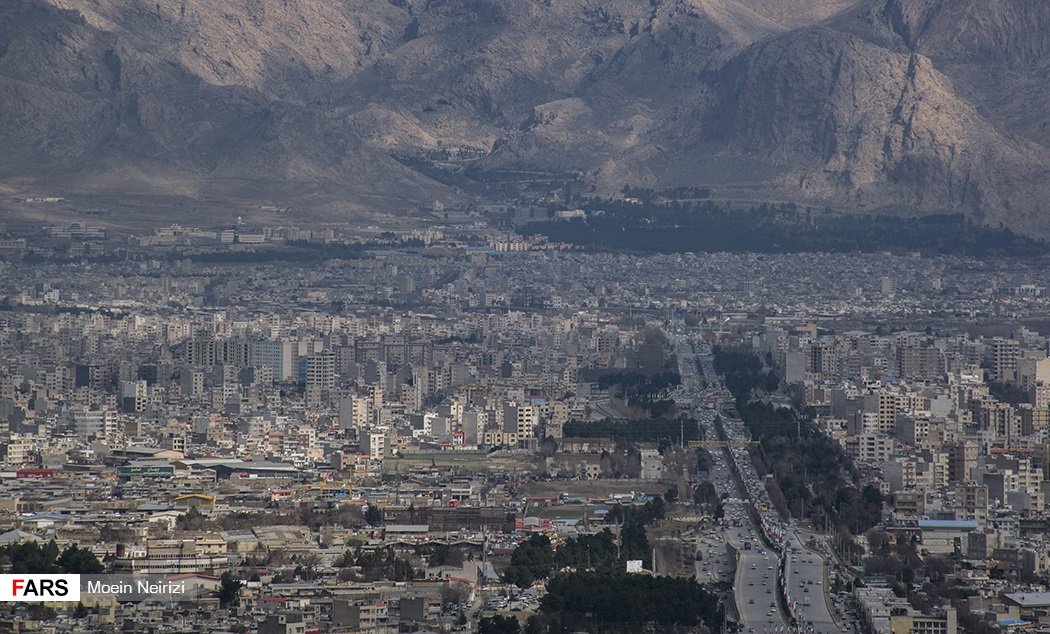
- City of Kermanshah, Central District, Kermanshah County.

- Location of Kermanshah province within Iran
- Coordinates: 34°33′N 46°43′E
- Country: Iran
- Region: 4th Region
- Capital: Kermanshah
- Counties: 14

Government
  - Governor-general: Manouchehr Habibi (Independent)

Area
  - Total: 24,998 km^{2} (9,652 sq mi)

Population (2016)
  - Total: 1,952,434
  - Density: 78.104/km^{2} (202.29/sq mi)
- Demonym: Kermanshahi
- Time zone: UTC+03:30 (IRST)
- ISO 3166 code: IR-05
- Main language(s): Kurdish local Persian official
- HDI (2017): 0.796 high · 14th

Kermanshah province (Persian: استان كرمانشاه) (Note: Also romanized as Ostân-e Kermânšâh; Kurdish: پارێزگای کرماشان, romanized as Parêzgeha Kirmaşan; known from 1969 to 1986 as Kermanshahan, and from 1986 to 1995 as Bakhtaran (استان باختران)) is one of the 31 provinces of Iran, bordering Iraq. Its capital is the city of Kermanshah. It forms part of the area unofficially known as Iranian Kurdistan.

According to a 2014 segmentation by the Ministry of Interior, it is the center of Region 4, with the region's central secretariat located in Kermanshah.

A majority of people in the province are Shia, and there are Sunni and Yarsani minority groups.

== History ==
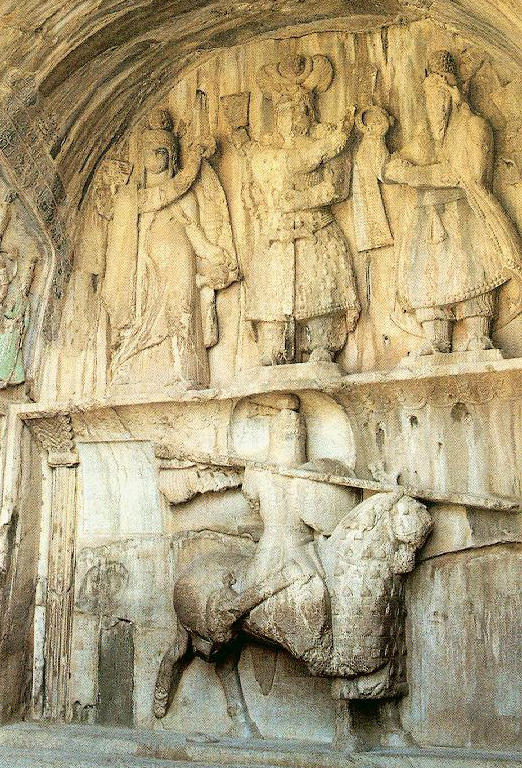
At the top panel Khosrow II is believed to be standing here in this relief at Taq-e Bostan. On his left is Ahura Mazda, on his right is Anahita, and below him is a mounted Persian knight.

The province has a rich Paleolithic heritage. Many caves with Paleolithic remains have been surveyed or excavated there. some of these cave sites are located in Bisetun and north of Kermanshah. The first known physical remains of Neanderthal man in Iran was discovered in Bisitun Cave. Do-Ashkaft Cave, Kobeh, Warwasi, and Mar Tarik are some of the Middle Paleolithic sites in the region. Kermanshah also has many Neolithic sites, of which the most well-known are Ganj Dareh, Sarab, and Asiab. At Ganj Dareh, the earliest evidence for goat domestication have been documented.

In May 2009, based on a research conducted by the University of Hamedan and UCL, the head of Archeology Research Center of Iran's Cultural Heritage and Tourism Organization announced that the oldest prehistoric village in the Middle East dating back to 9800 B.C., was discovered in Sahneh, located in west of Kermanshah.

The monuments found in Kermanshah show two glorious periods, the Achaemenid and Sassanid eras. The mythical ruler of the Pishdadian is described as founding the city while Tahmores Divband built it. An alternative narrative is that the construction was by Bahram IV of the Sassanid dynasty during the 4th century CE. Kermanshah reached a peak during the reign of Hormizd IV and Khosrau I of Sassanids, before being demoted to a secondary royal residence.

The city suffered major damage during the Arab invasions but recovered in the Safavid period to make great progress. Concurrent with the Afghan attack and the fall of Isfahan, Kermanshah was almost completely destroyed by the Ottoman invasion.

During the Iran–Iraq War the province suffered heavy fighting. Most towns and cities were badly damaged and some like Sar-e Pol-e Zahab and Qhasr-e-Shirin were almost completely destroyed.

The November 2017 Iran–Iraq earthquake killed more than 600 people.

On 28 December 2017, Kermanshah became one of several Iranian provinces to break out into protests. The Supreme Leader of Iran has blamed western interference. Some female organizations such as The National Council of Resistance of Iran (NCRI) have taken partial credit for the organization of these protests.

== Demographics ==
Kermanshah province historical population
Year	Pop.	±%
1996	1,778,596	—
2006	1,879,385	+5.7%
2011	1,945,227	+3.5%
2016	1,952,434	+0.4%
amar.org.ir

=== Population ===
At the time of the 2006 national census, the province's population was 1,842,457 in 444,185 households.

By the time of the following census in 2011, there were 1,945,227 people in 530,911 households.

The 2016 census measured the population of the province as 1,952,434 in 576,861 households.

=== Administrative divisions ===

The population history and structural changes of Kermanshah province's administrative divisions over three consecutive censuses are shown in the following table.

Kermanshah province
Counties	2006	2011	2016
Dalahu	42,310	39,837	35,987
Gilan-e Gharb	60,671	62,858	57,007
Harsin	90,452	86,342	78,350
Javanrud	62,259	71,235	75,169
Kangavar	80,215	81,051	76,216
Kermanshah	950,400	1,030,978	1,083,833
Paveh	51,755	56,837	60,431
Qasr-e Shirin	19,821	25,517	23,929
Ravansar	44,983	46,395	47,657
Sahneh	75,827	76,678	70,757
Salas-e Babajani	37,056	38,475	35,219
Sarpol-e Zahab	81,428	85,616	85,342
Eslamabad-e Gharb	149,376	151,473	140,876
Sonqor	95,904	91,935	81,661
Total	1,842,457	1,945,227	1,952,434

=== Cities ===
According to the 2016 census, 1,468,615 people (over 75% of the population of Kermanshah province) live in the following settlements:

Settlement	Population
Banevreh	3,187
Bayangan	1,513
Bisotun	4,942
Eslamabad-e Gharb	90,559
Ezgeleh	1,502
Gahvareh	4,050
Gilan-e Gharb	22,331
Gowdin	2,629
Halashi	804
Harsin	44,146
Homeyl	1,317
Javanrud	54,354
Kangavar	51,352
Kerend-e Gharb	7,798
Kermanshah	946,651
Kuzaran	4,007
Miyan Rahan	695
Nowdeshah	3,683
Nowsud	1,949
Paveh	25,771
Qasr-e Shirin	18,473
Ravansar	24,527
Robat	823
Sahneh	35,508
Sarmast	2,913
Sarpol-e Zahab	45,481
Satar	1,048
Shahrak-e Rijab	3,907
Shahu	3,558
Sonqor	44,256
Sumar	180
Tazehabad	14,701

== Geography ==
Kermanshah province is located in western Iran. It shares borders with the provinces of Kurdistan, Hamadan, Lorestan, and Ilam within Iran. It also shares borders with the Iraqi governorates of Halabja, Sulaymaniyah and Diyala.

Major cities and towns besides the capital include Eslamabad-e Gharb, Gilan-e Gharb, Harsin, Javanrud, Kangavar, Paveh, Qasr-e Shirin, Ravansar, Sahneh, Sarpol-e Zahab, and Sonqor.

=== Climate ===
As it is situated between two cold and warm regions, Kermanshah Province enjoys a moderate and mountainous climate. It rains most in winter and is moderately warm in summer. The annual rainfall is 500 mm. The average temperature in the hottest months is above 22 °C.

=== City of Kermanshah ===
The province's capital is Kermanshah, located in the middle of the western part of Iran. The population of the city is 946,651 as of 2016. It is built on the slopes of Mt. Sefid Kooh and extended toward south during last two decades. The built-up areas run alongside Sarab River and Sarab Valley. The city's elevation averages about 1,350 meters above sea level.

The distance between Kermanshah and Tehran is 525 km. It is the trade center of rich agricultural region that produces grain, rice, vegetable, fruits, and oilseeds, and there are many industrial centers, oil and sugar refineries, and cement, textile and flour factories, etc. The airport (Shahid Ashrafi Esfahani Airport) is located in north east of the city, and the distance from Tehran is 413 km by air.

== Economy ==
=== International and border trade ===
Kermanshah province has 371 km of common border with Iraq. There are five official border markets in the province. Three of these neighbor the Kurdistan Region of Iraq and the other two the Iraqi central government (Khosravi, Sumar). Based on figures from 9 November 2021, with a share of 5.7 to 6 percent Kermanshah province is among the first five exporters of non-oil products of Iran. Around 30 to 35 percent of theses exports were from the province's own products. The highest share of exports belong to Parviz border which neighbors Iraqi Kurdistan followed by Khosravi and Sumar.

Exports from Kermanshah province hit $2.7 billion in the fiscal year 2021-22 (ending 20 March), registering a 15% growth compared with the previous year, according to a local official.

The province's share in Iran's total exports during the period stood at 10% in terms of tonnage and 12% in value.

Kermanshah's share in total exports to Iraq stood at 53% and share in non-oil goods reached 43%.

Non-oil exports from Kermanshah mainly include tomato and tomato paste, air conditioners, cheese, industrial oil and their derivatives, biscuit, different types of melon, watermelon, tile and ceramic, plastic bags, marble, yogurt, milk, cream, cucumber, eggplant, apple and melamine dishes.

=== Local products ===
Kermanshah lends its name to a type of Persian carpet named after the region. It also has famous sweets made of rice, locally known as Nan-e berenji. The other famous Kermanshahi good is a special kind of oil, locally known as Rüne Dân and globally in Iran known as Roghan Kermanshahi. The Giveh of Kermanshah known as Klash is the highest quality Giveh.

== Historical attractions ==
Various attractions exist that date from the pre-Islamic era, such as the Kohneh Bridge, to contemporary parks and museums. Some of the more popular sites are:

=== Bisotun ===
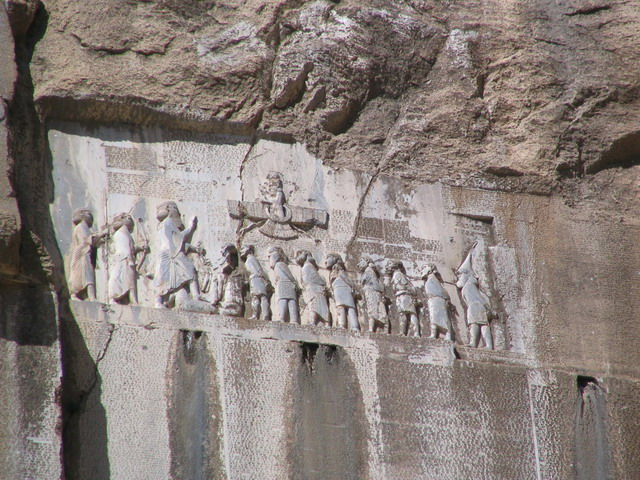
Darius the Great's Behistun inscription

Darius the Great's inscription at Bisotun, which dates to 522 BCE, lies some 1300 meters high in the mountains, and counts as one of the most famous sites in Near Eastern archeology. The site is a UNESCO World Heritage Site, and has been attracting visitors for centuries. The Behistun inscription is to Old Persian cuneiform what the Rosetta Stone is to Egyptian hieroglyphs: the trilingual inscription (in Old Persian, Elamite and Akkadian) was crucial in the decipherment of the script. The relief above the inscription depicts Darius facing nine rebels who objected to his crowning. At the king's feet lies Gaumata. The location of this important historical document is not coincidental: Gaumata, a usurper who is depicted as lying at Darius' feet, was a Medean and in Achaemenid times Behistun lay on the Medea-Parsa highway.

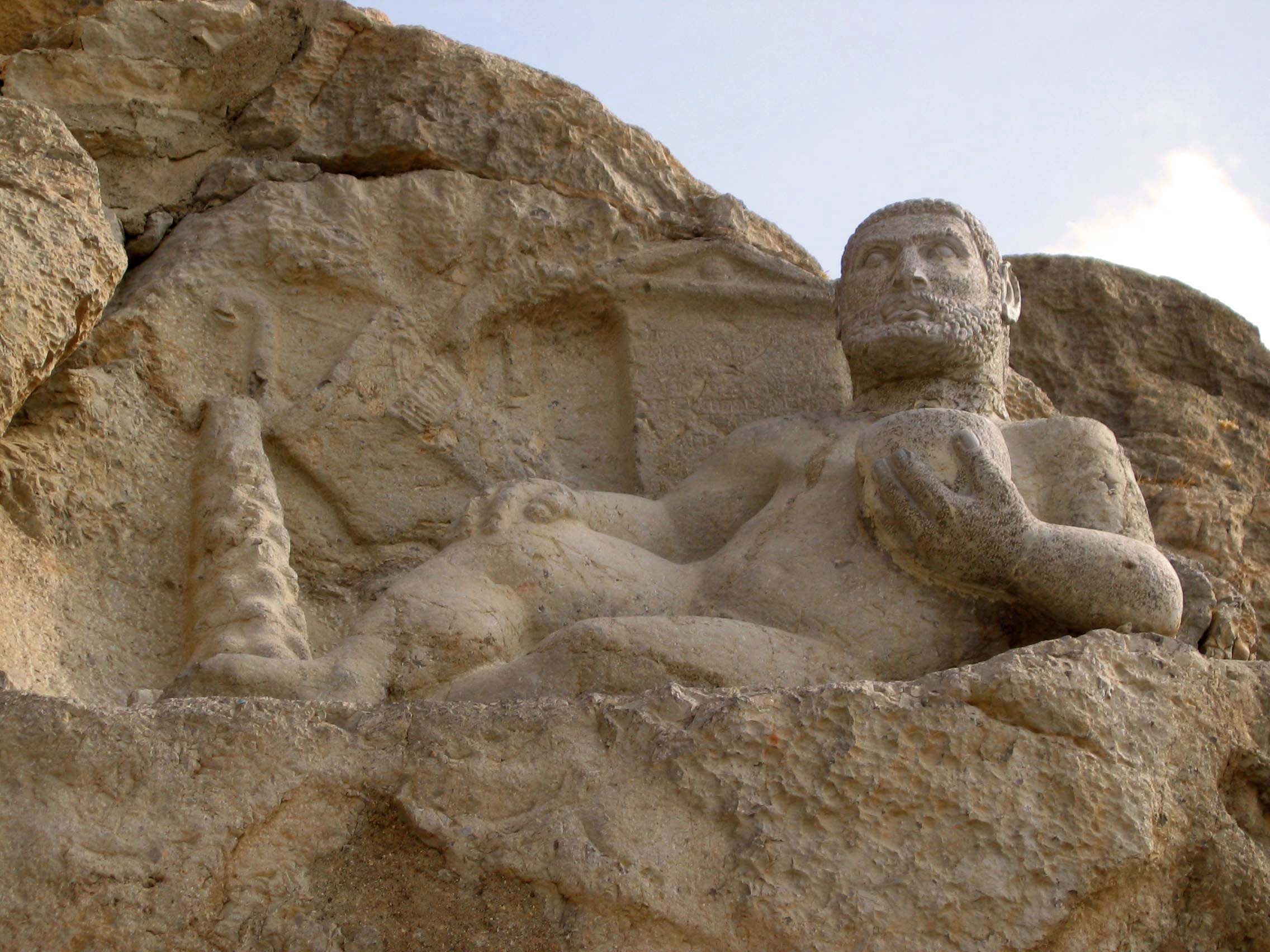
Hellenistic-era depiction of Bahram as Hercules.

Behistun is also notable for three reliefs at the foot of the hill that date from the Parthian era. Among them is a Hellenistic-era depiction of the divinity Bahram as the Greek hero Hercules, who reclines with a goblet in his hand, a club at his feet and a lion-skin beneath him. Because it lies on the route of an ancient highway, this life-size rock sculpture may reflect Bahram's status as patron divinity of travelers.

=== Taq-e Bostan ===
The rock reliefs at Taq-e Bostan lie 6 kilometres (4 mi) northeast of Kermanshah, where a spring gushes from a mountain cliff and empties into a large reflecting pool. One of the more impressive reliefs, inside the largest grotto (ivan), is the oversized depiction of Sassanid king Khosrau II (591–628 CE), who appears mounted on his favorite charger, Shabdiz. Both the horse and the rider are arrayed in full battle armor.
There are two hunting scenes on complementary sides of the ivan: one depicts an imperial boar hunt and the other depicting the king stalking deer. Elephants flush out the boar from a marshy lake for the king who stands poised with bow and arrow in hand while he is serenaded by female musicians following in other boats. These royal hunting scenes are narrative murals in stone are count among the most vivid of all Iranian rock reliefs.
The Taq-e Bostan reliefs are not limited to the Sassanid era. An upper relief depicts the 19th century Qajar king Fath-Ali shah holding court.

=== The Kangavar archaeological complex ===
Kangavar is the site of the archaeological remains of a vast Hellenic-style edifice on a raised platform. The visible remains at the site date to early Sassanid times, but the platform of the complex may be several centuries older. By the time excavation began in 1968, the complex had been preemptorily associated with a comment by Isidore of Charax who referred to a temple of Anahita at Concobar (the Greek name of Kangavar, which was then in Lower Medea). Despite archaeological findings to the contrary, the association with the divinity of fertility, healing, and wisdom has made the site a popular tourist attraction. The vast edifice was built of enormous blocks of dressed stone with an imposing entrance of opposed staircases that may have been inspired by the Apadana in Persepolis.

== Higher education ==
=== Higher education and research ===
1. Kermanshah University of Medical Sciences
2. Razi University
3. Islamic Azad University of Kermanshah

== Notable people ==
Mirza Ahmad Khan Motazed-Dowleh Vaziri

One of the renowned scientists and writers of this region is Al-Dinawari who was born at Dinawar north-east of Kermanshah. He lived in the 9th century and has written many books in astronomy, botany and history.

Notable people born in Kermansha include British author, Nobel Prize winner, Doris Lessing, whose father, a British Army officer, was stationed there at the time of her birth. Mirza Ahmad Khan Motazed-Dowleh Vaziri created the first printing office and founded the first private school of Kermanshahan. Guity Novin a painter and a graphic designer who has founded the Transpressionism movement was born in Kermanshah. The famous Sufi Scholar, Abdul Qader Gailani, was born in the region.

== See also ==
- History of Kermanshah
- Iran–Iraq War
- Kalhor
