= Torkeh =

Torkeh (Persian: تركه), also rendered as Torgeh, may refer to:

- Torkeh Dari
- Torkeh-ye Olya
- Torkeh-ye Sofla, Dalahu
- Torkeh-ye Sofla, Javanrud
