= Fuladi, Iran =

Fuladi (Persian: فولادي) in Iran may refer to:

- Fuladi, Kermanshah
- Fuladi-ye Olya, Kermanshah Province
- Fuladi-ye Sofla, Kermanshah Province
- Fuladi, Markazi
