= Cheshmeh Godar, Kermanshah =

Cheshmeh Godar چشمه گدار
- Village
- Location within Iran
- Coordinates: 34°46′30″N 46°22′52″E
- Country: Iran
- Province: Kermanshah
- County: Javanrud
- Bakhsh: Central
- Rural District: Bazan

Population (2006)
  - Total: 271
- Time zone: UTC+3:30 (IRST)
  - Summer (DST): UTC+4:30 (IRDT)

Cheshmeh Godar (Persian: چشمه گدار, Sorani Kurdish: کانی ویار, also Romanized as Cheshmeh Godār; also known as Cham Begār and Cheshmeh Zeylān) is a village in Bazan Rural District, in the Central District of Javanrud County, Kermanshah Province, Iran. At the 2006 census, its population was 271, in 59 families.
