= Bani Gomkan =

Bani Gomkan باني گمكان
- Village
- Location within Iran
- Coordinates: 34°42′53″N 46°20′55″E
- Country: Iran
- Province: Kermanshah
- County: Javanrud
- Bakhsh: Central
- Rural District: Bazan

Population (2006)
  - Total: 54
- Time zone: UTC+3:30 (IRST)
  - Summer (DST): UTC+4:30 (IRDT)

Bani Gomkan (Persian: باني گمكان, Sorani Kurdish: بانی گومکان، also Romanized as Bānī Gomkān; also known as Kānī Savārān (Persian: كاني سواران، Sorani Kurdish: کانی سواران) and Bānī Gomgān) is a village in Bazan Rural District, in the Central District of Javanrud County, Kermanshah Province, Iran. At the 2006 census, its population was 54, in 12 families.
