= Shuravash =

Shuravash (Persian: شورواش) may refer to:

- Shuravash-e Olya
- Shuravash-e Sofla
