= Khil (disambiguation) =

Khil or KHIL may refer to

- KHIL, a radio station serving Willcox, Arizona, United States
- Khil Raj Regmi (born 1949), Prime Minister of Nepal
- Eduard Khil (1934–2012), Soviet and Russian baritone singer
- Khil Fiat Kikan, a village in Iran

== See also ==
- Hil (disambiguation)
