= Kani Gol =

Kani Gol (Persian: كاني گل) may refer to:

- Kani Gol-e Olya
- Kani Gol-e Sofla
