= Chugolabad =

Chugolabad چوگل آباد
- Village
- Location within Iran
- Coordinates: 34°45′04″N 46°24′04″E
- Country: Iran
- Province: Kermanshah
- County: Javanrud
- Bakhsh: Central
- Rural District: Bazan

Population (2006)
  - Total: 95
- Time zone: UTC+3:30 (IRST)
  - Summer (DST): UTC+4:30 (IRDT)

Chugolabad (Persian: چوگل آباد, Sorani Kurdish: چوکوڵ ئاوا, also Romanized as Chūgolābād, Chūbābād or Chokl Abad) is a village in Bazan Rural District, in the Central District of Javanrud County, Kermanshah Province, Iran. At the 2006 census, its population was 95, in 17 families.
