= Torkeh-ye Sofla =

Torkeh-ye Sofla (Persian: تركه سفلي) may refer to:

- Torkeh-ye Sofla, Dalahu
- Torkeh-ye Sofla, Javanrud
