= Deh Rash =

Deh Rash (Persian: ده رش) may refer to:

- Deh Rash-e Bazan
- Deh Rash-e Nahrab
