= Bani Miran =

Bani Miran باني ميران
- Village
- Location within Iran
- Coordinates: 34°46′23″N 46°21′26″E
- Country: Iran
- Province: Kermanshah
- County: Javanrud
- Bakhsh: Central
- Rural District: Bazan

Population (2006)
  - Total: 148
- Time zone: UTC+3:30 (IRST)
  - Summer (DST): UTC+4:30 (IRDT)

Bani Miran (Persian: باني ميران, Sorani Kurdish: بانی مێران, also Romanized as Bānī Mīrān) is a village in Bazan Rural District, in the Central District of Javanrud County, Kermanshah Province, Iran. At the 2006 census, its population was 148, in 29 families.
