= Genani =

Genani گناني
- Village
- Location within Iran
- Coordinates: 34°45′41″N 46°17′39″E
- Country: Iran
- Province: Kermanshah
- County: Javanrud
- Bakhsh: Central
- Rural District: Bazan

Population (2006)
  - Total: 86
- Time zone: UTC+3:30 (IRST)
  - Summer (DST): UTC+4:30 (IRDT)

Genani (Persian: گناني, Sorani Kurdish: گنانی, also Romanized as Genānī) is a village in Bazan Rural District, in the Central District of Javanrud County, Kermanshah Province, Iran. At the 2006 census, its population was 86, in 15 families.
