= Bani Golan =

Bani Golan باني گلان
- Village
- Location within Iran
- Coordinates: 34°42′31″N 46°21′19″E
- Country: Iran
- Province: Kermanshah
- County: Javanrud
- Bakhsh: Central
- Rural District: Bazan

Population (2006)
  - Total: 109
- Time zone: UTC+3:30 (IRST)
  - Summer (DST): UTC+4:30 (IRDT)

Bani Golan (Persian: باني گلان, Sorani Kurdish: بانی گوڵان, also Romanized as Bānī Golān) is a village in Bazan Rural District, in the Central District of Javanrud County, Kermanshah Province, Iran. At the 2006 census, its population was 109, in 24 families.
