= Sarrud =

Sarrud (Persian: سررود) may refer to:

- Sarrud-e Olya
- Sarrud-e Sofla
- Sarrud-e Jonubi Rural District
- Sarrud-e Shomali Rural District
