= Badkan =

Badkan بادكان
- Village
- Location within Iran
- Coordinates: 34°48′32″N 46°26′30″E
- Country: Iran
- Province: Kermanshah
- County: Javanrud
- Bakhsh: Central
- Rural District: Palanganeh

Population (2006)
  - Total: 31
- Time zone: UTC+3:30 (IRST)
  - Summer (DST): UTC+4:30 (IRDT)

Badkan (Persian: بادكان, Sorani Kurdish: بادکان، also Romanized as Bādkān) is a village in Palanganeh Rural District, in the Central District of Javanrud County, Kermanshah Province, Iran. At the 2006 census, its population was 31, in 9 families.
