= Torkahpan =

Torkahpan تركه پان
- Village
- Location within Iran
- Coordinates: 34°47′31″N 46°32′42″E
- Country: Iran
- Province: Kermanshah
- County: Javanrud
- Bakhsh: Central
- Rural District: Palanganeh

Population (2006)
  - Total: 126
- Time zone: UTC+3:30 (IRST)
  - Summer (DST): UTC+4:30 (IRDT)

Torkahpan (Persian: تركه پان, also Romanized as Torkahpān; also known as Torkapān) is a village in Palanganeh Rural District, in the Central District of Javanrud County, Kermanshah Province, Iran. At the 2006 census, its population was 126, in 28 families.
