= Kani Gowhar =

Kani Gowhar كاني گوهر
- Village
- Location within Iran
- Coordinates: 34°46′47″N 46°25′56″E
- Country: Iran
- Province: Kermanshah
- County: Javanrud
- Bakhsh: Central
- Rural District: Palanganeh

Population (2006)
  - Total: 140
- Time zone: UTC+3:30 (IRST)
  - Summer (DST): UTC+4:30 (IRDT)

Kani Gowhar (Persian: كاني گوهر, also Romanized as Kānī Gowhar and Kanī Gowhar) is a village in Palanganeh Rural District, in the Central District of Javanrud County, Kermanshah Province, Iran. At the 2006 census, its population was 140, in 28 families.
