= Qalangeh =

Qalangeh قلانگه
- Village
- Country: Iran
- Province: Kermanshah
- County: Javanrud
- Bakhsh: Central
- Rural District: Bazan

Population (2006)
  - Total: 61
- Time zone: UTC+3:30 (IRST)
  - Summer (DST): UTC+4:30 (IRDT)

Qalangeh (Persian: قلانگه, also Romanized as Qalāngeh) is a village in Bazan Rural District, in the Central District of Javanrud County, Kermanshah Province, Iran. At the 2006 census, its population was 61, in 12 families.
