= Siaran-e Nahrab =

Siaran-e Nahrab سياران نهراب
- Village
- Country: Iran
- Province: Kermanshah
- County: Javanrud
- Bakhsh: Central
- Rural District: Bazan

Population (2006)
  - Total: 173
- Time zone: UTC+3:30 (IRST)
  - Summer (DST): UTC+4:30 (IRDT)

Siaran-e Nahrab (Persian: سياران نهراب, also Romanized as Sīārān-e Nahrāb) is a village in Bazan Rural District, in the Central District of Javanrud County, Kermanshah Province, Iran. At the 2006 census, its population was 173, in 37 families.
