= Birkdale, Southport =

Area of Southport, Merseyside, England

Coordinates: 53.632°N 3.010°W

Birkdale
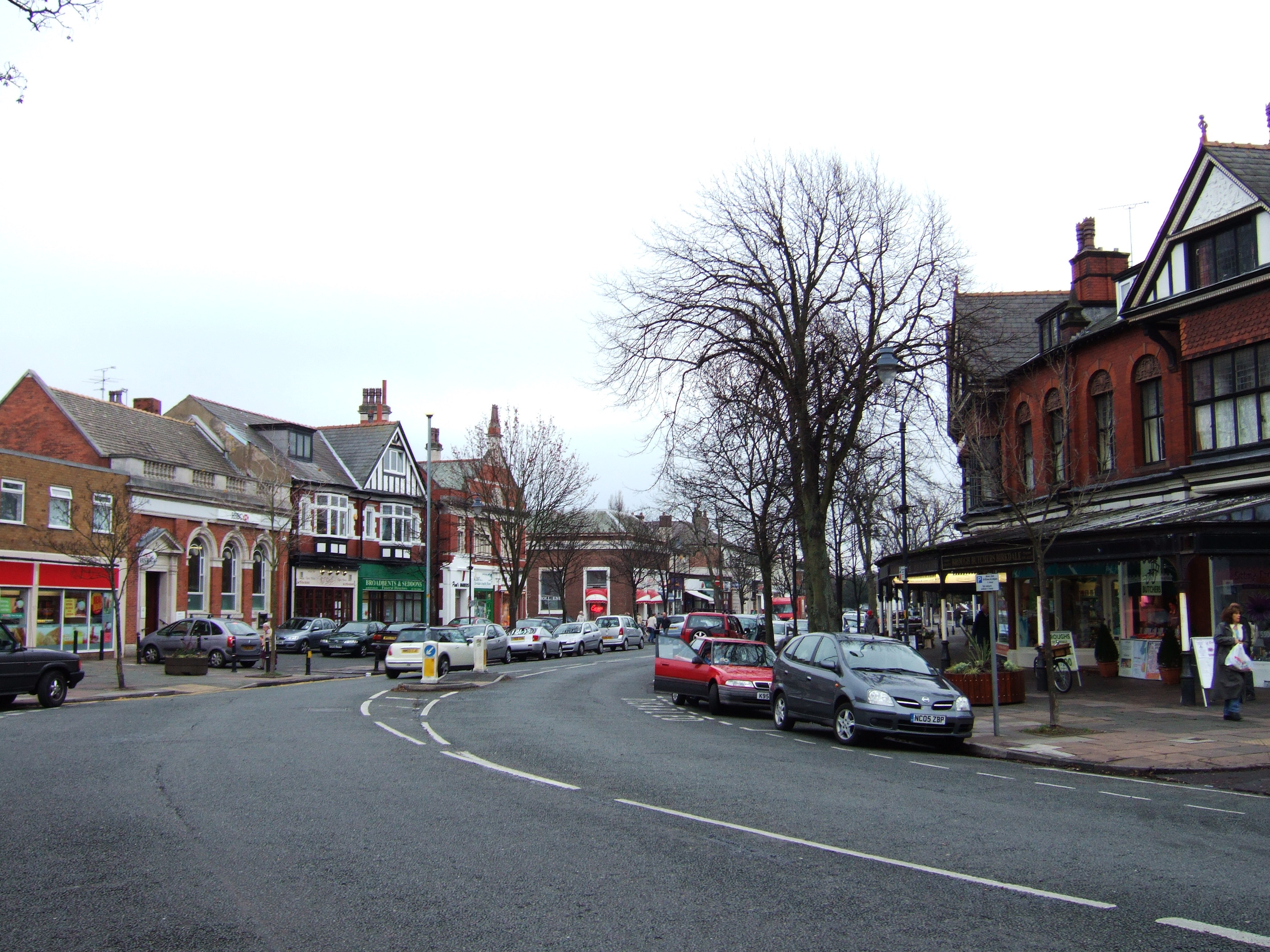
- Birkdale village centre

- Location in Southport Location within Merseyside
- Population: 12,689 (ward, 2021)
- OS grid reference: SD333155
- Metropolitan borough: Sefton
- Metropolitan county: Merseyside
- Region: North West
- Country: England
- Sovereign state: United Kingdom
- Post town: SOUTHPORT
- Postcode district: PR8
- Dialling code: 01704
- Police: Merseyside
- Fire: Merseyside
- Ambulance: North West
- UK Parliament: Southport

Birkdale is an area of Southport, within the Metropolitan Borough of Sefton, Merseyside, in the north-west of England. The area is on the Irish Sea coast, and forms the southern part of Southport's built-up area.

At the 2021 census, the population of Birkdale ward (which includes Hillside) was 12,689. This does not include the area west of the railway line, which is part of Duke's ward.

== History ==
Birkdale probably takes its name from two Old Norse words, birki meaning "birch-copse" and dalr meaning "dale" or "valley". The area was developed in the Victorian era; an Ordnance Survey map of 1848 shows the newly built Liverpool, Crosby and Southport Railway passing through farmland all the way to Southport station, while an 1894 map has Birkdale station surrounded by many streets lined with houses, as well as churches, schools and the Palace Hotel.

== Geography ==
Birkdale lies immediately south of Southport's central area. It is bounded to the east by the farmland of Halsall parish, to the south by Hillside and the Birkdale Hills, with Ainsdale beyond, and to the west by the coastal road overlooking Birkdale Sands.

== Governance ==
Southport is unparished, and all local government functions are carried out by Sefton Council which is a metropolitan district council. Birkdale ward and Duke's ward (which extends beyond Birkdale into the centre of Southport) each elect three councillors.

Birkdale is part of the Southport constituency for elections to the Parliament of the United Kingdom, where it has been represented since 2024 by Patrick Hurley for the Labour Party.

Birkdale was formerly a township and chapelry in the parish of North Meols. In 1866 Birkdale became a separate civil parish, and in 1894 it became an urban district which from 1905 also contained the parish of Ainsdale. On 1 April 1912 the district and parish were abolished and merged with Southport. In 1911 the parish had a population of 15,900.

Until 1 April 1974, Birkdale lay in the county of Lancashire.

== Religious sites ==
There are three Church of England parishes, each with 19th-century churches: St Peter's (centrally placed, completed 1871, tower added 1887); St James' (north-west, 1857); and St John's (south, 1890, enlarged 1909).

The Catholic church of St Joseph was completed in 1867 to designs of E. W. Pugin. Our Lady of Lourdes at Hillside (1956) is in the same parish. Another offshoot of St Joseph's is St Teresa of Avila (1898).

Birkdale also has Evangelical, Methodist and United Reformed churches.

== Sport ==
Birkdale receives sporting attention every few years when the Royal Birkdale golf course hosts The Open Championship, most recently in July 2026. Trafalgar Road, the home ground of the Southport and Birkdale Cricket Club, is used for county-level cricket matches approximately once a year. Southport and Birkdale squash club also play here and are in the North West Counties Squash League.

Red Rum, a racehorse trained by Ginger McCain, had his stables in Upper Aughton Road in Birkdale, while a horse named after the village took part and finished tenth in the 2002 Grand National. Birkdale United AFC played a crucial part in the footballing education of Premiership footballers such as Jack Rodwell, Dominic Matteo, Shaun Teale and Paul Dalglish, and still has its home in the village, fielding teams for boys from the age of 6 and girls from the age of 7 through to open age teams. The club was presented the FA's highest accolade in January 2008, becoming the first FA Charter Community Club in Southport.

== Education ==
Birkdale has three secondary schools: Christ the King Catholic High School, which has around 1,200 pupils including sixth form students; Birkdale High School which is for boys; and Greenbank High School (in the part of Birkdale known as Hillside) for girls.

== Amenities ==
The area has two stations – Birkdale and Hillside – on Merseyrail's Northern line, which connects Southport with Liverpool.

== Notable people ==
- Richard Corbett MEP lived in Birkdale until the age of 8 and attended Farnborough Road School
- Novelist J. G. Farrell, twice a Booker Prize winner, was evacuated to Birkdale during WW2
- Private Richard George Masters, soldier awarded the Victoria Cross for actions on 9 April 1918, born in Birkdale
- Comedian Lee Mack was a pupil at Birkdale County Junior School
- Marcus Morris was vicar of St James' Church, Lulworth Road, in the 1940s and 50s
- Albert Pierrepoint, the most famous British hangman of modern times, lived in Birkdale in later life and had a tobacconist's shop in Birkdale village.
- Jack Rodwell, Sunderland A.F.C. Midfielder
- Historian A. J. P. Taylor was born in Birkdale in 1906

== See also ==
- Listed buildings in Birkdale
- Birkdale Palace railway station
- Birkdale Village, an urban development in Huntersville, North Carolina, United States
