= Biashush =

Biashush بياشوش
- Village
- Location within Iran
- Coordinates: 34°48′18″N 46°33′46″E
- Country: Iran
- Province: Kermanshah
- County: Javanrud
- Bakhsh: Central
- Rural District: Palanganeh

Population (2006)
  - Total: 748
- Time zone: UTC+3:30 (IRST)
  - Summer (DST): UTC+4:30 (IRDT)

Biashush (Persian: بياشوش, Sorani Kurdish: بیاشۆش, also Romanized as Bīāshūsh and Beyā Shūsh) is a village in Palanganeh Rural District, in the Central District of Javanrud County, Kermanshah Province, Iran. At the 2006 census, its population was 748, in 163 families.
