= Cheshmeh Balvark =

Cheshmeh Balvark چشمه بلورك
- Village
- Country: Iran
- Province: Kermanshah
- County: Javanrud
- Bakhsh: Central
- Rural District: Bazan

Population (2006)
  - Total: 78
- Time zone: UTC+3:30 (IRST)
  - Summer (DST): UTC+4:30 (IRDT)

Cheshmeh Balvark (Persian: چشمه بلورك, Sorani Kurdish: کانی بلوەرک) is a village in Bazan Rural District, in the Central District of Javanrud County, Kermanshah Province, Iran. At the 2006 census, its population was 78, in 16 families.
