= Church of St Teresa of Avila, Birkdale =

Coordinates: 53.6341°N 3.0073°W

Church of St Teresa of Avila
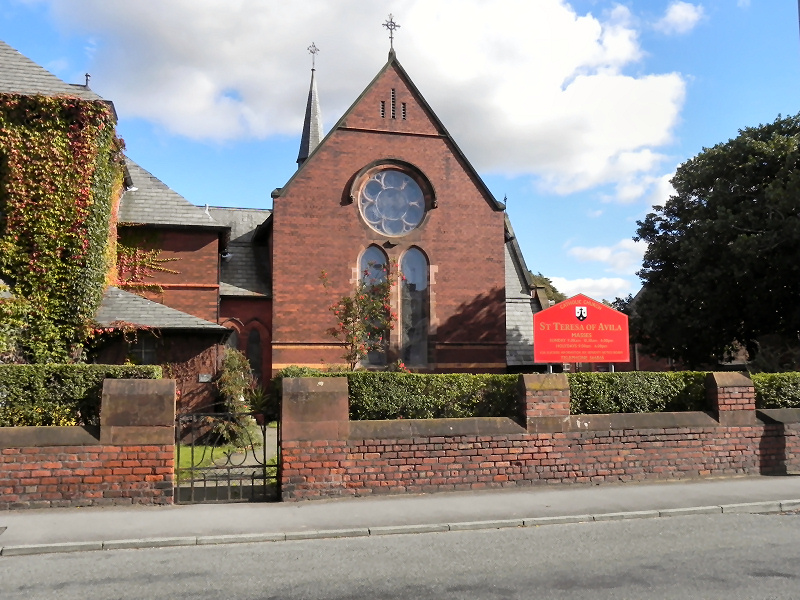
- West end of the Church of St Teresa of Avila

- Location in Southport
- OS grid reference: SD 335 158
- Location: Everton Road, Birkdale, Southport, Sefton, Merseyside
- Country: England
- Denomination: Roman Catholic
- Website: St Teresa, Birkdale

History
- Status: Parish church
- Dedication: Saint Teresa of Ávila

Architecture
- Functional status: Active
- Heritage designation: Grade II
- Designated: 29 July 1999
- Architect(s): Sinnott, Sinnott and Powell
- Architectural type: Church
- Style: Gothic Revival (Early English)
- Groundbreaking: 1897
- Completed: 1898

Specifications
- Materials: Brick with dressings in sandstone and terracotta; Slate roofs

Administration
- Diocese: Roman Catholic Diocese of Liverpool

Clergy
- Priest: Canon J. J. Gaine

The Church of St Teresa of Avila in Everton Road, Birkdale, Southport, Sefton, Merseyside, England, is an active Roman Catholic church in the diocese of Liverpool. It was built in 1897–98 and designed by the architectural partnership of James Sinnott, Bernard Sinnott & Daniel Powell. The church, together with its attached presbytery, is recorded in the National Heritage List for England as a designated Grade II listed building.

== History ==
St Teresa's was founded as an "offshoot" of St Joseph's Church, Birkdale. It was built in 1897–98 and was designed by Sinnott, Sinnott and Powell. The sanctuary was remodelled in the 1950s when it was panelled with marble, and the church was reordered later in the 20th century, when the altar was brought forward.

== Architecture ==
=== Church exterior ===
The church is constructed in red brick with dressings of red sandstone and some buff terracotta, and has a slate roof. It is in Early English style. The church has a cruciform plan consisting of a narrow nave that opens out into full-height north and south two-bay aisles, each of which extends into a short transept, and a chancel. There is a flèche over the crossing, and a bellcote on the gable of the north transept. At the west end of the nave are two lancet windows with a rose window above, and a cross on the apex of the gable. On the south side of the church is a gabled porch, and there is a doorway on the south side of the south aisle. There are more lancet windows along the sides of the nave, and in the aisles and transepts.

=== Church interior ===
Inside the church are two-bay arcades on the north and south sides of the crossing carried on cylindrical sandstone piers that have capitals carved with foliage. The high altar and the reredos in the chancel are carved with angels and with the words "Ecce Panis Angelorum". The chapel in the south transept also has an altar, and a reredos that is carved with the figure of Saint Teresa. In the nave windows is a scheme of stained glass by Earley and Company depicting English martyrs and saints, and elsewhere there are windows by Hardman. The two-manual pipe organ was built by Ainscough of Preston in about 1910.

=== Presbytery ===
The presbytery is joined to the north side of the church, and has a square plan with a lean-to porch on the south side. It is built in brick with a hipped slate roof, and is in two storeys with attics. The two-bay west front contains a canted bay window on the right, a three-light mullioned window to the left, and two similar three-light windows in the upper floor. On the west and south sides are dormers with hipped roofs and finials, and on the apex of the roof is a cruciform chimney stack.

== Appraisal ==
The church and presbytery were designated as a Grade II listed building on 29 July 1999. Grade II is the lowest of the three grades of listing and is applied to buildings that are "nationally important and of special interest".

== See also ==
- Listed buildings in Birkdale
