= Dorothy Mary Saunders =

Canadian-born British nurse (1896–1962)

Dorothy Mary Saunders (October 6, 1896 – March 26, 1962) was a Canadian-born British nurse and medical missionary who worked with the Church Mission Society (CMS), primarily in Northern Nigeria. Her work, which included nursing and midwifery, spanned a thirty-one year period of African colonial history and Christian Missionary Society expansion.

== Early life and education ==
Saunders was born on October 6, 1896, in Esquimalt, Canada. Her parents, both British subjects who had emigrated to Canada, were William Hooper Saunders and Mary Ann "Marie" Sharp. Her father died on October 31, 1896, weeks after her birth. Her mother remarried around 1910 to Charles Frederick Emerson and gave birth to Dorothy's half-brother.

Saunders relocated to England, living in Southport, Lancashire in 1911, and began her education at Dayfield School, Birkdale, Lancashire. She trained at St Thomas' Hospital from 1919–1923, an institution whose nursing school was founded by Florence Nightingale. She then worked at Brighton & Hove Hospital for Women (1923–1924), a specialized women-only facility. She achieved the professional status of State Registered Nurse (S.R.N.) and State Certified Midwife (S.C.M.) and prepared for mission service at Kennaway Hall, the Church Missionary Society's training center for female missionaries.

== Career ==
Saunders' first assignment was the CMS Palestine Mission-Salt in Salt, Transjordan. She arrived in June 1925, alongside other English staff.

Saunders was transferred to the Northern Nigeria Mission on November 24, 1926. Her assignment coincided with the formal reopening of the Northern Nigeria Medical Mission by the Medical Committee. She held the duty of superintending the nursing at the mission. Her reports detailed the ethical and financial challenges she faced, questioning the conflict over charging fees: "How can we teach the love and compassion of Christ while we haggle for fees and are harassed by every shilling we spend?" Her community duties extended to the Women's Guild and practical education at the Blind Mission in the region.

== Later life and death ==
After retiring, Saunders chose to remain in Nigeria to continue supporting the local Christian community by engaging in Women's Guild work. Saunders died in on March 26, 1962, aged 65, in Kaduna.
