= Kani Gol-e Sofla =

Kani Gol-e Sofla كاني گل سفلي
- Village
- Location within Iran
- Coordinates: 34°45′38″N 46°28′54″E
- Country: Iran
- Province: Kermanshah
- County: Javanrud
- Bakhsh: Central
- Rural District: Palanganeh

Population (2006)
  - Total: 151
- Time zone: UTC+3:30 (IRST)
  - Summer (DST): UTC+4:30 (IRDT)

Kani Gol-e Sofla (Persian: كاني گل سفلي, also Romanized as Kānī Gol-e Soflá) is a village in Palanganeh Rural District, in the Central District of Javanrud County, Kermanshah Province, Iran. At the 2006 census, its population was 151, in 31 families.
