= Sarrud-e Olya =

Sarrud-e Olya سررودعليا
- Village
- Location within Iran
- Coordinates: 34°48′27″N 46°32′50″E
- Country: Iran
- Province: Kermanshah
- County: Javanrud
- Bakhsh: Central
- Rural District: Palanganeh

Population (2006)
  - Total: 295
- Time zone: UTC+3:30 (IRST)
  - Summer (DST): UTC+4:30 (IRDT)

Sarrud-e Olya (Persian: سررودعليا, also Romanized as Sarrūd-e ‘Olyā) is a village in Palanganeh Rural District, in the Central District of Javanrud County, Kermanshah Province, Iran. At the 2006 census, its population was 295, in 64 families.
