= Kalley =

Kalley may refer to:

- Robert Reid Kalley (1809-1888), Scottish physician and missionary
- Kalley, Kermanshah, a village in Iran
