= Fuladi-ye Sofla =

Fuladi-ye Sofla فولادي سفلي
- Village
- Location within Iran
- Coordinates: 34°45′33″N 46°24′32″E
- Country: Iran
- Province: Kermanshah
- County: Javanrud
- Bakhsh: Central
- Rural District: Bazan

Population (2006)
  - Total: 194
- Time zone: UTC+3:30 (IRST)
  - Summer (DST): UTC+4:30 (IRDT)

Fuladi-ye Sofla (Persian: فولادي سفلي, Sorani Kurdish: پۆڵایی خوارو, also Romanized as Fūlādī-ye Soflá; also known as Fūlādī-ye Pā’īn) is a village in Bazan Rural District, in the Central District of Javanrud County, Kermanshah Province, Iran. At the 2006 census, its population was 194, in 45 families.
