= Safiabad, Javanrud =

Village in Kermanshah province, Iran

Safiabad Persian: صفي اباد
- Village
- Location within Iran
- Coordinates: 34°47′36″N 46°30′54″E
- Country: Iran
- Province: Kermanshah
- County: Javanrud
- District: Central
- Rural District: Palanganeh

Population (2016)
  - Total: 2,402
- Time zone: UTC+3:30 (IRST)

Safiabad (Persian: صفي اباد) (Note: Also romanized as Şafīābād) is a village in Palanganeh Rural District of the Central District of Javanrud County, Kermanshah province, Iran.

== Demographics ==
=== Population ===
At the time of the 2006 National Census, the village's population was 901 in 203 households. The following census in 2011 counted 1,671 people in 451 households. The 2016 census measured the population of the village as 2,402 people in 677 households. It was the most populous village in its rural district.
