= Kalley, Kermanshah =

Kalley كلي
- Village
- Location within Iran
- Coordinates: 34°47′21″N 46°33′24″E
- Country: Iran
- Province: Kermanshah
- County: Javanrud
- Bakhsh: Central
- Rural District: Palanganeh

Population (2006)
  - Total: 148
- Time zone: UTC+3:30 (IRST)
  - Summer (DST): UTC+4:30 (IRDT)

Kalley (Persian: كلي, also Romanized as Kaley) is a village in Palanganeh Rural District, in the Central District of Javanrud County, Kermanshah Province, Iran. At the 2006 census, its population was 148, in 30 families.
