= Deh Rash-e Bazan =

Deh Rash-e Bazan ده رش بازان
- Village
- Location within Iran
- Coordinates: 34°45′01″N 46°23′33″E
- Country: Iran
- Province: Kermanshah
- County: Javanrud
- Bakhsh: Central
- Rural District: Bazan

Population (2006)
  - Total: 66
- Time zone: UTC+3:30 (IRST)
  - Summer (DST): UTC+4:30 (IRDT)

Deh Rash-e Bazan (Persian: ده رش بازان, Sorani Kurdish: دێرەشی بازان, also Romanized as Deh Rash-e Bāzān; also known as Deh Rash) is a village in Bazan Rural District, in the Central District of Javanrud County, Kermanshah Province, Iran. At the 2006 census, its population was 66, in 10 families.
