= Sarrud-e Sofla =

Sarrud-e Sofla سررودسفلي
- Village
- Location within Iran
- Coordinates: 34°48′21″N 46°32′34″E
- Country: Iran
- Province: Kermanshah
- County: Javanrud
- Bakhsh: Central
- Rural District: Palanganeh

Population (2006)
  - Total: 184
- Time zone: UTC+3:30 (IRST)
  - Summer (DST): UTC+4:30 (IRDT)

Sarrud-e Sofla (Persian: سررودسفلي, also Romanized as Sarrūd-e Soflá) is a village in Palanganeh Rural District, in the Central District of Javanrud County, Kermanshah Province, Iran. At the 2006 census, its population was 184, in 37 families.
