= Saru Khan =

Village in Kermanshah province, Iran

Saru Khan Persian: ساروخان
- Village
- Location within Iran
- Coordinates: 34°46′55″N 46°29′21″E
- Country: Iran
- Province: Kermanshah
- County: Javanrud
- District: Central
- Rural District: Palanganeh

Population (2016)
  - Total: 135
- Time zone: UTC+3:30 (IRST)

Saru Khan (Persian: ساروخان) (Note: Also romanized as Sarūkhān; also known as Sārūk Khān) is a village in, and the capital of, Palanganeh Rural District of the Central District of Javanrud County, Kermanshah province, Iran.

== Demographics ==
=== Population ===
At the time of the 2006 National Census, the village's population was 152 in 31 households. The following census in 2011 counted 150 people in 32 households. The 2016 census measured the population of the village as 135 people in 35 households.
