= Torkeh-ye Olya =

Torkeh-ye Olya تركه عليا
- Village
- Location within Iran
- Coordinates: 34°46′00″N 46°30′00″E
- Country: Iran
- Province: Kermanshah
- County: Javanrud
- Bakhsh: Central
- Rural District: Palanganeh

Population (2006)
  - Total: 14
- Time zone: UTC+3:30 (IRST)
  - Summer (DST): UTC+4:30 (IRDT)

Torkeh-ye Olya (Persian: تركه عليا, also Romanized as Torkeh-ye ‘Olyā) is a village in Palanganeh Rural District, in the Central District of Javanrud County, Kermanshah Province, Iran. At the 2006 census, its population was 14 people, dispersed into 5 families.
