= Fuladi-ye Olya =

Fuladi-ye Olya فولادي عليا
- Village
- Location within Iran
- Coordinates: 34°45′28″N 46°24′02″E
- Country: Iran
- Province: Kermanshah
- County: Javanrud
- Bakhsh: Central
- Rural District: Bazan

Population (2006)
  - Total: 143
- Time zone: UTC+3:30 (IRST)
  - Summer (DST): UTC+4:30 (IRDT)

Fuladi-ye Olya (Persian: فولادي عليا, Sorani Kurdish: پۆڵایی ژوورو, also romanized as Fūlādī-ye ‘Olyā; also known as Fūlādī-ye Bālā) is a village in Bazan Rural District, in the Central District of Javanrud County, Kermanshah Province, Iran. At the 2006 census, its population was 143, in 29 families.
