= Khil Fiat Kikan =

Khil Fiat Kikan خيل فيات كي كن
- Village
- Country: Iran
- Province: Kermanshah
- County: Javanrud
- Bakhsh: Central
- Rural District: Bazan

Population (2006)
  - Total: 110
- Time zone: UTC+3:30 (IRST)
  - Summer (DST): UTC+4:30 (IRDT)

Khil Fiat Kikan (Persian: خيل فيات كي كن, also Romanized as Khīl Fīāt Kīkan) is a village in Bazan Rural District, in the Central District of Javanrud County, Kermanshah Province, Iran. At the 2006 census, its population was 110, in 20 families.
