= Shuravash-e Olya =

Shuravash-e Olya شورواش عليا
- Village
- Country: Iran
- Province: Kermanshah
- County: Javanrud
- Bakhsh: Central
- Rural District: Bazan

Population (2006)
  - Total: 37
- Time zone: UTC+3:30 (IRST)
  - Summer (DST): UTC+4:30 (IRDT)

Shuravash-e Olya (Persian: شورواش عليا, also Romanized as Shūravāsh-e ‘Olyā) is a village in Bazan Rural District, in the Central District of Javanrud County, Kermanshah Province, Iran. At the 2006 census, its population was 37, in 5 families.
