= Kani Gol-e Olya =

Kani Gol-e Olya كاني گل عليا
- Village
- Location within Iran
- Coordinates: 34°45′40″N 46°26′38″E
- Country: Iran
- Province: Kermanshah
- County: Javanrud
- Bakhsh: Central
- Rural District: Palanganeh

Population (2006)
  - Total: 165
- Time zone: UTC+3:30 (IRST)
  - Summer (DST): UTC+4:30 (IRDT)

Kani Gol-e Olya (Persian: كاني گل عليا, also Romanized as Kānī Gol-e ‘Olyā; also known as Kānī Gol-e Bālā) is a village in Palanganeh Rural District, in the Central District of Javanrud County, Kermanshah Province, Iran. At the 2006 census, its population was 165, in 31 families.
