= Zeylan, Iran =

Village in Kermanshah province, Iran

Zeylan Persian: زلان
- Village
- Location within Iran
- Coordinates: 34°47′00″N 46°20′56″E
- Country: Iran
- Province: Kermanshah
- County: Javanrud
- District: Central
- Rural District: Bazan

Population (2016)
  - Total: 1,557
- Time zone: UTC+3:30 (IRST)

Zeylan (Persian: زلان) (Note: Also romanized as Zeylān; also known as Zalān) is a village in, and the capital of, Bazan Rural District of the Central District of Javanrud County, Kermanshah province, Iran.

== Demographics ==
=== Population ===
At the time of the 2006 National Census, the village's population was 1,432 in 316 households. The following census in 2011 counted 1,509 people in 386 households. The 2016 census measured the population of the village as 1,557 people in 439 households. It was the most populous village in its rural district.
