= Nahrab-e Deh Rash =

Nahrab-e Deh Rash نهراب ده رش
- Village
- Location within Iran
- Coordinates: 34°41′47″N 46°22′08″E
- Country: Iran
- Province: Kermanshah
- County: Javanrud
- Bakhsh: Central
- Rural District: Bazan

Population (2006)
  - Total: 260
- Time zone: UTC+3:30 (IRST)
  - Summer (DST): UTC+4:30 (IRDT)

Nahrab-e Deh Rash (Persian: نهراب ده رش, also Romanized as Nahrāb-e Deh Rash; also known as Deh Rash and Deh Rash-e Nahrāb) is a village in Bazan Rural District, in the Central District of Javanrud County, Kermanshah Province, Iran. At the 2006 census, its population was 260, in 57 families.
