= Torkeh-ye Sofla, Javanrud =

Torkeh-ye Sofla تركه سفلي
- Village
- Location within Iran
- Coordinates: 34°45′39″N 46°29′36″E
- Country: Iran
- Province: Kermanshah
- County: Javanrud
- Bakhsh: Central
- Rural District: Palanganeh

Population (2006)
  - Total: 43
- Time zone: UTC+3:30 (IRST)
  - Summer (DST): UTC+4:30 (IRDT)

Torkeh-ye Sofla (Persian: تركه سفلي, also Romanized as Torkeh-ye Soflá; also known as Torgeh) is a village in Palanganeh Rural District, in the Central District of Javanrud County, Kermanshah Province, Iran. At the 2006 census, its population was 43, in 12 families.
