= St James' Church, Birkdale =

Coordinates: 53.6383°N 3.0195°W

St James' Church
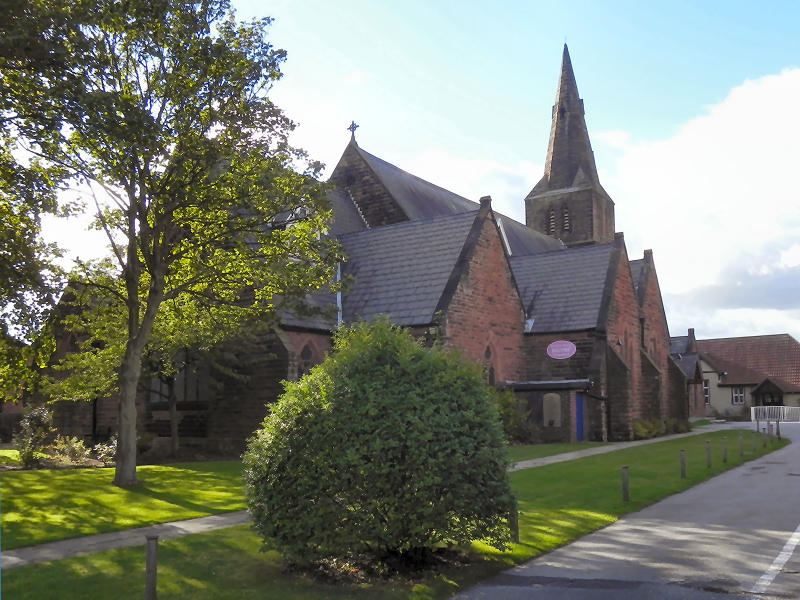
- St James' Church, from the northeast

- Location in Southport
- OS grid reference: SD 3269 1625
- Location: Lulworth Road, Birkdale, Southport, Sefton, Merseyside
- Country: England
- Denomination: Anglican
- Website: St James, Birkdale

History
- Status: Parish church

Architecture
- Functional status: Active
- Heritage designation: Grade II
- Designated: 29 July 1999
- Architect(s): A. Rimmer, J. F. Doyle
- Architectural type: Church
- Style: Gothic Revival
- Groundbreaking: 1856

Specifications
- Materials: Sandstone, slate roofs

Administration
- Province: York
- Diocese: Liverpool
- Archdeaconry: Warrington
- Deanery: North Meols
- Parish: St James, Birkdale

Clergy
- Vicar: Rev Sam Johnson

St James' Church is in Lulworth Road, Birkdale, Southport, Sefton, Merseyside, England, and is an active Anglican parish church in the diocese of Liverpool. It was built between 1856 and 1857, and later extended. One of its former vicars was Revd Marcus Morris, the founder of the comic the Eagle. The church is recorded in the National Heritage List for England as a designated Grade II listed building.

== History ==
St James' was built between 1856 and 1857 as part of the planned development of Birkdale, a district to the south of Southport. It was designed by A. Rimmer, and enlarged later by J. F. Doyle. From 1945 to 1950 the vicar of the church was Revd Marcus Morris, the founder of the comic the Eagle, which was first published in 1950. Between 2002 and 2003 the church was extensively re-ordered, and in 2014 work began on repairs to the spire, whose ironwork has corroded.

== Architecture ==
=== Exterior ===
The church is constructed in coursed rock-faced red sandstone rubble, and it has slate roofs. The architectural style is that of about 1300. Its plan consists of a west steeple with protruding gabled north and south porches, a nave, the second bays of which are gabled, north and south transepts, each of which has a pair of gables, and a large chancel with gabled offices to the south. The steeple consists of a four-stage tower with a broach spire. The tower has angle buttresses, a two-light west window, and paired lancet bell openings. On the steeple are two tiers of lucarnes. In the walls of the nave and transepts are three-light windows, and the large east window has five lights.

=== Interior ===
Inside, the church is a single vessel, with no division between the nave and the chancel. Between the gables of the transepts are piers of polished granite. In the south transept and on the south side of the nave are stained glass windows dating from about 1910 by Shrigley and Hunt. On the north side is a window of 1965 by Harcourt M. Doyle depicting famous women, including Gladys Aylward. The three-manual pipe organ was built by William Hill & Sons in 1894, and was rebuilt in 1988 and again in 2003 by George Sixsmith & Company.

== Appraisal ==
The church was designated as a Grade II listed building on 29 July 1999. Grade II is the lowest of the three grades of listing and is applied to buildings that are "nationally important and of special interest".

== Present day ==
St James' is an active Anglican church in the deanery of North Meols, the archdeaconry of Warrington, and the diocese of Liverpool. The church arranges services on Sundays and during the week, prayer meetings, interest groups, and runs children's groups, including Scouts and Guides.

== See also ==
- Listed buildings in Birkdale
