= St John's Church, Birkdale =

Coordinates: 53.6228°N 3.0138°W

St John's Church
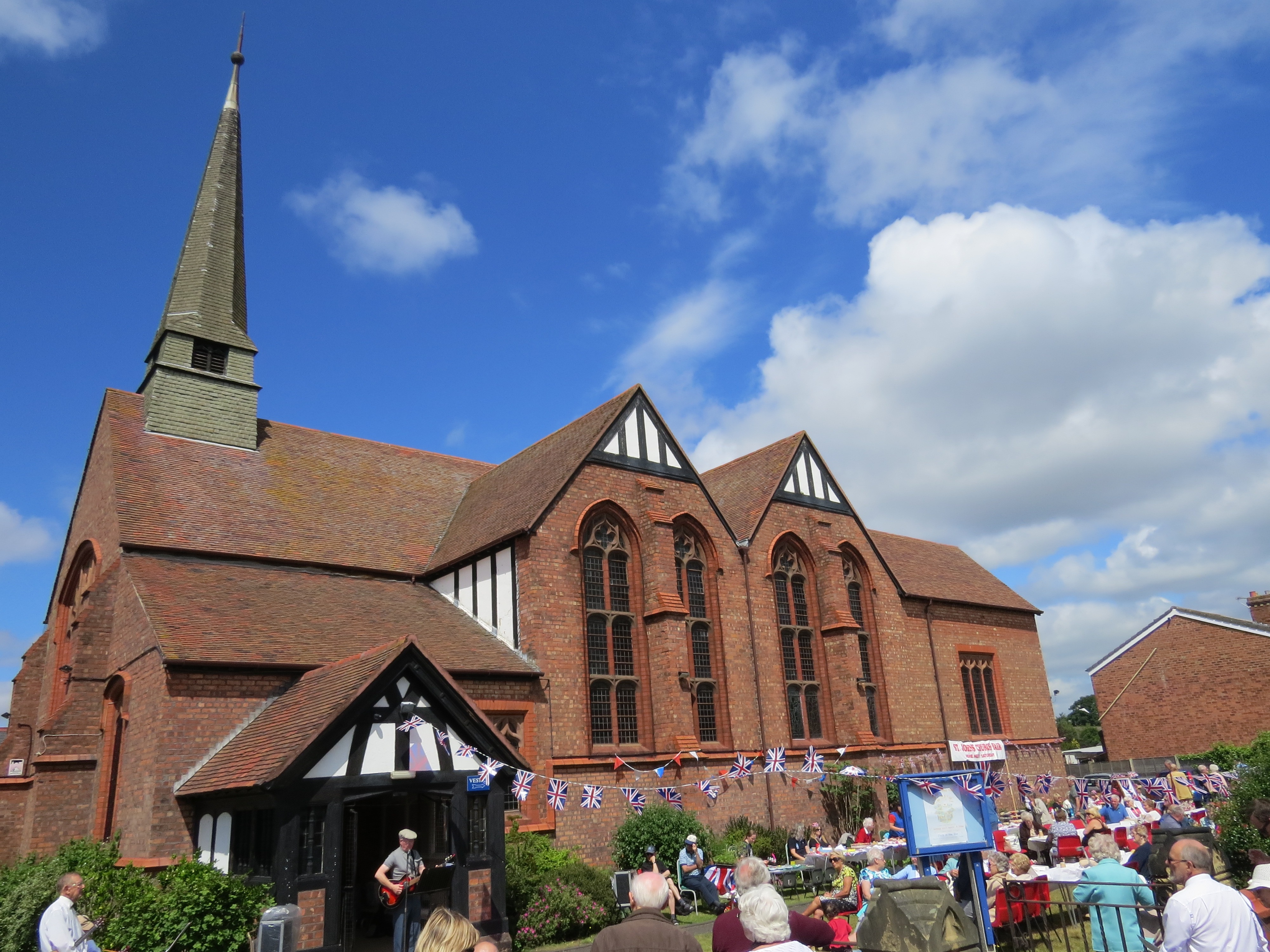
- Celebration of the Queen's 90th Birthday, 18 June 2016

- Location in Southport
- OS grid reference: SD 330,145
- Location: St John's Road, Birkdale, Southport, Merseyside
- Country: England
- Denomination: Anglican
- Churchmanship: Conservative Evangelical
- Website: St John, Birkdale

History
- Status: Parish church

Architecture
- Functional status: Active
- Heritage designation: Grade II
- Designated: 29 July 1999
- Architect(s): Paley, Austin and Paley; Austin and Paley
- Architectural type: Church
- Style: Gothic Revival
- Groundbreaking: 1889
- Completed: 1910

Specifications
- Materials: Brick with terracotta and sandstone dressings Red tiled roofs

Administration
- Province: York
- Diocese: Liverpool
- Archdeaconry: Warrington
- Deanery: North Meols
- Parish: St John, Birkdale

Clergy
- Vicar: Revd Jennifer Hardy

St John's Church is in St John's Road, Birkdale, Southport, Merseyside, England. It is an active Anglican parish church in the deanery of North Meols, the archdeaconry of Warrington, and the diocese of Liverpool. The church is recorded in the National Heritage List for England as a designated Grade II listed building.

== History ==
St John's was built in 1889–90, and designed by the Lancaster architects Paley, Austin and Paley. The church cost £3,000 (equivalent to £330,000 in 2025), and provided seating for 318 people. It was enlarged in 1909–10 by Austin and Paley who added a north aisle with an arcade, and vestries. This cost £2,000 and added 186 seats.

== Architecture ==
=== Exterior ===
The church is constructed in brick, with dressings in glazed brick and terracotta, and some timber framing. The roofs have red tiles, and the bellcote has a spirelet clad with green Westmorland slate. The architectural style is Arts and Crafts with some Perpendicular details. The plan of the church consists of a nave with north and south aisles, a south porch, a chancel with a chapel to the south and a north vestry, and a bellcote at the west end. The aisles embrace double transepts. On the south side is a timber-framed porch with a square three-light window to its right. The transepts have a central buttress, with a tall, three-stage, two-light window on each side of it. On the west side of the transepts, and in the apexes of the gables, is timber studwork. In the south wall of the chapel is a square three-light window. The west window has six lights, and the east window, five lights; These windows are in Decorated style, with terracotta mullions, and sandstone tracery. The bellcote contains two-light windows, surmounted by a broach spire, with a metal finial.

=== Interior ===
Inside the church the brickwork is exposed, The arcades are carried on Perpendicular-style red sandstone piers without capitals springing into brick arches. The authors of the Buildings of England series consider that the stained glass in the east window is by Barrowclough and Sanders, and that elsewhere there are windows by Abbott and Company, and by Shrigley and Hunt. The three-manual organ was built in about 1893 by Rushworth and Dreaper of Liverpool.

== See also ==
- Listed buildings in Birkdale
- List of works by Paley, Austin and Paley
- List of ecclesiastical works by Austin and Paley (1895–1914)
