= Listed buildings in Birkdale =

Birkdale is a district to the south of Southport, Sefton, Merseyside, England. It contains 20 buildings that are recorded in the National Heritage List for England as designated listed buildings. Of these, one is listed at Grade II*, the middle of the three grades, and the others are at Grade II, the lowest grade.

Southport did not develop as a town and seaside resort until the late 18th century. As it grew and became more prosperous, it expanded to the south to form the district of Birkdale. Much of the layout of the district was planned, although the plans were not always followed strictly. All but three of its listed buildings date from between the middle of the 19th century and the early years of the 20th century. Two buildings pre-date this development, one of them being a surviving cob house with a cruck frame. The newest listed building, the Modernist Round House, was designed by a local cabinet maker. Most of the other listed buildings originated as large houses, five are churches (two with presbyteries), and one is a school.

== Key ==
Grade	Criteria
II*	Particularly important buildings of more than special interest
II	Buildings of national importance and special interest

== Buildings ==
Name and location	Photograph	Date	Notes	Grade
74 Liverpool Road; 53.63110°N 3.01171°W		Early to mid 17th century (probable - though elements pre-date this)	A cob house with a cruck frame and a thatched roof. It is in a single storey with a loft, and has a two-bay front containing a 20th-century porch. Most of the windows are sashes, and there are two very small square windows in the left gable.	II*
12 and 14 Sandon Road; 53.62078°N 3.01804°W	—	Early 19th century (probable)	A pair of houses, roughcast on brick, with slate roofs. They are in a single storey, and each house has a central doorway flanked by two three-light casement windows.	II
Birkdale Lodge; 53.64214°N 3.01490°W	—	c. 1850	A villa by John Aughton with Italianate and vernacular features, later divided into flats. It is stuccoed with stone dressings, some timber-framing, and slate roofs. The house is in two storeys with a four-bay front. The first and third bays are gabled, the second is a square tower containing a porch, and the fourth is a projecting gabled wing.	II
Drayton House; 53.64195°N 3.01639°W	—	c. 1850	A brick villa with stone dressings and Welsh slate roofs in two storeys. On the right of the north entrance front is a gabled wing with a two-storey bay window. To the left of this is a stone porch with an entablature and pilasters, and a cast iron and glazed portico containing a flight of steps. To the left of this and along the east front is a cast iron verandah. The windows are sashes.	II
Westcliffe Villa; 53.64253°N 3.01655°W	—	1850 (probable)	A stuccoed villa, later divided into flats, with a hipped slate roof, in Italianate style. It is in two storeys with an attic, and has a front of four bays, the left three bays being symmetrical. In the centre of these is a pilastered porch with a cast iron portico with barleysugar columns. This is flanked by bay windows. The windows are sashes.	II
2 Gloucester Road; 53.63873°N 3.01619°W	—	c. 1850–54	A stuccoed villa by John Aughton in Italianate style. It has a cruciform plan, with a projecting three-storey gabled wing flanked by two-storey wings. There is a flat-roofed porch in the left angle, and a single storey bay window in the central wing. The windows are sashes.	II
4 Gloucester Road; 53.63853°N 3.01579°W	—	c. 1850–54	A stuccoed villa by John Aughton in Italianate style. It has a cruciform plan, with a projecting three-storey gabled wing flanked by two-storey wings. There is a flat-roofed porch in the ridge angle, and a single storey bay window in the central wing. The windows are sashes.	II
3 Westcliffe Road; 53.64137°N 3.01823°W	—	c. 1850–54	A brick villa with sandstone dressings and a slate roof in Tudor Revival style. It has two storeys and three bays. The left bay protrudes forward and is gabled with a blank shield in the gable. To the right is a flat-roofed projecting porch with a Tudor arched doorway. In the right bay is a bay window. All the windows have lintel hood moulds.	II
Sunnymede School; 53.64295°N 3.01756°W	—	c. 1850–60 (probable)	Originally a villa, and later used as a school, it in Italianate style. The building is stuccoed with stone dressings, and has slate roofs at differing levels. It is in two storeys, with a northeast tower of three storeys. The tower has a pyramidal roof with a finial. The windows are sashes.	II
St James' Church; 53.63834°N 3.01949°W		1856–57	The church was designed by A. Rimmer in the style of about 1300, and was enlarged later by J. F. Doyle. It is in sandstone with slate roofs. The church consists of a nave with north and south porches, gabled wings, north and south transepts with twin gables, a large chancel and a west tower with a short broach spire. On the roof are three gabled dormers.	II
Roach Villas; 53.63847°N 3.01109°W	—	c. 1858	A brick house with sandstone dressings and a slate roof in Regency style. It has two storeys and one gabled bay facing the street. The windows are mullioned casements with hood moulds, the ground floor window also having transoms. On the right side is a lean-to porch.	II
Titus Cottage; 53.63853°N 3.01115°W	—	c. 1858	A house, rendered on brick with sandstone dressings and a slate roof in Regency style. It has two storeys and a symmetrical three-bay front, with an extension at the rear giving it an L-shaped plan. The central bay projects slightly forward and is gabled. It contains a gabled porch with a two-light lancet window above. The other windows are casements with hood moulds.	II
St Joseph's Church; 53.63604°N 3.01530°W		1865–67	A Roman Catholic church by E. W. Pugin, extended in 1875. It is in red brick with blue brick banding, sandstone dressings and a slate roof in Early English style. It consists of a nave, a south aisle, a chancel, and a west narthex. At the west end is a bellcote.	II
Presbytery, St Joseph's Church; 53.63586°N 3.01538°W	—	c. 1865–67	The presbytery is in red brick with blue brick banding and has a hipped slate roof. It has a rectangular plan with a bay containing a porch to the right, and is in two storeys. On the front facing the road is a bay window. The windows are sashes.	II
Principal Block, Kingswood School; 53.64038°N 3.02033°W	—	1866	Originating as a villa named St Wyburn, it was used as a school from 1938. The building is in brick with sandstone dressings, a hipped slate roof, and is in Italianate style. It is in two storeys with a symmetrical five-bay front. The outer and centre bays project forward, and the centre bays is gabled. In the centre is a Doric porch with four columns, a triglyph frieze and a cornice. The bays are flanked by rusticated quoins, and the windows are sashes.	II
St Peter's Church; 53.63206°N 3.00990°W		1870–71	Designed by T. D. Barry and Sons, the porch tower was added in 1886–87, and the transepts were added and the chancel rebuilt in 1907. The church is built in sandstone with slate roofs, and is broadly in Decorated style. It consists of a nave with a clerestory, aisles, transepts, a chancel with north and south vestries, and a porch tower on the south side. The tower has angle buttresses, a northwest stair tower, and a pierced parapet with corner gargoyles and crocketed pinnacles.	II
St John's Church; 53.62276°N 3.01380°W		1889–90	The church was designed by Paley, Austin and Paley, and was enlarged by the same practice in 1909–10. It is in brick with dressings in glazed brick and terracotta, some timber framing, tiled roofs, and a spirelet clad with green Westmorland slate. The church is in Arts and Crafts style with some Perpendicular details, and it consists of a nave with aisles embracing transepts, a south porch, and a chancel with a chapel to the south and a north vestry.	II
St Teresa's Church and presbytery 53.63410°N 3.00730°W		1897–98	A Roman Catholic church by Sinnott, Sinnott and Powell in Early English style. It is built in red brick with dressings in red sandstone and buff terracotta and roofs of slate. The church has a cruciform plan, with a narrow nave opening out into aisles, each with a transept, and a chancel. There is a flèche over the crossing. The presbytery is to the north and is joined to the nave by a cloister; it is in two storeys with an attic, and has a pyramidal roof.	II
Terra Nova School; 53.63208°N 3.03083°W	—	1901	A boys' boarding school by Edward Shelbourne, extended by him in 1908. It has since been used as a school for deaf children but closed in 2003. The building is in red brick with red tiled roofs and some weatherboarding. It is in 2 1/2 storeys and ten bays, with short wings at each end. Its features include a short tower with a clock face and an embattled parapet, bay windows, and oriel windows. Most of the windows are sashes.	II
The Round House; 53.62652°N 3.02757°W		1924–25	Designed by Luke Highton for his own use in International Modern style, the house is in rendered brick. It was remodelled internally, and a porch was added, in 1962. The house has a circular plan, it is in 2 1/2 storeys with a basement, and has an observatory on the roof. At the top of the house is a plain parapet incorporating an attic with a shaped gable.	II
