= St. Vincent de Paul Catholic Church (Los Angeles) =

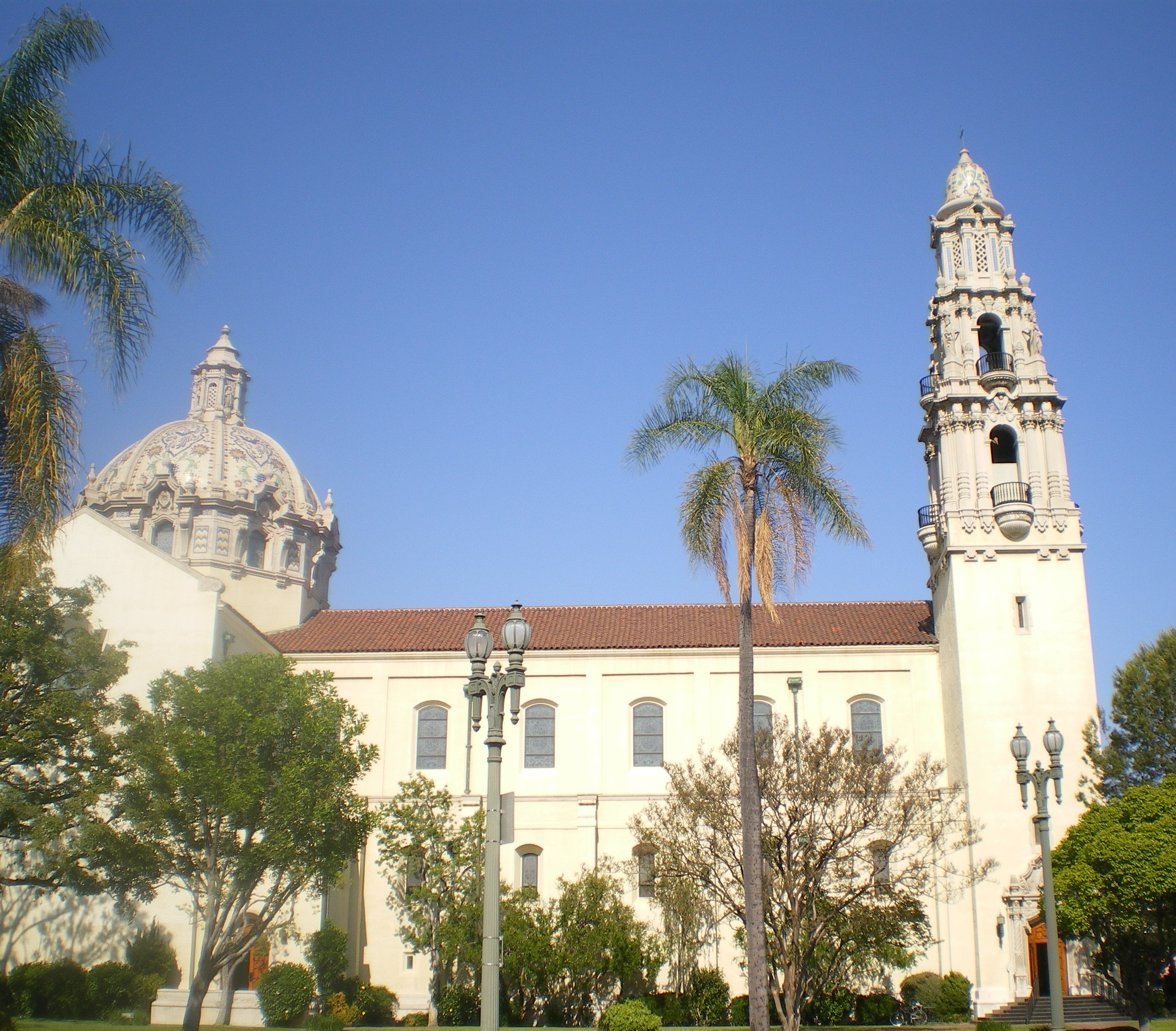
- St. Vincent Catholic Church

- Location within the Los Angeles metropolitan area
- 34°01′44″N 118°16′35″W
- Location: 621 W. Adams Boulevard, South Los Angeles, Los Angeles, California 90007

History
- Built: 1925

Site notes
- Architect(s): Albert C. Martin, Sr.
- Architectural style: California Churrigueresque
- Governing body: Archdiocese of Los Angeles

Los Angeles Historic-Cultural Monument
- Designated: July 11, 1971
- Reference no.: 90

St. Vincent de Paul Catholic Church (Spanish: Iglesia de San Vicente de Paul) is a Catholic parish and Los Angeles Historic-Cultural Monument (No. 90) in the South Los Angeles section of Los Angeles, California. It is operated by the Vincentians.

== History ==
The church was built in the 1920s and designed by architect Albert C. Martin, Sr.; the interior was designed by Samuel Lunden working for Cram and Ferguson. The Vincentians have operated the parish throughout its history.

Paid for by local oilman Edward L. Doheny and thus is known colloquially as "the Church of Holy Oils." It was dedicated in 1925, it was located in what was then one of the wealthiest sections of the city, on land adjacent to the Stephen Dorsey mansion and Stimson House. It was the second Catholic church in Los Angeles to be consecrated.

Composer Amédée Tremblay notably served as the church's organist from 1925–1949. Tremblay was succeeded as organist by the British-born musician John Lee.

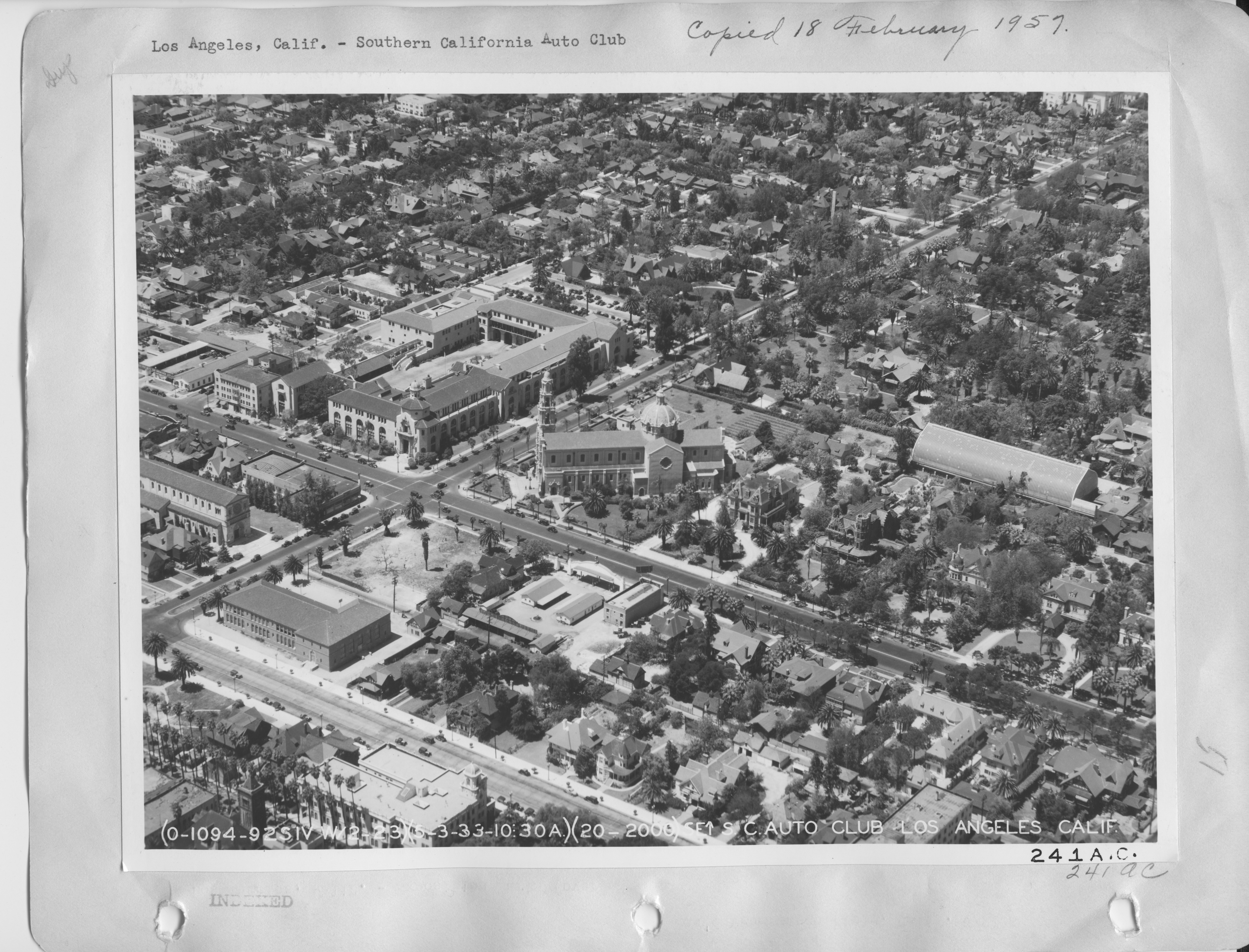
St. Vincent de Paul Church sometime before 1957

== In popular culture ==
The climactic scene of the 1999 film End of Days, featuring Arnold Schwarzenegger's battle against Satan, was filmed in the church. The church's altar is featured prominently in the film's final scenes. The church also appears in the movie Constantine.

The church was featured in the Warrant music video for "The Bitter Pill" (acoustic version), with lead singer Jani Lane performing the song in front of and around the church. The church was also featured in the Charmed episode "When Bad Warlocks Turn Good". Furthermore the church is visible in the Madonna's music video of "God Control", and some parts of it in her video of "Dark Ballet".

== Gallery ==
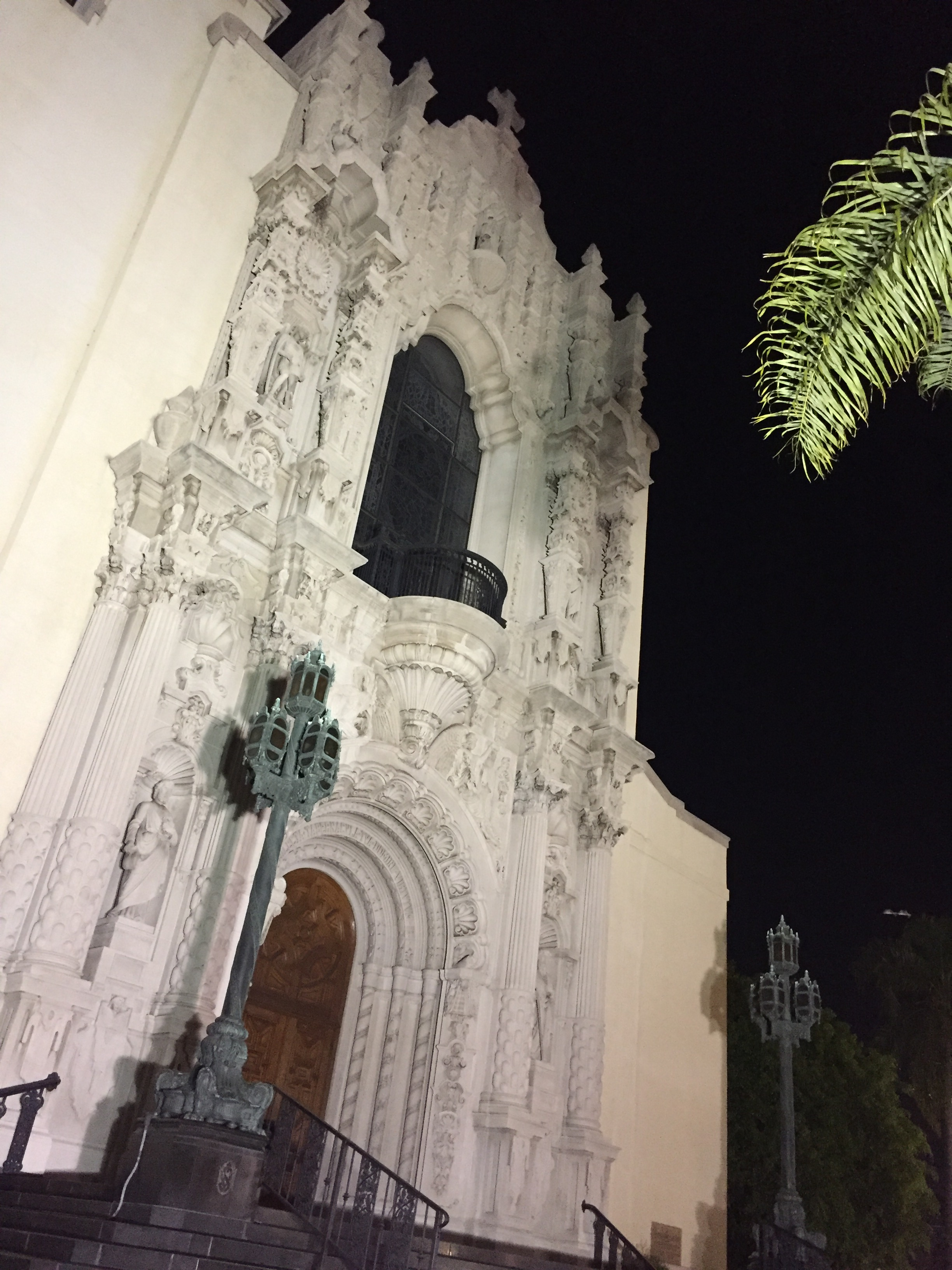
The front of St. Vincent's.

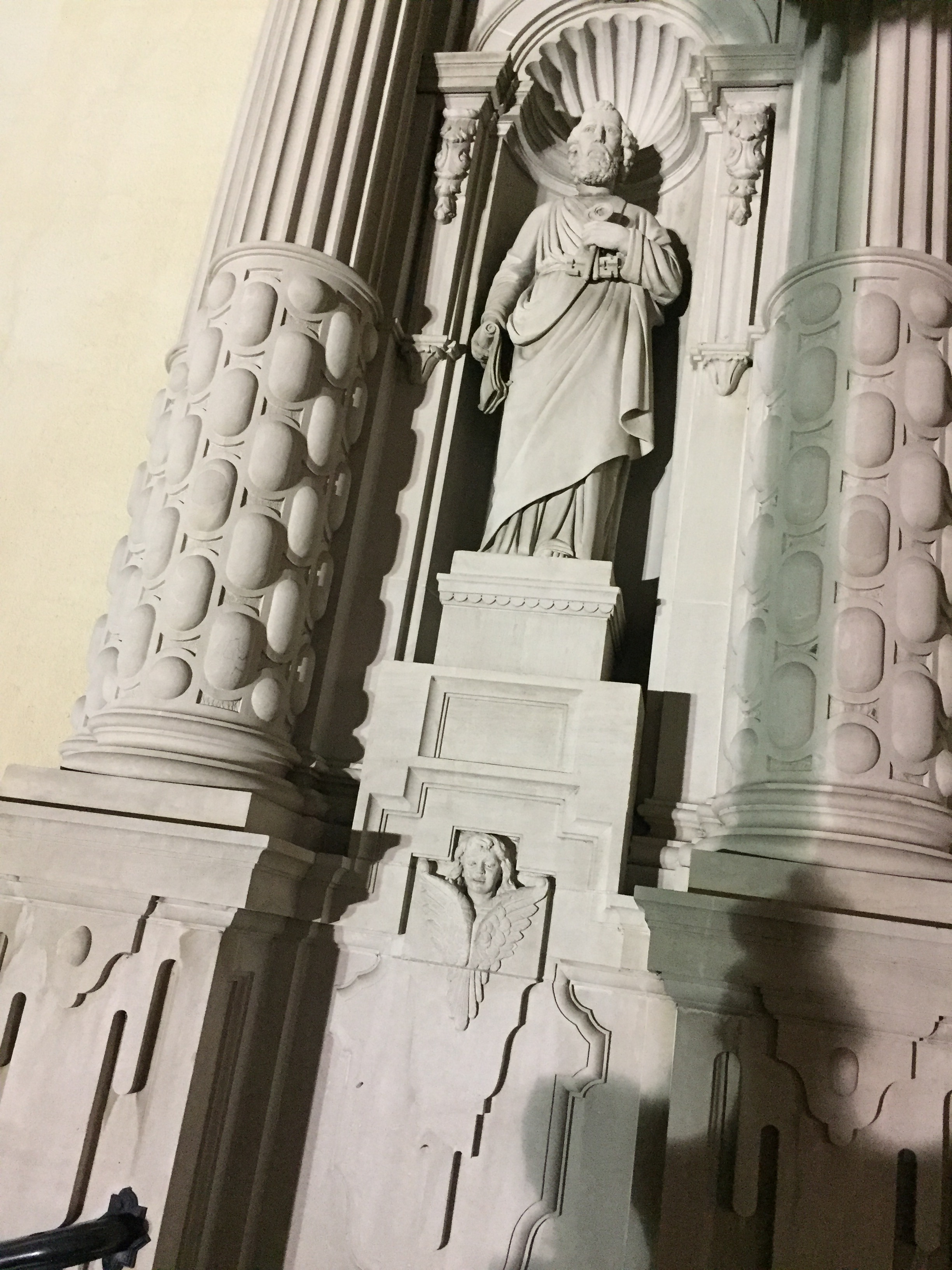
Statuary at the cathedral.

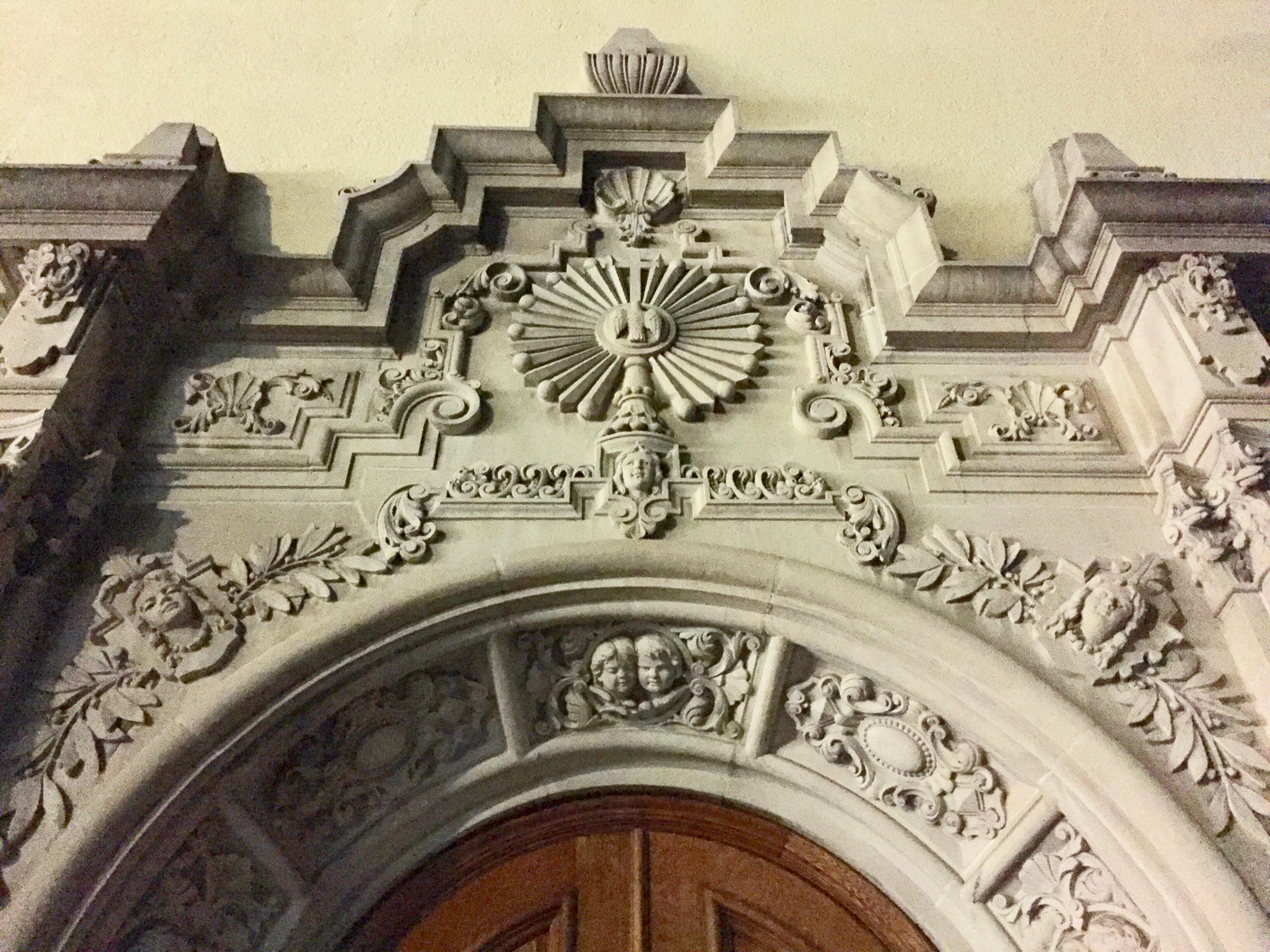
Stonework embellishment above a doorway.

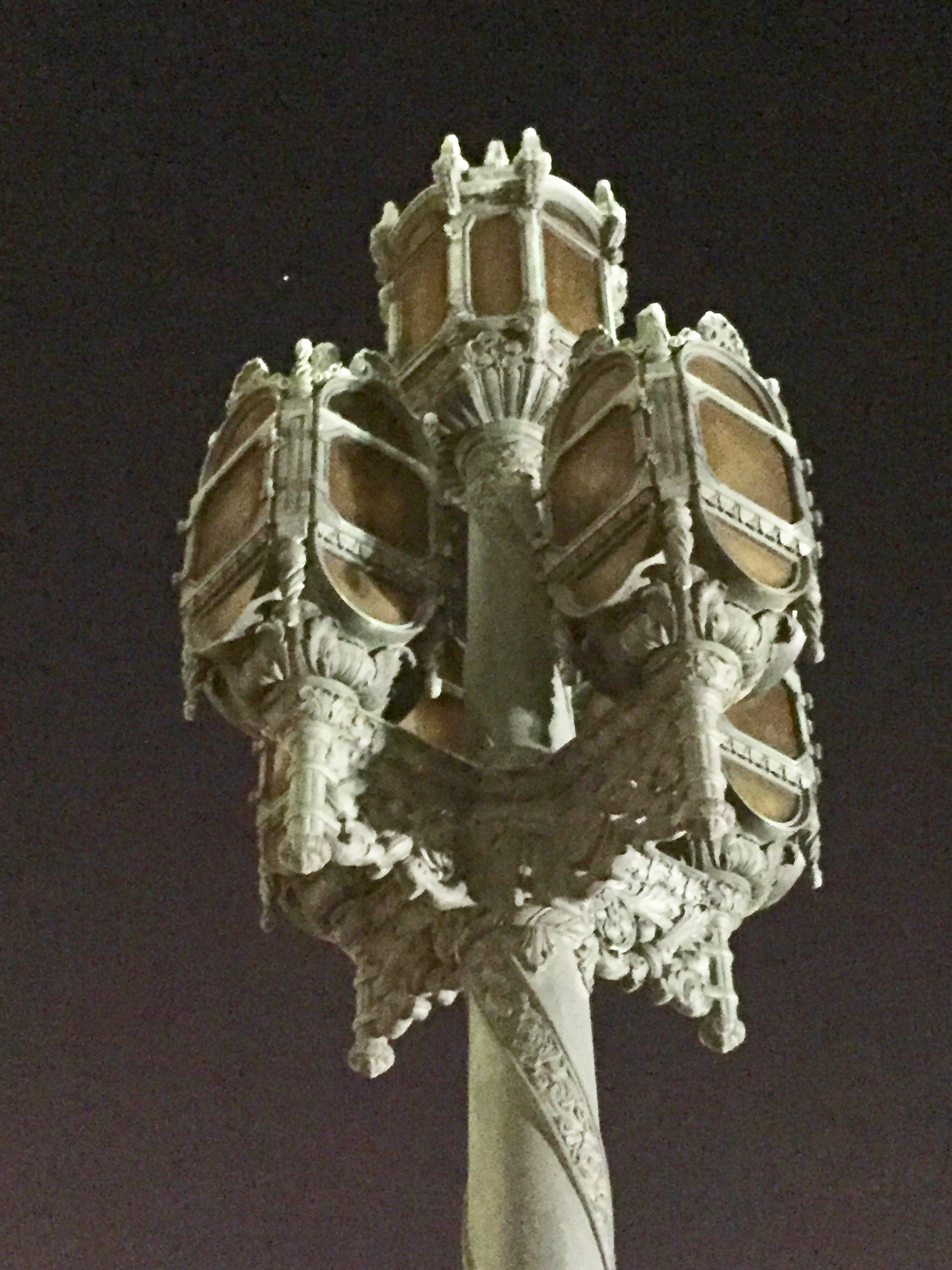
A lamp at St. Vincent's.

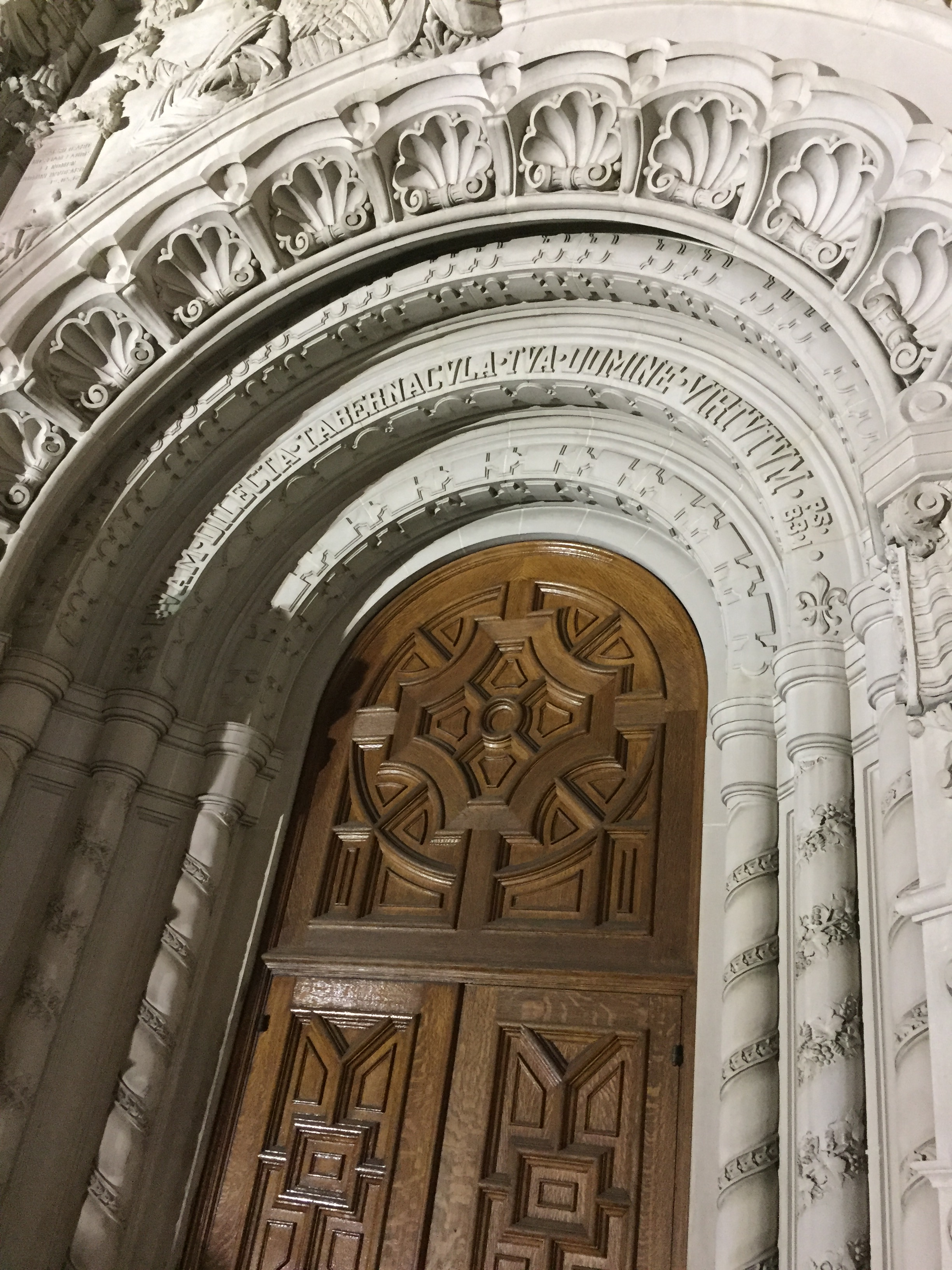
Ornate doorway at St. Vincent's.

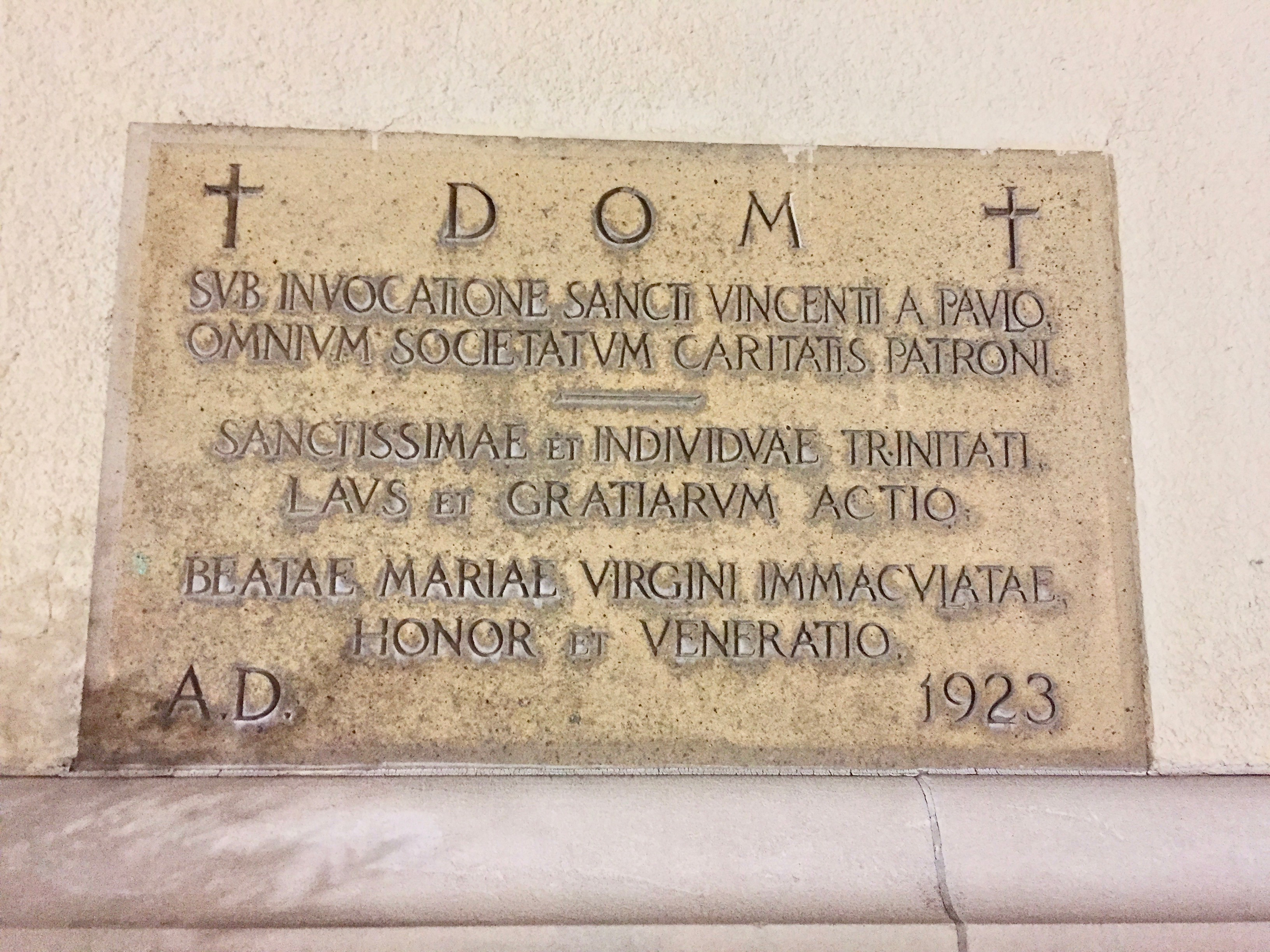
St. Vincent cornerstone.

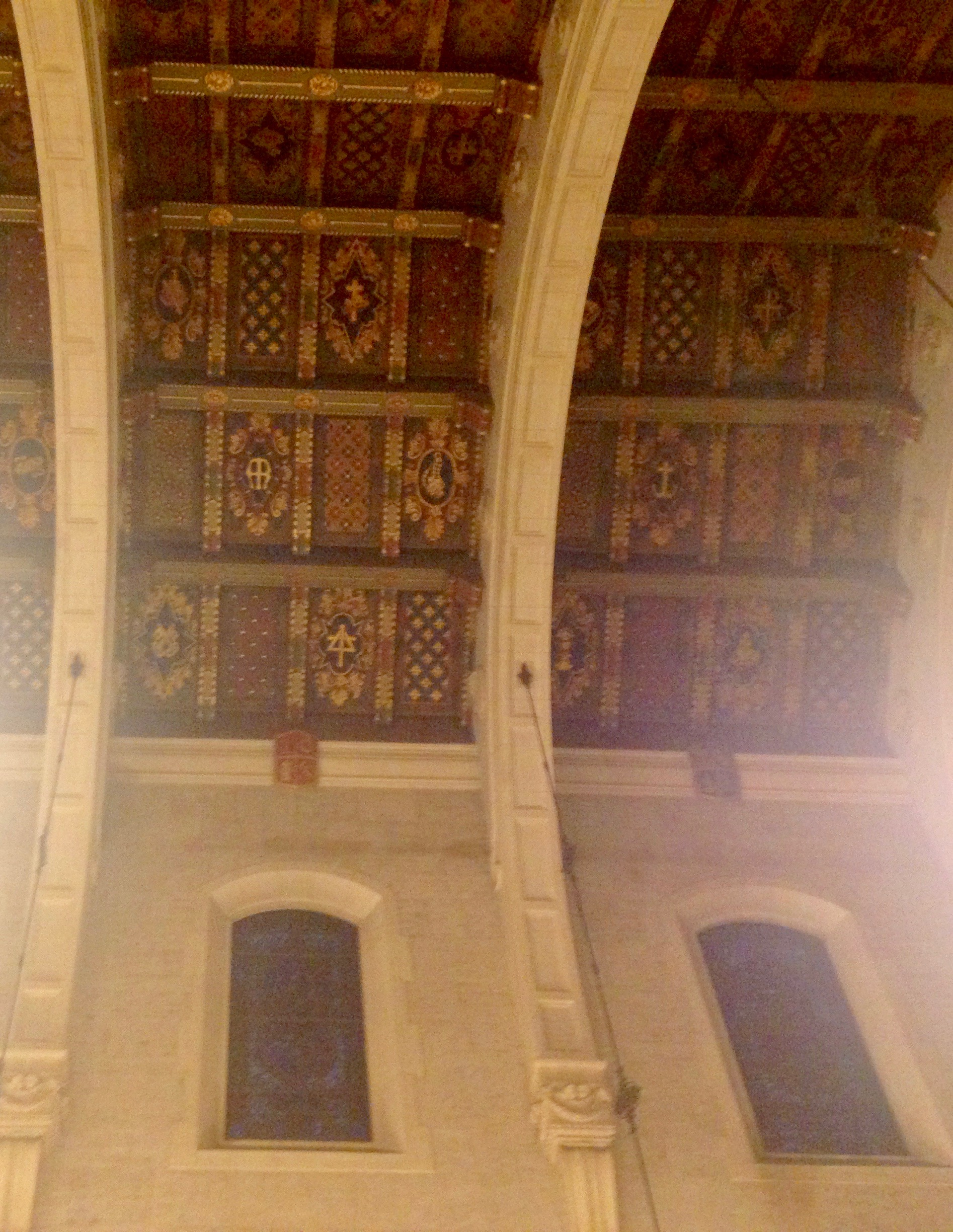
Handpainted ceiling.

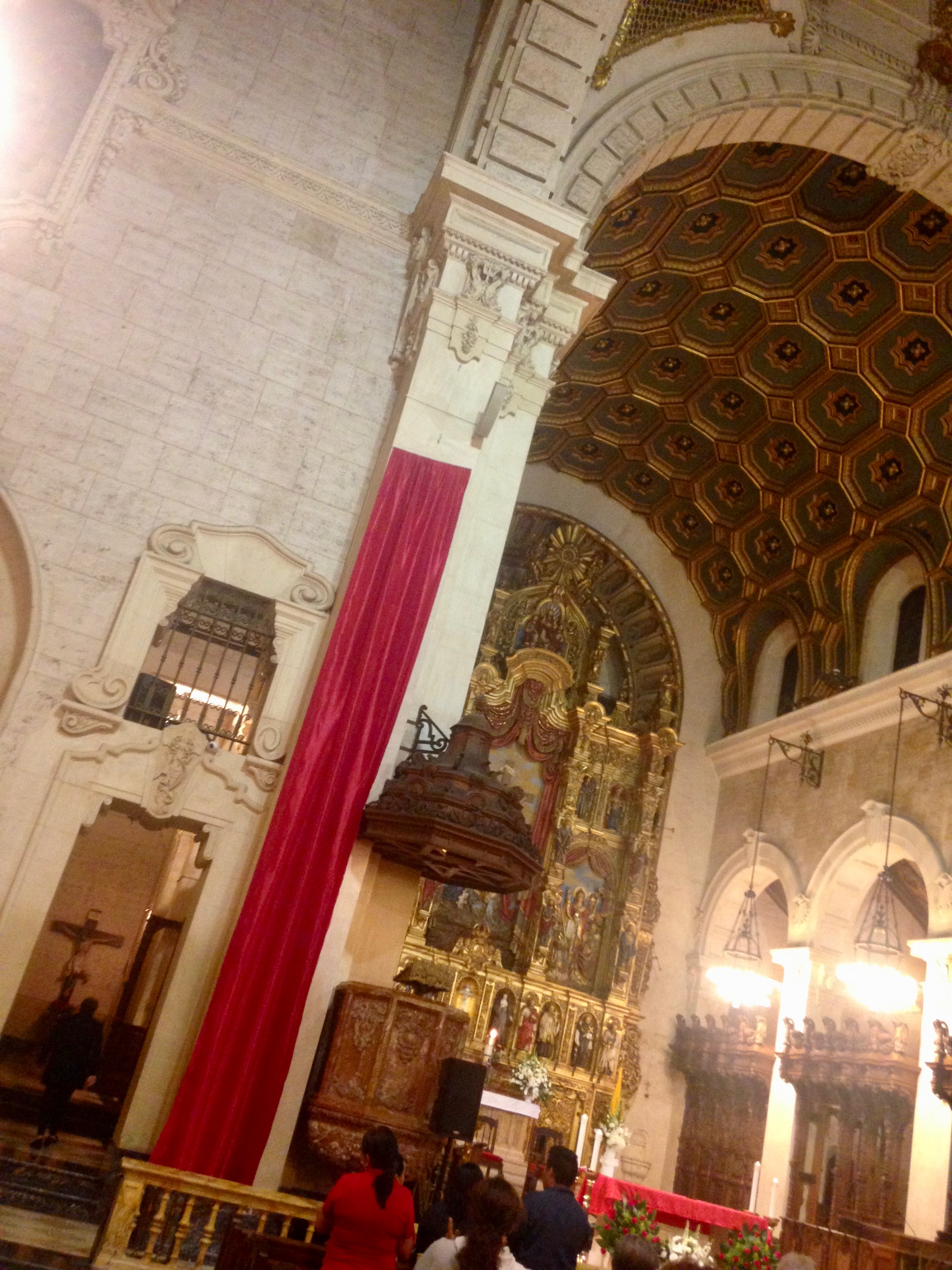
A look inside St. Vincent's

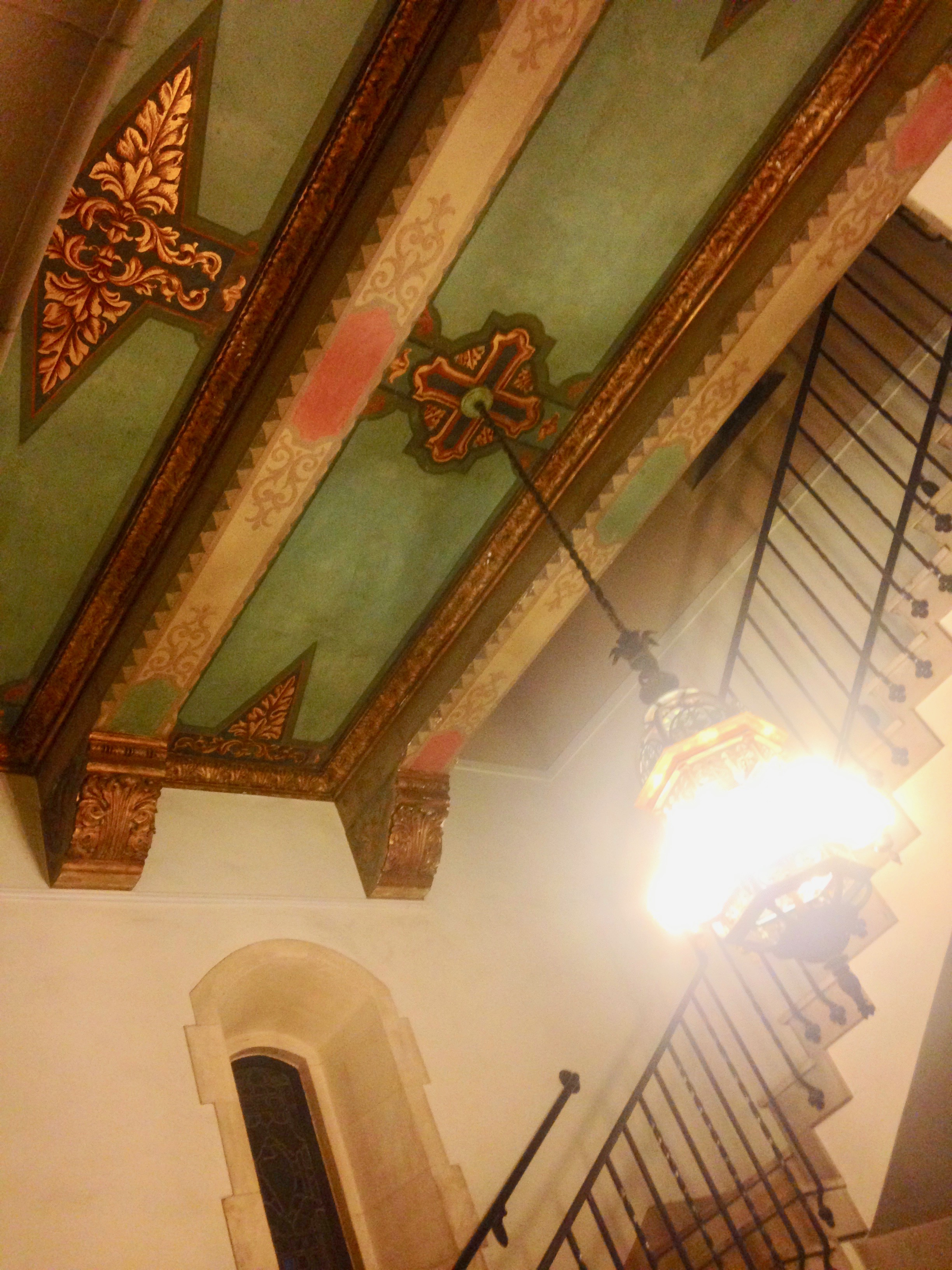
Another handpainted ceiling.

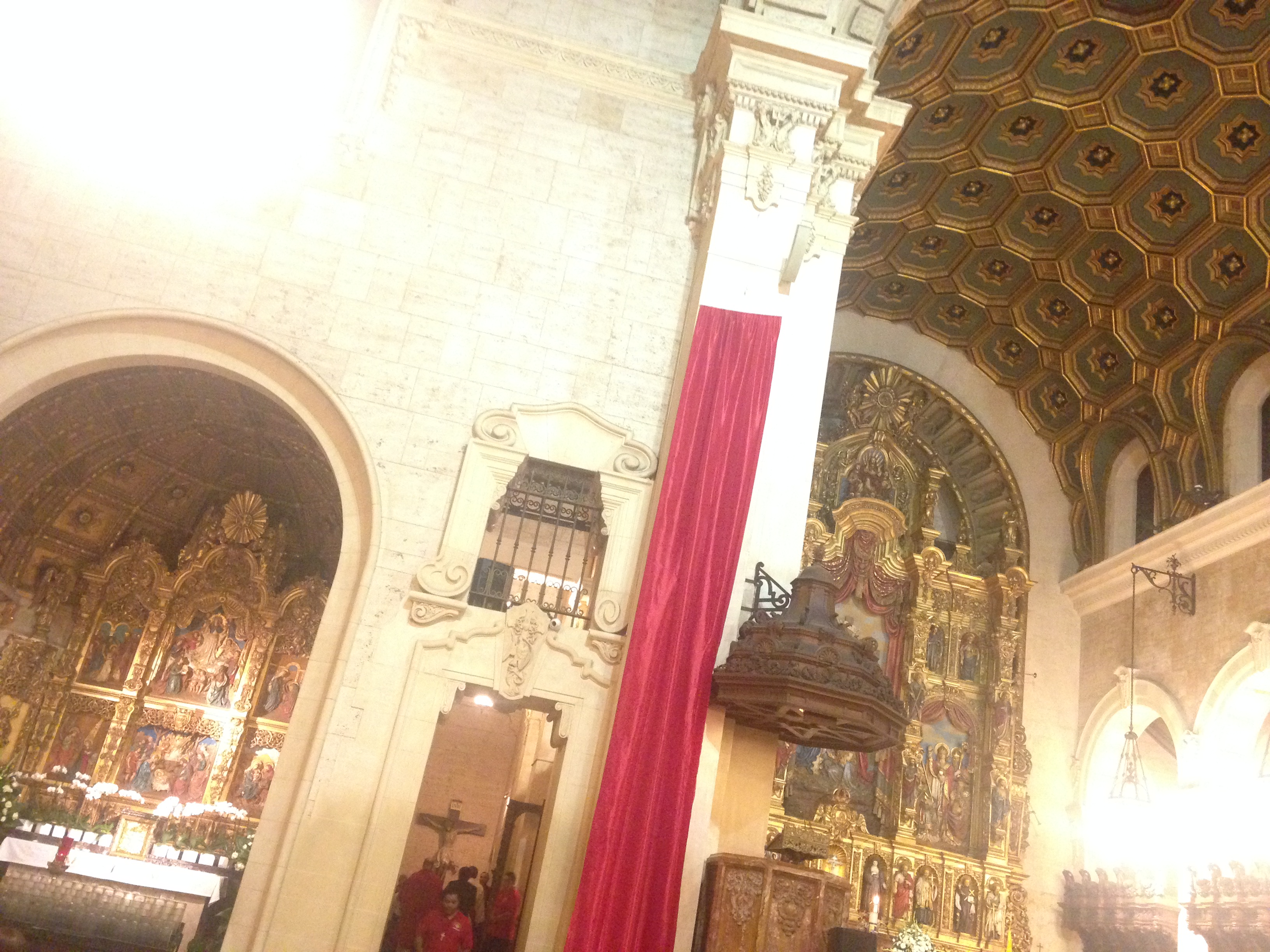
Another look inside St. Vincent's.

== See also ==
- List of Los Angeles Historic-Cultural Monuments in South Los Angeles
