= Greenbank High School =

Location
- Hastings Road; Hillside, Southport, Merseyside, PR8 2LT; England; 53.622°N 3.028°W

Information
- Type: Secondary Academy
- Established: 1 November 2011
- Department for Education URN: 137604 Tables
- Ofsted: Reports
- Headteacher: Davina Aspinall
- Gender: Girls
- Age: 11 to 16
- Enrolment: 1009
- Colours: Green and Silver
- Former name: High School for Girls
- Website: http://www.greenbankhigh.co.uk

Greenbank High School is an all-girls secondary academy school located in Hillside, Southport, Merseyside, England.

== School details ==
Greenbank currently holds The NACE (National Able Children in Education) Challenge Award, Artsmark Gold, British Council International Schools Award, Association of PE and Sport Quality Mark at the highest level, Secondary Geography Quality Mark and Trinity College Arts Award Champion Status.

It is situated on the west side of the A565, east of the Royal Birkdale Golf Club and next to Hillside railway station.

== History ==
=== Grammar school ===
It was known as High School for Girls, a grammar school, administered by the County Borough of Southport. It had around 650 girls in the early 1960s, 800 by the late 1960s, and 850 in the 1970s. It had moved into new buildings in 1958.

=== Comprehensive ===
It became a girls' comprehensive for ages 11–16 in 1978, with the last sixth form leaving in 1980.

Greenbank was the first Specialist school to be designated in Sefton, and one of the earliest schools in the UK to be designated with a specialism in Modern Foreign Languages. Today it teaches (French and Spanish) to all KS3 pupils, and all pupils study at least one language to GCSE level. Latin is also taught as an optional extra-curricular subject.

=== Academy ===
On 1 November 2011, Greenbank High School formally gained academy status.

It is the academy sponsor for Stanley High School, Southport.

== Academic performance ==
2019 results Greenbank High School achieved a Progress 8 score of 0.32 which is in the above average category for the DFE and the highest in Sefton. Greenbank High School is the highest ranked school in Sefton in The Real Schools Guide for 2020.

== Notable former pupils and staff ==
=== Former pupils ===
- Holly Fletcher, Låpsley, singer
- Miranda Richardson, actress
- Holly Minto, lead singer of the band Crawlers

=== Staff ===
- Tina Cullen MBE, England International hockey player
