= John Lee (composer of church music) =

John Lee (29 April 1908, Southport – 8 April 1990, Los Angeles) was a British-born Catholic musician who spent most of his career in north America. He is best remembered for his pioneering English-language musical settings of the Catholic Church's liturgies that came into use following the Second Vatican Council (1962–65).

== Life ==
John was the third child of John Lee (a house painter by trade) and his wife Mary Anne (nee Hartnett) living at 17 Clifton Road Southport, Lancashire.

Nothing has come to light of John Lee's early life and musical education, except that he studied at Oxford University and was the organist of St Joseph's Church, Birkdale, UK.

John Lee married Mary Lyons (born 29/09/1916) on 20 August 1942 in Crosby. On 23 May 1943 a son Peter John was born. On 23 July 1946 a son David Michael was born.

The Lee family emigrated to Canada where John held a teaching position at St. Francis Xavier University, Antigonish, Nova Scotia, Canada. Here a daughter Judith Mary was born on 11 May 1947.

From Canada the family moved to the United States arriving from Nova Scotia at Port Huron, Michigan on 16 September 1949. They settled in Los Angeles, where on 7 May 1950 a son Christopher Luke was born.

John Lee and his family took US citizenship in 1955 while living in Los Angeles at 22 Chester Place. a prosperous area of the city. In Los Angeles John Lee held the position of organist at the city's church of St Vincent de Paul.

John Lee is buried in the cemetery of St Andrew's Abbey, Valyermo.

== Works ==
=== For choir ===
==== Arrangements ====
- 1966. Eight Offertory Motets by G.P. da Palestrina, G. Carissimi, C. Tye et al.
- 1967. Two Motets in Honor of the Blessed Virgin by Francesco Soriano and Antonio Lotti.

==== Hymn tunes ====
- 1964. O saving Victim op'ning wide.
- 1970. Dying you destroyed our death..
- 1970. Glory to God in the highest.
- 1970. Lord, by your cross and resurrection.
- 1970. When we eat this bread, when we drink this cup.

==== Original works ====
- 1955. Adoro te devote. For S.A. or S.A.T.B.
- 1960. Mass in Honor of Our Lady - Help of Christians. For S.A.T.B.
- 1964. Choral mass in English.
- 1964. Second Mass in English, for congregations and alternating choir ad lib.
- 1965. Mass for the Dead and the Burial Service. For unison, two or three equal voices with optional organ.
- 1966. Mass in Honor of Saint Joseph. For S.A.T.B. voices and congregation ad lib.
- 1966. Yours are the Heavens. Offertory for the third mass of Christmas for S.A.T.B. and organ.
- 1970. Choral mass. S.A.T.B. and organ with congregation ad libitum. (1970 text).
- 1970. Nine motets. S.A.T.B. and organ.
- 1972. Festival mass. (1972 text).
- 1973. Jubilee mass. S.A.T.B. and organ.
- 1974. Fourteen plainsong hymns in Latin and English. Unison voices and organ.
- 1975. Jubilate Deo. Plainsong hymns.
- 1980. Two plainsong Gloria settings with handbells.

=== For organ ===
- 1924. Suite for low mass.
- 1939. Preludes for Liturgical Service.
- 1951. Improvisations.
- 1951. Meditations.
- 1952. Invocation.
- 1955. Postludes.
- 1960. Dialogue.
