= Birkdale High School, Southport =

Academy in Southport, Merseyside, UK

Birkdale High School

Location
- Windy Harbour Road; Southport, Merseyside, PR8 3DT; United Kingdom
- Coordinates: 53.612357°N 3.024051°W

Information
- Type: Academy
- Motto: Nihil Nisi Bonum (Only the best will do)
- Religious affiliation: N/A
- Local authority: Sefton
- Specialist: Mathematics and Computing
- Department for Education URN: 137297 Tables
- Ofsted: Reports
- Headmaster: Gareth Banks
- Staff: 53
- Gender: Boys
- Age: 11 to 16
- Enrolment: 908
- Houses: Constantine, Turing and Hawking Houses
- Colours: Navy Blue, blue and white
- Website: http://www.birkdalehigh.co.uk/

Birkdale High School is an all-boys secondary school with academy status situated in Southport in North West England. Located close to neighbouring schools Christ the King and Greenbank High School (the equivalent girls' school), Birkdale was originally a co-educational school known as Birkdale Secondary Modern School. The school does not have a sixth form and only takes boys from ages 11–16.

== Notable former pupils ==
- Jack Bainbridge, footballer for Southport
- Matthew Baldwin, professional golfer
- Jake Bidwell, footballer for Coventry City
- Delial Brewster, former professional footballer
- Mathew Hudson, footballer for Preston North End
- Kyle Joseph, footballer for Swansea City
- Mikey O'Neill, footballer for Preston North End
- Jack Rodwell, footballer for Western Sydney Wanderers

== Ofsted ==
Birkdale was judged by Ofsted in 2006 as Good.

In 2011 the school was judged Inadequate and placed into Special Measures.

In 2013 Ofsted carried out a full inspection and gave the school a Good rating.

== Notable Incidents ==
In 2010, a former teaching assistant was charged with having sex with 2 16-year-old students whom she invited into her house in Hightown, in Merseyside and had Intercourse with. She got a 16 Month prison sentence. Also a Former Headteacher was charged with historical sex offences in 2017.
