= Birkdale Village =

Urban community in Huntersville, North Carolina, United States

Coordinates: 35.4466°N 80.8799°W

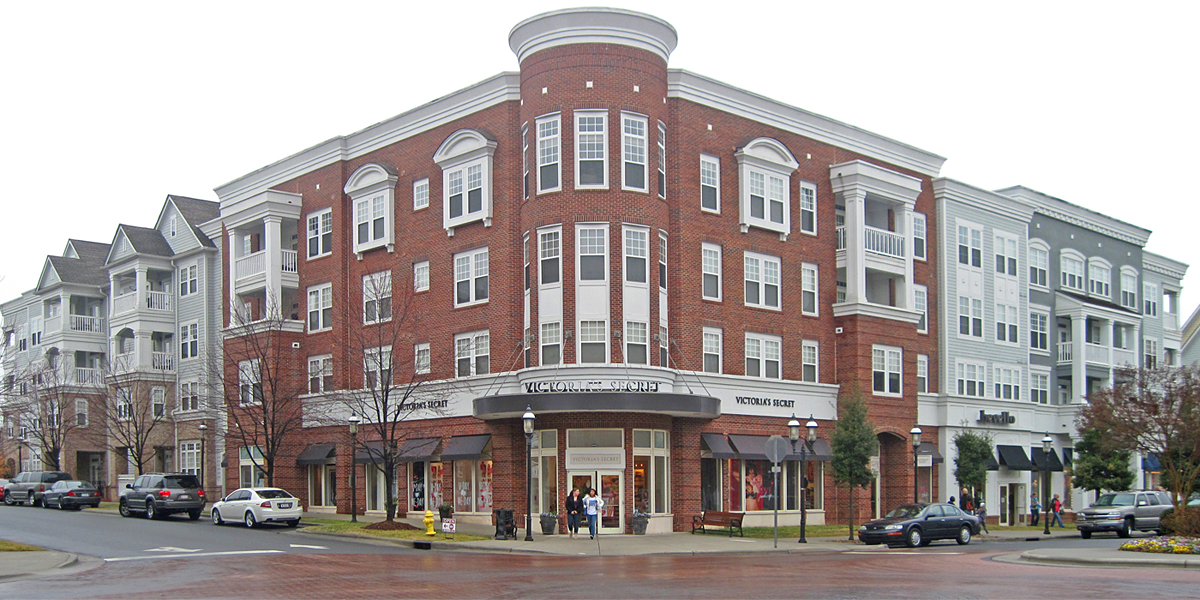
Birkdale Village Town Center

Birkdale Village is an urban mixed-use community in Huntersville, North Carolina, United States, 12 miles (19 km) north of Charlotte, North Carolina. It was named after the English village of Birkdale, in Southport. It has numerous restaurants and stores. Apartments are located at the property provided by Haven at Birkdale Village. A gym, a movie theater, a supermarket, a golf course, a greenway, an express bus park and ride, and the 32,510-acre (131.6 km^{2}) Lake Norman are all within walking distance for the residents of Birkdale Village.

== Design & development ==
Birkdale Village is an 52-acre (210,000 m^{2}) urbanist residential, retail and office mixed-use community located in Huntersville, North Carolina.
