= HIL =

HIL or hil may refer to:

- Hil, Azerbaijan, a village
- HIL bus, a computer bus
- Hil Hernández (born 1984), Chilean beauty pageant winner
- Eduard Hil (1934–2012), Russian singer
- Hardware-in-the-loop simulation
- Human in the loop
- Hiligaynon language, ISO 639 code for a language spoken in the Philippines
- Hill International, an American international construction consulting firm
- Hillside railway station, England; National Rail station code HIL.
- Hindustan Insecticides, an Indian chemical company
- Hockey India League
- Lillehammer University College (Norwegian: Høgskolen i Lillehammer)
- Shilavo Airport, in Ethiopia

== See also ==
- Hill (disambiguation)
