= St Peter's Church, Birkdale =

St Peter's Church
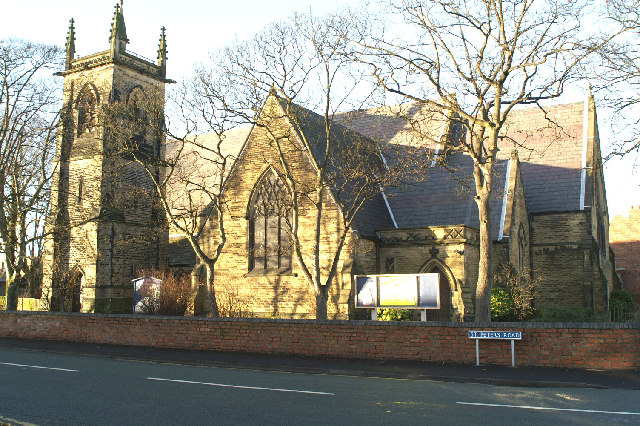
- St Peter's Church

- Location in Southport
- 53.6321°N 3.0099°W
- OS grid reference: SD 333 155
- Location: St Peter's Road, Birkdale, Southport, Sefton, Merseyside
- Country: England
- Denomination: Anglican
- Website: stjamesandstpetersbirkdale.co.uk/st-peters-church

History
- Status: Parish church

Architecture
- Functional status: Active
- Heritage designation: Grade II
- Architect(s): T. D. Barry and Sons
- Architectural type: Church
- Style: Gothic Revival (Decorated)
- Groundbreaking: 1870
- Completed: 1907

Specifications
- Materials: Sandstone, slate roofs

Administration
- Province: York
- Diocese: Liverpool
- Archdeaconry: Warrington
- Deanery: North Meols
- Parish: St Peter, Birkdale

Clergy
- Vicar: Position Vacant (As of mid 2026)

St Peter's Church is in St Peter's Road, Birkdale, Southport, Sefton, Merseyside, England, and is an active Anglican parish church in the diocese of Liverpool. Its building started in 1870, and additions were made in 1886–87 and in 1907. The church is in Gothic Revival style, and it is recorded in the National Heritage List for England as a designated Grade II listed building.

== History ==
St Peter's Church was designed by T. D. Barry and Sons, and was built in 1870–71. In 1886–87 a porch tower was added, and in 1907 the transepts were added and the chancel was rebuilt.

== Architecture ==
=== Exterior ===
The church is constructed in coursed sandstone rubble, and it has slate roofs in red and purple bands. The church's architectural style is Decorated, and it consists of a nave with a clerestory, north and south aisles, north and south transepts, a chancel with north and south vestries, and a tower in front of the south aisle. The tower is in three stages with angle buttresses and a northwest stair turret. In the bottom stage is an arched south doorway leading to a porch. The middle stage contains lancet windows, and in the top stage are two-light louvred bell openings. At the summit of the tower is a pierced parapet with corner gargoyles and crocketed pinnacles. The windows in the aisles have two lights, and those in the transepts have three. Along the clerestory are pointed quatrefoils. Both the west and east windows are large and contain elaborate tracery; the west window has four lights, and the east window has five.

=== Interior ===
Inside the church the six-bay arcades are carried on piers of polished granite, and have capitals carved with foliage. The reredos and altar are dated 1908 and are decorated with painted angels on a gold ground and are in traceried frames. There are also paintings of angels on the east wall, and carved choir furnishings with an integral organ case. The stained glass includes a First World War memorial at the west end containing a depiction of Saint George. In the south aisle is a window from the late 19th century by Reuben Bennett.

== Appraisal ==
The church was designated as a Grade II listed building on 29 July 1999. Grade II is the lowest of the three grades of listing and is applied to buildings that are "nationally important and of special interest".

== Present day ==
St Peter's is an active Anglican church in the deanery of North Meols, the archdeaconry of Warrington, and the diocese of Liverpool. The church arranges services on Sundays and during the week, and hosts various group activities in the parish centre.

== See also ==
- Listed buildings in Birkdale
