= St Joseph's Church, Birkdale =

Coordinates: 53.6360°N 3.0153°W

St Joseph's Church
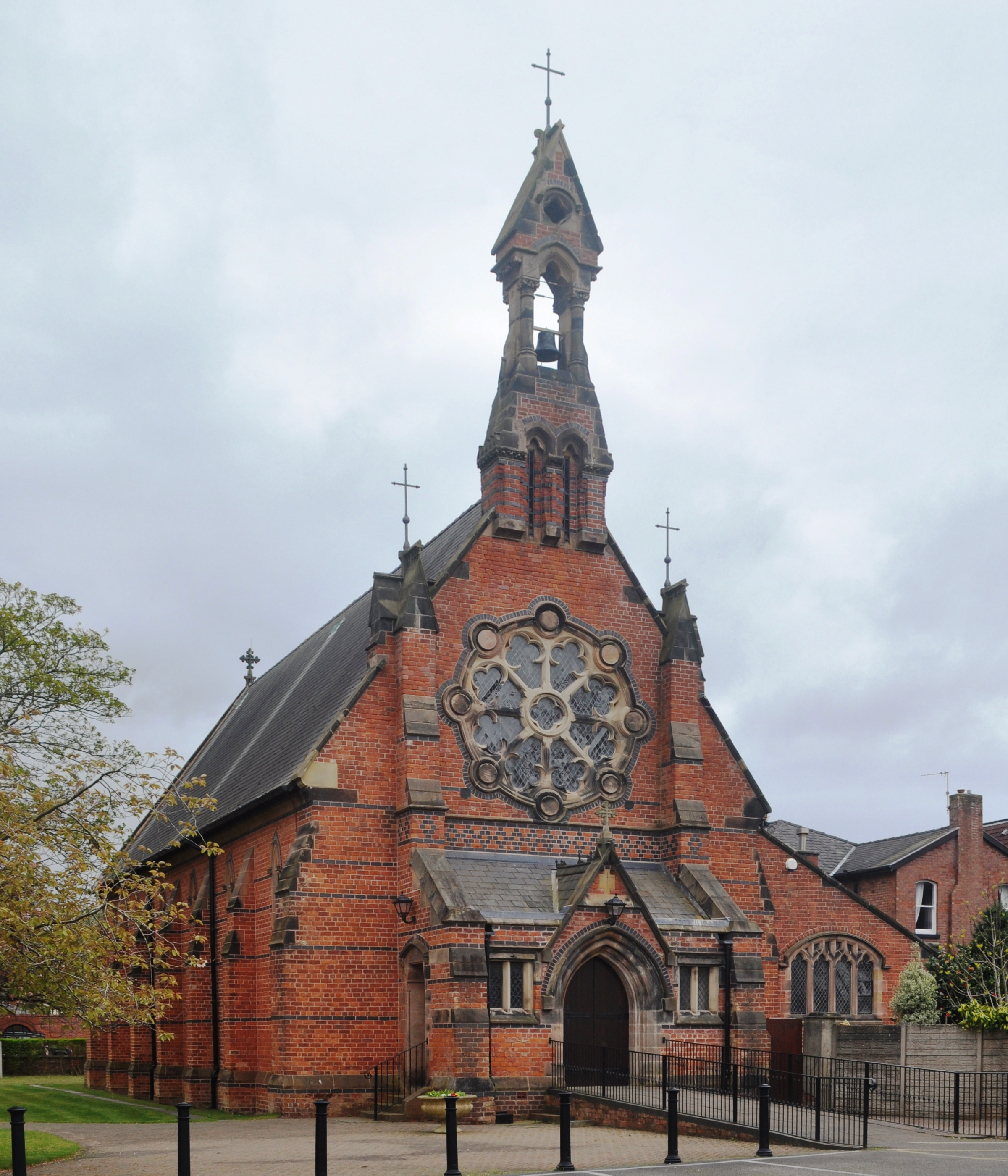
- St Joseph's Church in 2024

- Location in Southport
- OS grid reference: SD 330 160
- Location: York Road, Birkdale, Southport, Sefton, Merseyside
- Country: England
- Denomination: Roman Catholic
- Website: St Joseph, Birkdale

Architecture
- Functional status: Active
- Heritage designation: Grade II
- Designated: 29 June 1999
- Architect: E. W. Pugin
- Architectural type: Church
- Style: Gothic Revival
- Groundbreaking: 1865
- Completed: 1875

Specifications
- Materials: Brick with sandstone dressings, slate roof

Administration
- Diocese: Lancaster

Clergy
- Priest: Fr Atli Jonsson

St Joseph's Church is in York Road, Birkdale, Southport, Sefton, Merseyside, England, and is an active Roman Catholic church in the diocese of Liverpool. It was designed by E. W. Pugin, and built in 1865–67 with an aisle added in 1875. The church is recorded in the National Heritage List for England as a designated Grade II listed building.

== History ==
St Joseph's was built in 1865–67 and designed by E. W. Pugin. The south aisle was added in 1875.

== Architecture ==
=== Exterior ===
The church is constructed in red brick with blue brick bands, sandstone dressings, and a slate roof. The original building was in Early English style, and the south aisle is Perpendicular. The plan of the church consists of a six-bay nave, a south aisle, a chancel, and a west narthex. On the west gable is a bellcote surmounted by a finial. Along the sides of the church the bays are separated by buttresses. On the north side each bay contains a narrow lancet window, and along the south aisle the windows are Perpendicular. At the west end, the narthex has a lean-to roof, and contains a gabled doorway approached by three steps and flanked by two rectangular windows. Above the narthex is a large rose window. The chancel also has a large east rose window, and there are three lancet windows on each side. Around the chancel is a chequered frieze.

=== Interior ===
Inside the church the arcade between the nave and the aisle is carried on octagonal sandstone piers. The chancel arch has detached demi-shafts with foliated caps and it springs from corbels carved with angels.

At the east end is a plain reredos with a cornice and a traceried canopy. Hanging from the chancel arch is a painted rood. Above the east window is a semicircular arch, also springing from shafts with foliated caps. The only stained glass is in the east window, it dates from the mid to late 19th century, and is probably by Hardman.

At the east end of the aisle is an elaborately carved altar, and a reredos incorporating shafts of coloured stone, a central carved stone canopy, and an icon of the Virgin and Child.

At the west end is a pitch pine gallery, and the organ pipes frame the west window. The two-manual pipe organ was built in 1875 by Ainscough of Preston. The noted Catholic composer John Lee was organist here in the 1930s.

=== Presbytery ===
Attached to the church is a presbytery dating probably from the same time as the church. It is built in red brick with blue brick bands and a hipped slate roof. The presbytery is in two storeys with a six-bay front and a porch at the right end. The windows are sashes.

== Appraisal ==
The church was designated as a Grade II listed building on 29 July 1999. Grade II is the lowest of the three grades of listing and is applied to buildings that are "nationally important and of special interest". The presbytery is listed separately at Grade II.

== Present day ==
St Joseph's is an active Roman Catholic church in the diocese of Liverpool. Also in the parish is the Church of Our Lady of Lourdes in Waterloo Road. Masses are regularly celebrated in both churches on Saturdays and Sundays. The parish hosts a variety of groups and events.

== See also ==
- Listed buildings in Birkdale
