= Hillside, Merseyside =

Coordinates: 53.6215°N 3.0234°W

Hillside
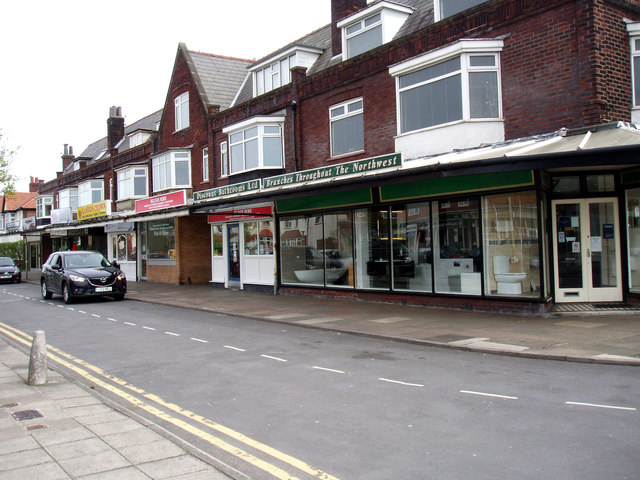
- Hillside Village shops

- Location in Southport Location within Merseyside
- Civil parish: Birkdale
- Metropolitan borough: Sefton
- Metropolitan county: Merseyside
- Region: North West
- Country: England
- Sovereign state: United Kingdom
- Post town: Southport
- Postcode district: PR8
- Dialling code: 01704
- Police: Merseyside
- Fire: Merseyside
- Ambulance: North West
- UK Parliament: Southport

Hillside is a residential suburb of the seaside town of Southport, England. It is surrounded by Birkdale, a former town in its own right, but part of Southport itself since amalgamation in 1912. It takes its name from a building named Hill Side, clearly evident on early maps. There was also Hillside Farm, part of which still survives on Hillside Golf Course. The original Birkdale station was in Hillside, situated at the present junction of Dunkirk Road and Dover Road.

== Transport ==
There are good networks of transport to Hillside.

=== Rail ===
A popular method of transport is via the Hillside railway station, which opened in May 1926 links the suburb with Southport and Liverpool. The station is very popular in the golfing season or when the Golf Open Championship is held at the Royal Birkdale Golf Club as Hillside station is the nearest train station to Royal Birkdale.

=== Road ===
There are two A roads that run through or close to the suburb, these being the A565 road and the A5267 road.

=== Bus ===
There are bus services through Hillside that are run by Arriva North West and Stagecoach in Preston linking from Preston -Southport - Liverpool.

== Religion ==
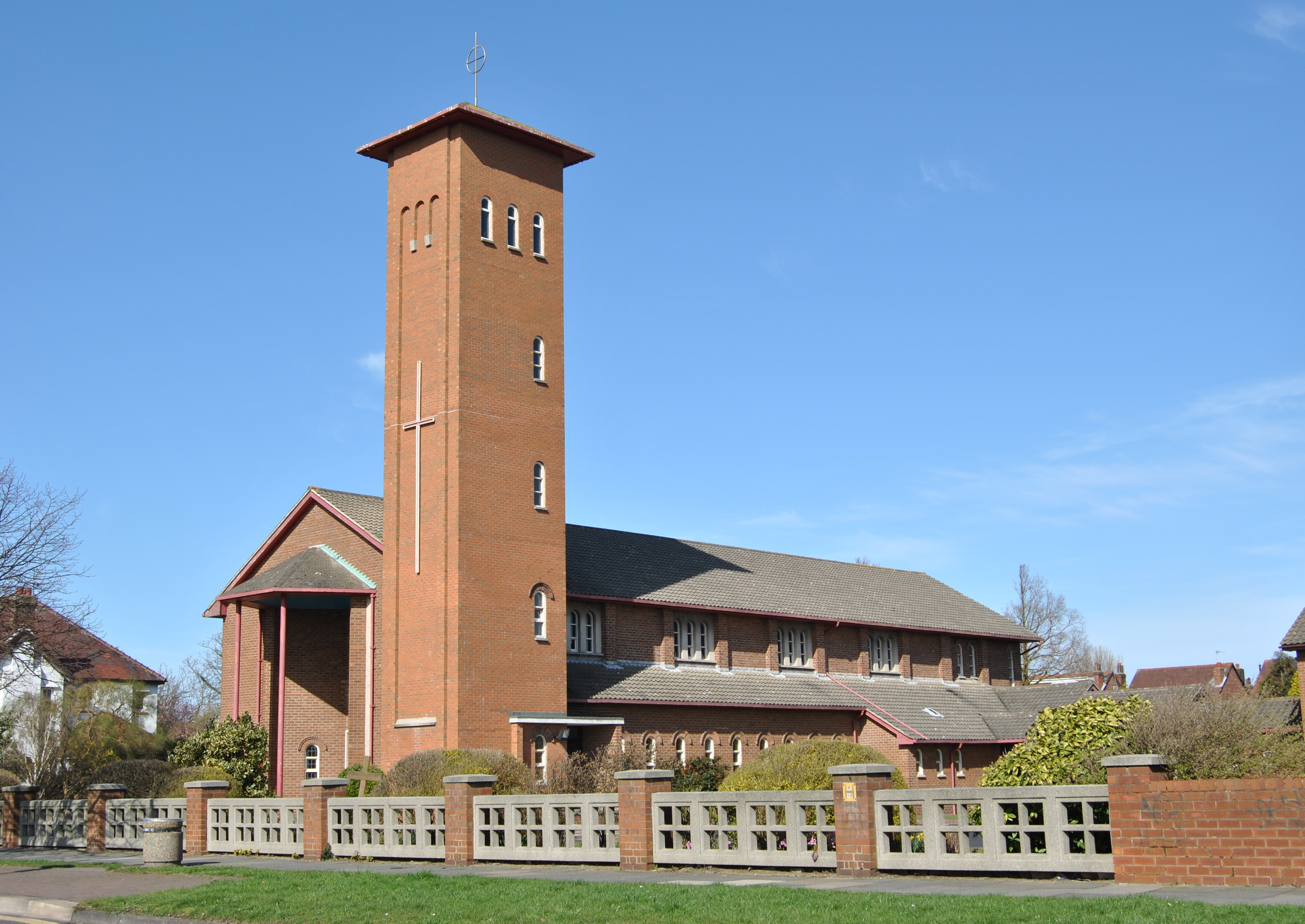
Our Lady of Lourdes and St. Joseph Church, Hillside

There are four churches in or close to Hillside; St John's C of E on St Johns Road, Birkdale, Our Lady of Lourdes which opened in 1956 on Waterloo Road, Hillside, and St. Joseph Church (close by in Birkdale) are both Roman Catholic churches. There is also Liverpool Road Methodist Church on the A5267 road lying close by in Birkdale.

== Education ==
There are two primary schools close to Hillside, Farnborough Road Junior School and Our Lady of Lourdes RC Primary School, one of the feeder schools to Christ the King secondary school a catholic school. Both located close by in Birkdale. There are also two secondary schools in the local area, Greenbank High School in Hillside which is an all-girls school and Birkdale High School also in Hillside, which is an all-boys school. There was once a third secondary school, Ainsdale Hope High School which shut in 2008 with the remaining children merging into the other three secondary schools in the area.

== Landmarks ==
The most famous landmark is the art deco style 'Round House' which was built as a house in 1924 by local builder Luke Highton, who fulfilled his dream of building a rotunda, complete with rooftop observatory, at the age of 74. The dome on top of the house was restored by the owners in 2007. The house has great views over the local area; Winter Hill can be seen to the north east and the gas rig in Liverpool Bay to the south west.

== Sport ==
The village is surrounded by many golf courses, one being the world-famous Royal Birkdale Golf Club. Hillside also has its own golf club which is split from the Royal Birkdale Golf Course by the local Birkdale and Ainsdale Hills Local Nature Reserve and in part, runs along the Liverpool - Southport Railway Line.

Hillside is also home to Southport Rugby Football Club, situated on Waterloo Road, opposite Our Lady of Lourdes church, a 3-minute walk from Hillside Railway Station.

Hillside has a village centre that contains local shops, amenities and bars.

== Geography ==
The elevation at the centre of Hillside is given as 39ft (approx 12m). The geology is blown sand over mudstone. Merseyside is estuarine with intertidal mudflats/sand flats, salt marsh and low exposed cliffs. There is a flat landscape with broad panoramic views.
