= Fuladi, Kermanshah =

Fuladi فولادي
- Village
- Location within Iran
- Coordinates: 34°24′16″N 45°59′21″E
- Country: Iran
- Province: Kermanshah
- County: Sarpol-e Zahab
- Bakhsh: Central
- Rural District: Beshiva Pataq

Population (2006)
  - Total: 451
- Time zone: UTC+3:30 (IRST)
  - Summer (DST): UTC+4:30 (IRDT)

Fuladi (Persian: فولادي, also Romanized as Fūlādī) is a village in Beshiva Pataq Rural District, in the Central District of Sarpol-e Zahab County, Kermanshah Province, Iran. At the 2006 census, its population was 451, in 108 families.
