= Torkeh-ye Sofla, Dalahu =

Torkeh-ye Sofla تركه سفلي
- Village
- Location within Iran
- Coordinates: 34°26′34″N 46°23′19″E
- Country: Iran
- Province: Kermanshah
- County: Dalahu
- Bakhsh: Gahvareh
- Rural District: Gurani

Population (2006)
  - Total: 23
- Time zone: UTC+3:30 (IRST)
  - Summer (DST): UTC+4:30 (IRDT)

Torkeh-ye Sofla (Persian: تركه سفلي, also Romanized as Torkeh-ye Soflá; also known as Torkeh) is a village in Gurani Rural District, Gahvareh District, Dalahu County, Kermanshah Province, Iran. At the 2006 census, its population was 23, in 4 families.
