= Hillside railway station =

Railway station in Merseyside, England

Hillside
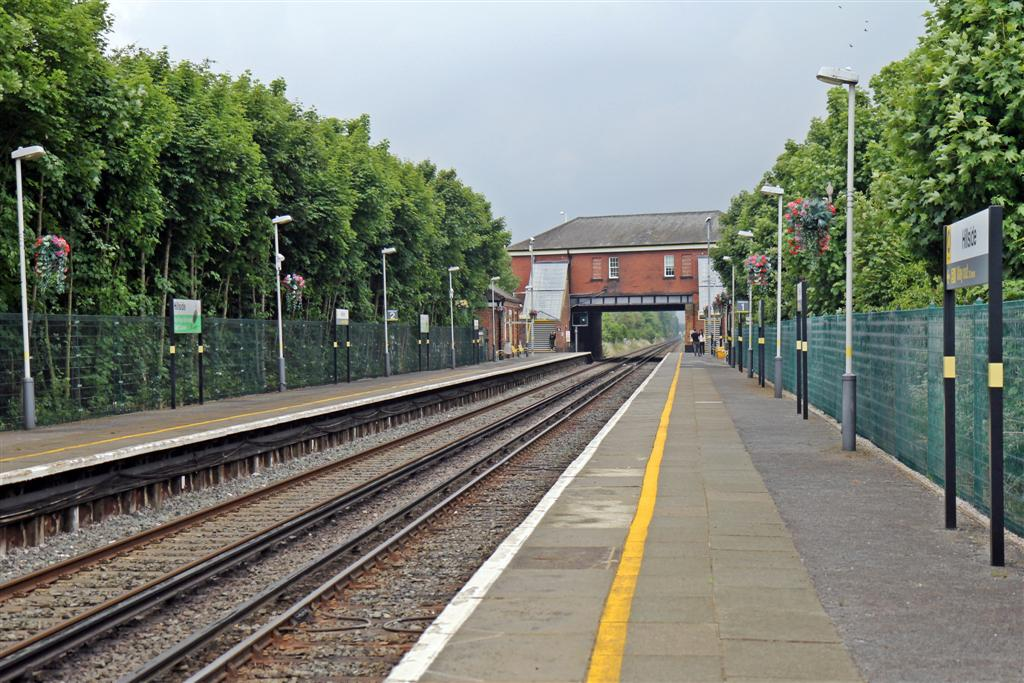

General information
- Location: Birkdale, Sefton; England
- Coordinates: 53.622°N 3.025°W
- Grid reference: SD323144
- Manager: Merseyrail
- Transit authority: Merseytravel
- Platforms: 2

Other information
- Station code: HIL
- Fare zone: D1
- Classification: DfT category E

History
- Opened: May 1926

Passengers
- 2021/22: ▲0.475 million
- 2022/23: ▲0.508 million
- 2023/24: ▲0.547 million
- 2024/25: ▲0.642 million
- 2025/26: ▲0.707 million
Location
Notes
- Passenger statistics from the Office of Rail and Road

Hillside railway station serves the southern half of the Birkdale area of Southport, England. It is located on the Northern Line of the Southport branch of the Merseyrail network's.

It is the closest station to the Royal Birkdale golf course, and is extremely busy when major events (such as the Open Championship) are held there.

== History ==
Hillside opened in May 1926 as an intermediate station on the ex-Lancashire and Yorkshire Railway (LYR) after the 1923 grouping into the London, Midland and Scottish Railway, and long after the railway had originally opened in 1848. By this time, the area had developed into a sizable residential suburb of Southport.

Nationalisation followed in 1948 and in 1978 the station became part of the Merseyrail network's Northern Line (operated by British Rail until privatised in 1995).

== Facilities ==
Safety and security features at this station include CCTV, an induction loop is installed, shelters and seats and a public telephone. There is no wheelchair access at this station, as the only access to the platforms is by stairs; the nearest stations with disabled access are Birkdale and Ainsdale. The ticket office is always staffed by at least one member of staff from before the start of train services until 00:30 each evening. There is cycle storage for 6 cycles and secure storage for 40 cycles.

Merseytravel announced in April 2019 that they had been successful in a bid for funding lifts being installed at the station under the Department for Transport's ‘Access for All’ programme. The lifts are expected to be installed at some point over the following five years. The lifts had their official opening on 21 October 2022.

== Services ==
Trains operate every 15 minutes throughout the day from Monday to Saturday to Southport to the north, and to Liverpool Central to the south. Sunday services are every 30 minutes in each direction.

== Gallery ==
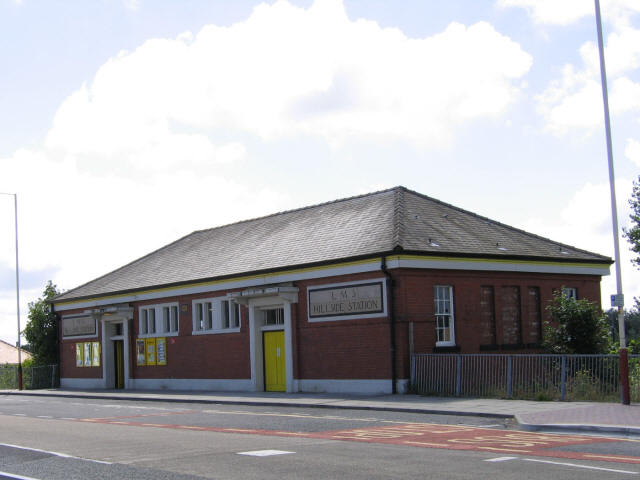
The station ticket office, viewed from the road.

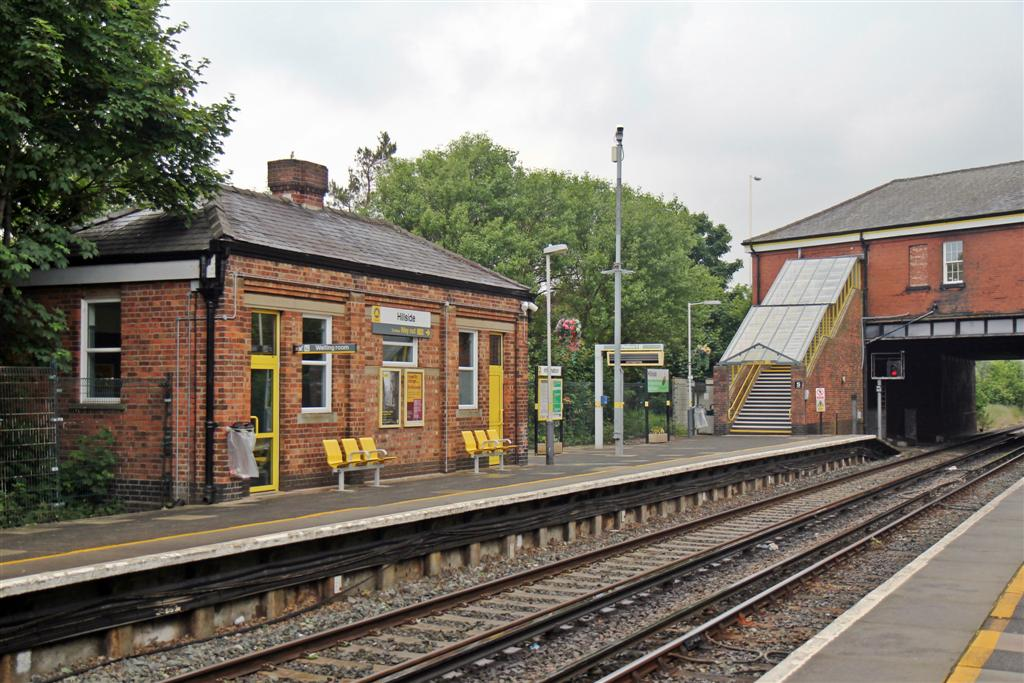
The waiting room on the Southport-bound platform.

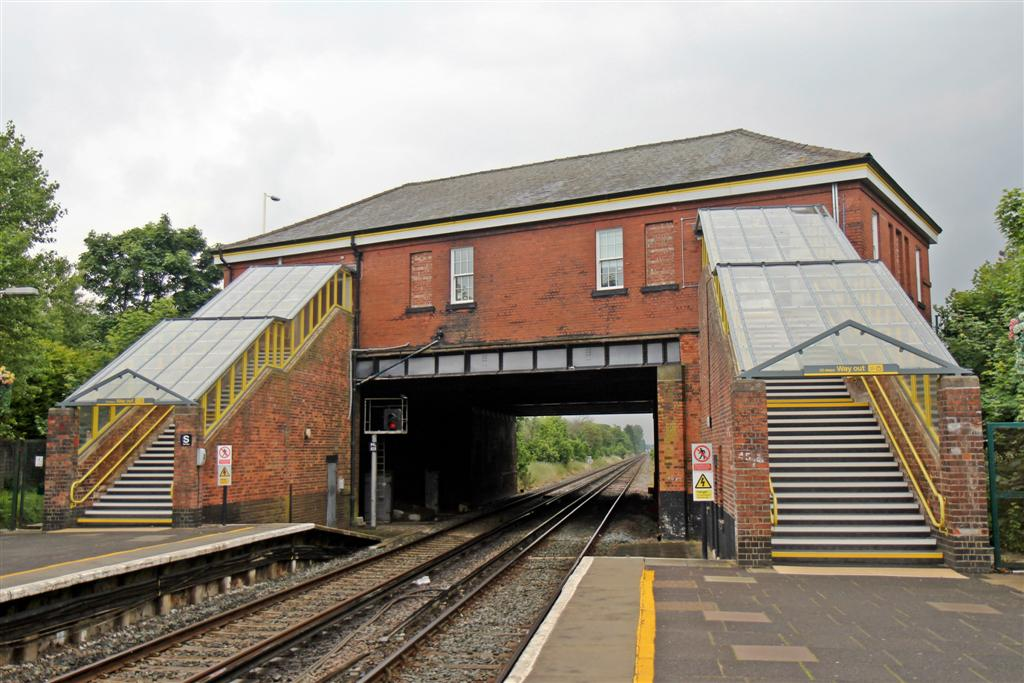
The booking office and footbridge, viewed from the platform.

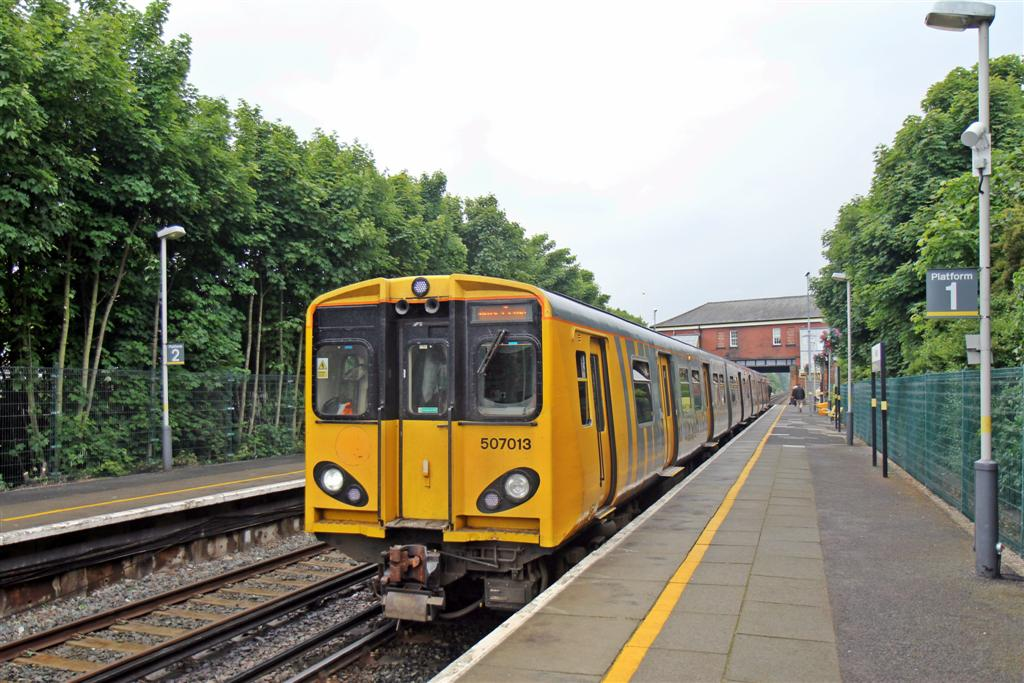
A Merseyrail Class 507 waits at the station.

Preceding station	National Rail	Following station
Birkdale towards Southport	Merseyrail; Southport - Hunts Cross	Ainsdale towards Liverpool Central
