= Palanganeh Rural District =

Rural district in Kermanshah province, Iran

Palanganeh Rural District Persian: دهستان پلنگانه
- Rural District
- Location within Iran
- Coordinates: 34°48′05″N 46°29′37″E
- Country: Iran
- Province: Kermanshah
- County: Javanrud
- District: Central
- Capital: Saru Khan

Population (2016)
  - Total: 7,492
- Time zone: UTC+3:30 (IRST)

Palanganeh Rural District (Persian: دهستان پلنگانه) is in the Central District of Javanrud County, Kermanshah province, Iran. Its capital is the village of Saru Khan.

== Demographics ==
=== Population ===
At the time of the 2006 National Census, the rural district's population was 4,687 in 995 households. There were 5,936 inhabitants in 1,528 households at the following census of 2011. The 2016 census measured the population of the rural district as 7,492 in 2,054 households. The most populous of its 46 villages was Safiabad, with 2,402 people.
