= Bazan Rural District =

Rural district in Kermanshah province, Iran

Bazan Rural District Persian: دهستان بازان
- Rural District
- Location within Iran
- Coordinates: 34°44′12″N 46°20′10″E
- Country: Iran
- Province: Kermanshah
- County: Javanrud
- District: Central
- Capital: Zeylan

Population (2016)
  - Total: 4,647
- Time zone: UTC+3:30 (IRST)

Bazan Rural District (Persian: دهستان بازان) is in the Central District of Javanrud County, Kermanshah province, Iran. Its capital is the village of Zeylan.

== Demographics ==
=== Population ===
At the time of the 2006 National Census, the rural district's population was 5,257 in 1,116 households. There were 4,846 inhabitants in 1,198 households at the following census of 2011. The 2016 census measured the population of the rural district as 4,647 in 1,274 households. The most populous of its 33 villages was Zeylan, with 1,557 people.
