= Central District (Javanrud County) =

District in Kermanshah province, Iran

Central District (Javanrud County) Persian: بخش مرکزی شهرستان جوانرود
- District
- Location within Iran
- Coordinates: 34°45′08″N 46°24′32″E
- Country: Iran
- Province: Kermanshah
- County: Javanrud
- Capital: Javanrud

Population (2016)
  - Total: 66,493
- Time zone: UTC+3:30 (IRST)

The Central District of Javanrud County (Persian: بخش مرکزی شهرستان جوانرود) is in Kermanshah province, Iran. Its capital is the city of Javanrud.

== Demographics ==
=== Population ===
At the time of the 2006 National Census, the district's population was 53,048 in 11,702 households. The following census in 2011 counted 62,255 people in 15,769 households. The 2016 census measured the population of the district as 66,493 inhabitants in 18,338 households.

=== Administrative divisions ===
Central District (Javanrud County) Population
Administrative Divisions	2006	2011	2016
Bazan RD	5,257	4,836	4,647
Palanganeh RD	4,687	5,936	7,492
Javanrud (city)	43,104	51,483	54,354
Total	53,048	62,255	66,493
RD = Rural District
