= Nasanar =

Nasanar نسنار
- Village
- Location within Iran
- Coordinates: 35°10′26″N 46°34′02″E
- Country: Iran
- Province: Kurdistan
- County: Sarvabad
- Bakhsh: Central
- Rural District: Bisaran

Population (2006)
  - Total: 562
- Time zone: UTC+3:30 (IRST)
  - Summer (DST): UTC+4:30 (IRDT)

Nasanar (Persian: نسنار, also Romanized as Nasanār; also known as Nasbanār) is a village in Bisaran Rural District, in the Central District of Sarvabad County, Kurdistan Province, Iran. At the 2006 census, its population was 562, in 144 families. The village is populated by Kurds.

== See also ==
- Vaysian
- Cheshmidar
- Aryan
