= Salvation Force =

Kurdish Sufi militant group

- سپای ڕزگاری سپاه رستگاری
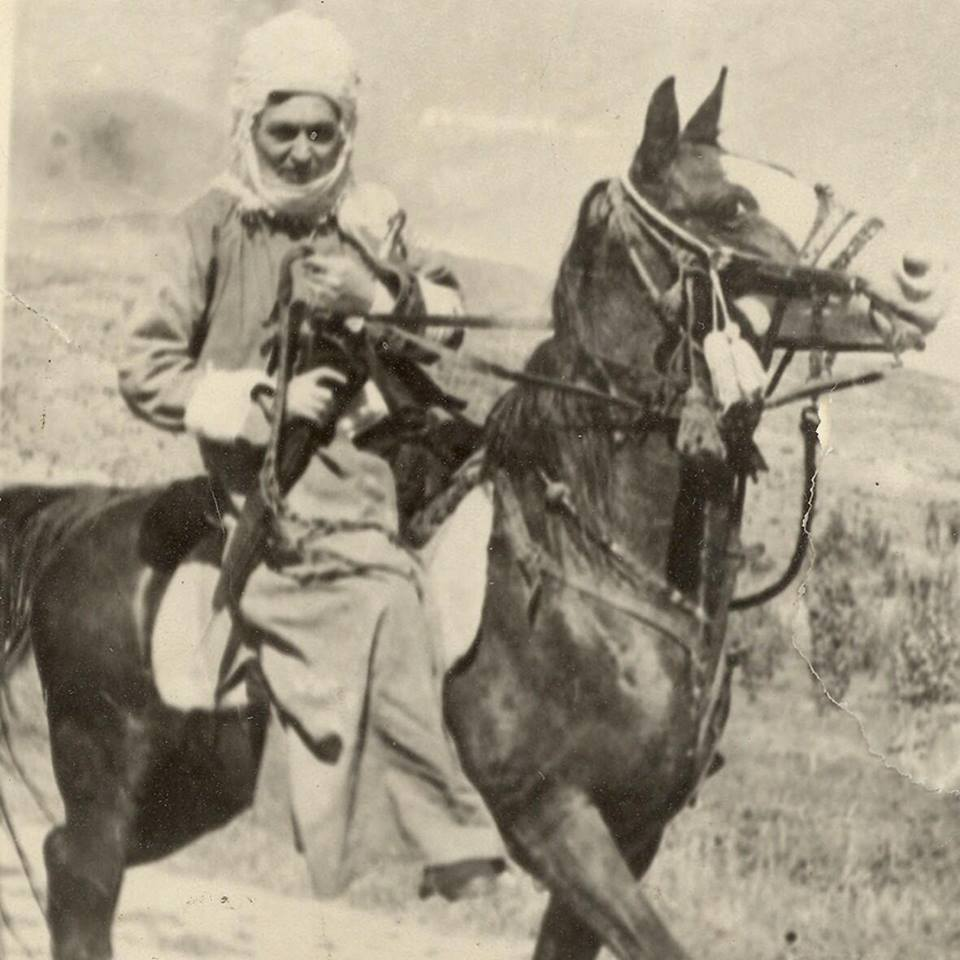
- Sheikh Muhammad Uthman Siraj al-Din Naqshbandi on horseback
- Other name: Army of Umar ibn al-Khattab
- Founding leader: Muhammad Uthman Siraj al-Din Naqshbandi
- Leaders: Madih Naqshbandi; Muhammad Ziya Naqshbandi
- Founded: 1980
- Dissolved: 1988
- Country: Iran
- Active regions: Avroman
- Ideology: Kurdish-Islamic nationalism Naqshbandi Islamism; Anti-Iranian sentiment
- Size: 5,000–6,000
- Wars: 1979–1983 Kurdistan conflict Iran–Iraq War

The Salvation Force (Kurdish: سپای ڕزگاری, Sipay Rizgarî; (Note: Various transliterations of the group's name, from both Persian and Kurdish, are used in English-language sources, including: Sipay Rizgari; Sipahî Rizgarî; Sepah-e Razgari; Spai Rizgari; Supay Rizgari) Persian: سپاه رستگاری, Sepāh-e Rastegāri) was a Naqshbandi Islamist militant group composed of Kurds, active in the Avroman region of Iranian Kurdistan during the 1979–1983 Kurdistan conflict and Iran–Iraq War. Like other Kurdish rebel groups in Iran, they aligned with and were armed by the Iraqi side. For the period of its existence, it was led by its founder Sheikh Muhammad Uthman Siraj al-Din Naqshbandi, of the prominent Sheikhs of Tawilah family.

== History ==
=== Background ===
Muhammad Uthman Siraj al-Din Naqshbandi, the group's founder, was born in Iraqi Kurdistan and was an Iraqi citizen. He fled to Iran in 1959 after getting into conflict with the political authorities of Iraq under Abd al-Karim Qasim, and established positive relations with the Iranian political authorities of the Pahlavi period. He became friends with Minister of the Court Amir-Asadollah Alam, and his sons took up roles in the Iranian government. He then made use of his relations with the Iranian government to consolidate his influence in the Avroman region. Iraqi Prime Minister Abd al-Karim Qasim was overthrown by the Ba'ath party in 1963, paving the way for contacts to be established between Muhammad Uthman Siraj al-Din Naqshbandi and the Iraqi authorities.

=== Formation and early activities ===
Following the victory of Ruhollah Khomeini in the Iranian Revolution, Muhammad Uthman Siraj al-Din Naqshbandi fled to Iraq and mobilised a force of 5,000–6,000 Kurds, creating the Salvation force. Muhammad Uthman Siraj al-Din Naqshbandi thereafter declared that the newly-established Islamic Republic was a non-Muslim entity, stating that the Kurds of the Salvation Force would repeat the Muslim conquest of Persia, while referring to the group with the nickname "Army of Umar ibn al-Khattab". He then issued a fatwa that whoever beheads 10 Iranian soldiers is guaranteed heaven.

While Muhammad Uthman Siraj al-Din Naqshbandi himself remained in Iraq, the militia was militarily commanded by his son Madih Naqshbandi. With the help of the Ba'athist regime ruling over Iraq, who provided the group with arms, the Salvation Force entered the Avroman region of Iranian Kurdistan in early 1980, forming an alliance with both the KDPI and Komala, also armed and funded by Ba'athist Iraq. For the first months of their existence, they were engaged only in active combat against the IRGC.

=== Conflict with rival Kurdish rebel groups ===
As a result of ideological disagreement between Islamist and Leftist Kurdish groups, they soon entered into conflict with their former allies KDPI and Komala. As part of their communist doctrine, Komala had been acting against landlords in Kurdistan, and saw Muhammad Uthman Siraj al-Din Naqshbandi, a wealthy land-owner, as a class enemy. The Salvation Force, meanwhile, viewed Komala as communist atheists. This conflict remained ideological until a few months into 1980, Komala forces from Marivan and Sanandaj and KDPI forces from Paveh and Avroman both attempted to disarm the Salvation Force, which started armed clashes.

Most militants of the Salvation Force did not want to fight other Kurds and therefore abandoned their service, which severely weakened the group. The Salvation Force's leadership, which was weary of the large number of members leaving it, resorted to assassinating former members in order to discourage anyone from leaving again. One of the group's commanders, Muhammad Ziya Naqshbandi, fearing the group's full destruction, even offered to cooperate with the IRGC against Komala, though nothing came of this.

=== Expulsion to Iraq and dissolution ===
In September–October 1981, the IRGC and the Islamic Peshmerga, under the command of Osman Fereshteh, collected 200 fighters and began an operation to clear Avroman Takht and its vicinity of all rebels. The Islamic Peshmerga were a pro-IRGC militia composed of local Kurds that were agitated by the instability that Kurdish separatist factions brought to their lands. The Salvation Force had deployed 300 fighters to, and established several military points in, the settlement and surrounding villages. As a result of the operation, approximately 50 Salvation Force fighters were killed and 200 captured. Additionally, the settlements of Avroman Takht, Bendul, Kamaleh, Zhivar, Belbar, Selin, and Rovar were returned to Iranian control. Iranian forces chased the fleeing Salvation Force forces as they were retreating from these settlements, and inflicted another blow on them in the village of Keymeneh, forcing them to retreat into Iraqi Kurdistan.

In the period following, the Salvation Force also entered into hostilities with the PUK, who opposed the group due to its close ties to the Iraqi authorities. As part of this opposition, the PUK harassed their troops and largely cut off their supply lines. By Autumn 1982, Sheikh Muhammad Uthman Siraj al-Din Naqshbandi had left Iraq for Western Europe, later settling in Turkey. His son Madih Naqshbandi, the commander of the Salvation Force, remained in Kurdistan for the time being.

Salvation Force continued to function as a group, fighting both Komala and Iranian government forces, until finally being disbanded in 1988, as a result of Iranian victory in Operation Dawn 10. The group's surviving members all either surrendered to Iranian forces and accepted whatever punishment they received, or settled in Iraqi Kurdistan in self-exile.

== Ideology ==
The Salvation Force followed the teachings of Sheikh Muhammad Uthman Siraj al-Din Naqshbandi, a Sunni Sufi of the Naqshbandi order. Ideologically, they were Jihadists, and enforced Sharia in the areas they controlled.

The region they controlled would experience an even stricter rule a few decades later by Salafists under the Islamic Emirate of Kurdistan. Sufis were persecuted in the emirate, and their khanqahs and dargahs were bombed. The militants in the Islamic emirate were anti-Iraqi, unlike the Salvation Force.

== See also ==
- Army of the Men of the Naqshbandi Order
