= Maziben =

Maziben ماضي بن
- Village
- Location within Iran
- Coordinates: 35°13′14″N 46°27′55″E
- Country: Iran
- Province: Kurdistan
- County: Sarvabad
- Bakhsh: Central
- Rural District: Razab

Population (2006)
  - Total: 576
- Time zone: UTC+3:30 (IRST)
  - Summer (DST): UTC+4:30 (IRDT)

Maziben (Persian: ماضي بن, also Romanized as Māẕīben and Māzī Bon; also known as Māzibin) is a village in Razab Rural District, in the Central District of Sarvabad County, Kurdistan Province, Iran. At the 2006 census, its population was 576, in 126 families. The village is populated by Kurds.
