= Yuzhenan =

Yuzhenan يوژنان
- Village
- Location within Iran
- Coordinates: 35°09′38″N 46°34′01″E
- Country: Iran
- Province: Kurdistan
- County: Sarvabad
- Bakhsh: Central
- Rural District: Bisaran

Population (2006)
  - Total: 214
- Time zone: UTC+3:30 (IRST)
  - Summer (DST): UTC+4:30 (IRDT)

Yuzhenan (Persian: يوژنان, also Romanized as Yūzhenān; also known as Veznān) is a village in Bisaran Rural District, in the Central District of Sarvabad County, Kurdistan Province, Iran. At the 2006 census, its population was 214, in 47 families. The village is populated by Kurds.
