= Espeh Riz =

Espeh Riz اسپه ريز
- Village
- Location within Iran
- Coordinates: 35°08′58″N 46°24′13″E
- Country: Iran
- Province: Kurdistan
- County: Sarvabad
- Bakhsh: Uraman
- Rural District: Shalyar

Population (2006)
  - Total: 20
- Time zone: UTC+3:30 (IRST)
  - Summer (DST): UTC+4:30 (IRDT)

Espeh Riz (Persian: اسپه ريز, also Romanized as Espeh Rīz; also known as Asbriz, Asparāz, Asparīz, Asperīz, Aspīrāz, Asp-i-Riz, and Esperīz) is a village in Shalyar Rural District, Uraman District, Sarvabad County, Kurdistan Province, Iran. At the 2006 census, its population was 20, in 7 families. The village is populated by Kurds.
