= Dezli =

Dezli (Persian: دزلي) may refer to:

- Dezli, Gilan, a village in Gilan Province, Iran
- Dezli, Kurdistan, a village in Kurdistan Province, Iran
- Dezli Rural District, a district in Kurdistan Province, Iran
