= Sureh Tu =

Sureh Tu سوره تو
- Village
- Location within Iran
- Coordinates: 35°07′10″N 46°33′26″E
- Country: Iran
- Province: Kurdistan
- County: Sarvabad
- Bakhsh: Central
- Rural District: Zherizhah

Population (2006)
  - Total: 646
- Time zone: UTC+3:30 (IRST)
  - Summer (DST): UTC+4:30 (IRDT)

Sureh Tu (Persian: سوره تو, also Romanized as Sūreh Tū; also known as Sorkhah Tūt, Sorkheh Tūt, and Surtu) is a village in Zherizhah Rural District, in the Central District of Sarvabad County, Kurdistan Province, Iran. At the 2006 census, its population was 646, in 157 families. The village is populated by Kurds.
