= Zalkeh =

Zalkeh or Zelkeh (Persian: ذلكه) may refer to:

- Zalkeh, Divandarreh
- Zalkeh, Sarvabad
- Zalakeh (disambiguation)
