= Damiv =

Damayov دميو
- Village
- Location within Iran
- Coordinates: 35°20′09″N 46°11′38″E
- Country: Iran
- Province: Kurdistan
- County: Sarvabad
- Bakhsh: Central
- Rural District: Dezli

Population (2006)
  - Total: 465
- Time zone: UTC+3:30 (IRST)
  - Summer (DST): UTC+4:30 (IRDT)

Damiv (Persian: دميو, also Romanized as Damīv) is a village in Dezli Rural District, in the Central District of Sarvabad County, Kurdistan Province, Iran. At the 2006 census, its population was 465, in 109 families. The village is populated by Kurds.
