= Deh-e Kanan =

Deh-e Kanan دهكانان
- Village
- Location within Iran
- Coordinates: 35°06′00″N 46°34′53″E
- Country: Iran
- Province: Kurdistan
- County: Sarvabad
- Bakhsh: Central
- Rural District: Zherizhah

Population (2006)
  - Total: 96
- Time zone: UTC+3:30 (IRST)
  - Summer (DST): UTC+4:30 (IRDT)

Deh-e Kanan (Persian: دهكانان, also Romanized as Deh-e Kānān and Dehkānān; also known as Deh-i-Kan‘ān) is a village in Zherizhah Rural District, in the Central District of Sarvabad County, Kurdistan Province, Iran. At the 2006 census, its population was 96, in 23 families. The village is populated by Kurds.
