= Uraman =

Uraman or Owraman or Ooraman (Persian: اورامان) may refer to:

- Uraman Takht, a city in Sarvabad County, Kurdistan province
- Uraman District, an administrative subdivision of Sarvabad County, Kurdistan province
- Uraman Takht Rural District, an administrative subdivision of Sarvabad County, Kurdistan province
- Avroman a geographic region located in western Iran and north-eastern Iraq
