= Almaneh =

Almaneh آلمانه
- Village
- Location within Iran
- Coordinates: 35°23′07″N 46°18′55″E
- Country: Iran
- Province: Kurdistan
- County: Sarvabad
- Bakhsh: Central
- Rural District: Kusalan

Population (2006)
  - Total: 881
- Time zone: UTC+3:30 (IRST)
  - Summer (DST): UTC+4:30 (IRDT)

Almaneh (Persian: آلمانه, also Romanized as Ālmāneh; also known as Āmāneh) is a village in Kusalan Rural District, in the Central District of Sarvabad County, Kurdistan Province, Iran. At the 2006 census, its population was 881, in 208 families. The village is populated by Kurds.
