= Sarpir, Kurdistan =

Sarpir سرپير
- Village
- Location within Iran
- Coordinates: 35°15′22″N 46°16′01″E
- Country: Iran
- Province: Kurdistan
- County: Sarvabad
- Bakhsh: Uraman
- Rural District: Uraman Takht

Population (2006)
  - Total: 727
- Time zone: UTC+3:30 (IRST)
  - Summer (DST): UTC+4:30 (IRDT)

Sarpir (Persian: سرپير, also Romanized as Sarpīr) is a village in Uraman Takht Rural District, Uraman District, Sarvabad County, Kurdistan Province, Iran. At the 2006 census, its population was 727, in 171 families. The village is populated by Kurds.
