= Haluzhan =

Haluzhan هالوژان
- Village
- Location within Iran
- Coordinates: 35°23′27″N 46°18′23″E
- Country: Iran
- Province: Kurdistan
- County: Sarvabad
- Bakhsh: Central
- Rural District: Kusalan

Population (2006)
  - Total: 111
- Time zone: UTC+3:30 (IRST)
  - Summer (DST): UTC+4:30 (IRDT)

Haluzhan (Persian: هالوژان, also Romanized as Hālūzhān; also known as Halūchān, Halūjān, Halūrān, and Hās̄urān) is a village in Kusalan Rural District, in the Central District of Sarvabad County, Kurdistan Province, Iran. At the 2006 census, its population was 111, in 23 families. The village is populated by Kurds.
