= Vargah Vir =

Vargah Vir ورگه وير
- Village
- Location within Iran
- Coordinates: 35°13′00″N 46°21′00″E
- Country: Iran
- Province: Kurdistan
- County: Sarvabad
- Bakhsh: Uraman
- Rural District: Shalyar

Population (2006)
  - Total: 24
- Time zone: UTC+3:30 (IRST)
  - Summer (DST): UTC+4:30 (IRDT)

Vargah Vir (Persian: ورگه وير, also Romanized as Vargah Vīr; also known as Vargah Vīrā) is a village in Shalyar Rural District, Uraman District, Sarvabad County, Kurdistan Province, Iran. At the 2006 census, its population was 24, in 6 families. The village is populated by Kurds.
