= Tefli =

Tefli تفلی
- Village
- Location within Iran
- Coordinates: 35°19′57″N 46°18′37″E
- Country: Iran
- Province: Kurdistan
- County: Sarvabad
- Bakhsh: Central
- Rural District: Kusalan

Population (2006)
  - Total: 567
- Time zone: UTC+3:30 (IRST)
  - Summer (DST): UTC+4:30 (IRDT)

Tefli (Persian: تفلی, also Romanized as Teflī and Taflī; also known as Tavila and Tifli) is a village in Kusalan Rural District, in the Central District of Sarvabad County, Kurdistan Province, Iran. At the 2006 census, its population was 567, in 143 families. The village is populated by Kurds.
