= Daleh Marz =

Dalamarz دله مرز
- Village
- Location within Iran
- Coordinates: 35°07′01″N 46°29′02″E
- Country: Iran
- Province: Kurdistan
- County: Sarvabad
- Bakhsh: Central
- Rural District: Zherizhah

Population (2006)
  - Total: 636
- Time zone: UTC+3:30 (IRST)
  - Summer (DST): UTC+4:30 (IRDT)

Dalamarz (Persian: دله مرز, also Romanized as Dalamarz; also known as Dalāmarz and Delāmarz) is a village in Zherizhah Rural District, in the Central District of Sarvabad County, Kurdistan Province, Iran. At the 2006 census, its population was 636, in 141 families. The village is populated by Kurds.
