= Gelaneh =

Gelaneh گلانه
- Village
- Location within Iran
- Coordinates: 35°22′40″N 46°17′56″E
- Country: Iran
- Province: Kurdistan
- County: Sarvabad
- Bakhsh: Central
- Rural District: Kusalan

Population (2006)
  - Total: 286
- Time zone: UTC+3:30 (IRST)
  - Summer (DST): UTC+4:30 (IRDT)

Gelaneh (Persian: گلانه, also Romanized as Gelāneh and Golāneh; also known as Veylāneh and Wailāneh) is a village in Kusalan Rural District, in the Central District of Sarvabad County, Kurdistan Province, Iran. At the 2006 census, its population was 286, in 52 families. The village is populated by Kurds.
