= Sarumal =

Sarumal سرومال
- Village
- Location within Iran
- Coordinates: 35°09′57″N 46°30′25″E
- Country: Iran
- Province: Kurdistan
- County: Sarvabad
- Bakhsh: Central
- Rural District: Zherizhah

Population (2006)
  - Total: 207
- Time zone: UTC+3:30 (IRST)
  - Summer (DST): UTC+4:30 (IRDT)

Sarumal (Persian: سرومال, also Romanized as Sarūmāl) is a village in Zherizhah Rural District, in the Central District of Sarvabad County, Kurdistan Province, Iran. At the 2006 census, its population was 207, in 57 families. The village is populated by Kurds.
