= Ri Vari =

Rū Vari رو وري
- Village
- Location within Iran
- Coordinates: 35°16′00″N 46°14′08″E
- Country: Iran
- Province: Kurdistan
- County: Sarvabad
- Bakhsh: Uraman
- Rural District: Uraman Takht

Population (2006)
  - Total: 412
- Time zone: UTC+3:30 (IRST)
  - Summer (DST): UTC+4:30 (IRDT)

Ri Vari (Persian: ري وري, also Romanized as Rī Varī; also known as Rūbarī) is a village in Uraman Takht Rural District, Uraman District, Sarvabad County, Kurdistan Province, Iran. At the 2006 census, its population was 412, in 95 families. The village is populated by Kurds.
