= Kaklikabad =

Kaklikabad ككليك آباد
- Village
- Location within Iran
- Coordinates: 35°09′49″N 46°29′48″E
- Country: Iran
- Province: Kurdistan
- County: Sarvabad
- Bakhsh: Central
- Rural District: Zherizhah

Population (2006)
  - Total: 184
- Time zone: UTC+3:30 (IRST)
  - Summer (DST): UTC+4:30 (IRDT)

Kaklikabad (Persian: ككليك آباد, also Romanized as Kaklīkābād; also known as Kaklīabad, Kalīkābād, and Kalkīk) is a village in Zherizhah Rural District, in the Central District of Sarvabad County, Kurdistan Province, Iran. At the 2006 census, its population was 184, in 47 families. The village is populated by Kurds.
