= Harsin, Kurdistan =

Harsin هرسين
- Village
- Location within Iran
- Coordinates: 35°12′13″N 46°33′31″E
- Country: Iran
- Province: Kurdistan
- County: Sarvabad
- Bakhsh: Central
- Rural District: Bisaran

Population (2006)
  - Total: 481
- Time zone: UTC+3:30 (IRST)
  - Summer (DST): UTC+4:30 (IRDT)

Harsin (Persian: هرسين, also Romanized as Harsīn) is a village in Bisaran Rural District, in the Central District of Sarvabad County, Kurdistan Province, Iran. At the 2006 census, its population was 481, in 121 families. The village is populated by horamies(hawrami).
