= Zakariya =

Zakariya may refer to:

== People ==
- Zakariya, the father of John the Baptist (Yahya) in Islam
- Zakariya (name), a common personal name in West Asia

== Places ==
- Zakariya, Iran, a village in western Iran
- Zakaria, Iran, a village in northeastern Iran
- Az-Zakariyya, Palestinian village depopulated in the 1948 Arab-Israeli War
