= Bolbar =

Bolbar بلبر
- Village
- Location within Iran
- Coordinates: 35°14′25″N 46°17′45″E
- Country: Iran
- Province: Kurdistan
- County: Sarvabad
- Bakhsh: Uraman
- Rural District: Shalyar

Population (2006)
  - Total: 954
- Time zone: UTC+3:30 (IRST)
  - Summer (DST): UTC+4:30 (IRDT)

Bolbar (Persian: بلبر; Sorani Kurdish: بڵبەر, romanized: Biłber) is a village in Shalyar Rural District, Uraman District, Sarvabad County, Kurdistan Province, Iran. At the 2006 census, its population was 954, in 203 families. The village is populated by Kurds.
