= Dezvand =

Dezvand or Dezavand (Persian: دزوند), also rendered as Dezeh Vand or Dizawan or Dizeh Vand, may refer to:

- Dezvand-e Olya
- Dezvand-e Sofla
