= Zakarian, Iran =

Zakarian ذكريان
- Village
- Location within Iran
- Coordinates: 35°23′24″N 46°15′13″E
- Country: Iran
- Province: Kurdistan
- County: Sarvabad
- Bakhsh: Central
- Rural District: Dezli

Population (2006)
  - Total: 355
- Time zone: UTC+3:30 (IRST)
  - Summer (DST): UTC+4:30 (IRDT)

Zakarian (Persian: ذكريان, also Romanized as Z̄akarīān, Z̄akareyān, Z̄akarīyān, Zakriān, and Zakriyān; also known as Z̄akarīyā) is a village in Dezli Rural District, in the Central District of Sarvabad County, Kurdistan Province, Iran. At the 2006 census, its population was 355, in 84 families. The village is populated by Kurds.
