= Karabad =

karawa كر آباد
- Village
- Location within Iran
- Coordinates: 35°15′45″N 46°25′26″E
- Country: Iran
- Province: Kurdistan
- County: Sarvabad
- Bakhsh: Central
- Rural District: Razab

Population (2006)
  - Total: 665
- Time zone: UTC+3:30 (IRST)
  - Summer (DST): UTC+4:30 (IRDT)

Karawa (Persian: كر آباد, also Romanized as Karābād and Karrābād; also known as Garābād and Karāwa) is a village in Razab Rural District, in the Central District of Sarvabad County, Kurdistan Province, Iran. At the 2006 census, its population was 665, in 164 families.

The village is populated by Kurds.
