= Vaysian =

Vaysian ويسيان
- Village
- Location within Iran
- Coordinates: 35°15′41″N 46°14′21″E
- Country: Iran
- Province: Kurdistan
- County: Sarvabad
- Bakhsh: Uraman
- Rural District: Uraman Takht

Population (2006)
  - Total: 247
- Time zone: UTC+3:30 (IRST)
  - Summer (DST): UTC+4:30 (IRDT)

Vaysian (Persian: ويسيان, also Romanized as Vaysīān; also known as Vaysīā and Veyseva) is a village in Uraman Takht Rural District, Uraman District, Sarvabad County, Kurdistan Province, Iran. At the 2006 census, its population was 247, in 59 families. The village is populated by Kurds.
