= Paygelan =

Village in Kurdistan province, Iran

Paygelan Persian: پايگلان
- Village
- Location within Iran Location within Iran Kurdistan
- Coordinates: 35°08′18″N 46°36′10″E
- Country: Iran
- Province: Kurdistan
- County: Sarvabad
- District: Central
- Rural District: Paygelan

Population (2016)
  - Total: 1,440
- Time zone: UTC+3:30 (IRST)

Paygelan (Persian: پايگلان) (Note: Also romanized as Pāygalān and Pāygelān; also known as Pa yi Gīlān, Pai Gilan, Pāy Kalān, and Pāykalān) is a village in, and the capital of, Paygelan Rural District of the Central District of Sarvabad County, Kurdistan province, Iran.

== Demographics ==
=== Ethnicity ===
The village is populated by Kurds.

=== Population ===
At the time of the 2006 National Census, the village's population was 1,920 in 457 households. The following census in 2011 counted 1,645 people in 505 households. The 2016 census measured the population of the village as 1,440 people in 475 households. It was the most populous village in its rural district.
