= Dal, Kurdistan =

Village in Kurdistan province, Iran

Dal Persian: دل
- Village
- Location within Iran Location within Iran Kurdistan
- Coordinates: 35°08′19″N 46°27′57″E
- Country: Iran
- Province: Kurdistan
- County: Sarvabad
- District: Central
- Rural District: Zherizhah

Population (2016)
  - Total: 705
- Time zone: UTC+3:30 (IRST)

Dal (Persian: دل) is a village in Zherizhah Rural District of the Central District of Sarvabad County, Kurdistan province, Iran.

== Demographics ==
=== Ethnicity ===
The village is populated by Kurds.

=== Population ===
At the time of the 2006 National Census, the village's population was 1,099 in 279 households. The following census in 2011 counted 869 people in 251 households. The 2016 census measured the population of the village as 705 people in 223 households. It was the most populous village in its rural district.
