= Qaleh Ji =

Village in Kurdistan province, Iran

Qaleh Ji Persian: قلعه‌جی
- Village
- Location within Iran Location within Iran Kurdistan
- Coordinates: 35°21′35″N 46°16′58″E
- Country: Iran
- Province: Kurdistan
- County: Sarvabad
- District: Central
- Rural District: Kusalan

Population (2016)
  - Total: 1,383
- Time zone: UTC+3:30 (IRST)

Qaleh Ji (Persian: قلعه‌جی) (Note: Also romanized as Qal‘eh Jī; also known as Qal‘eh Jeh, Qal‘eh Ju, and Qal‘eh Jū) is a village in, and the capital of, Kusalan Rural District (Note: Formerly Sarvabad Rural District) of the Central District of Sarvabad County, Kurdistan province, Iran.

== Demographics ==
=== Ethnicity ===
The village is populated by Kurds.

=== Population ===
At the time of the 2006 National Census, the village's population was 1,633 in 393 households. The following census in 2011 counted 1,491 people in 396 households. The 2016 census measured the population of the village as 1,383 people in 405 households.
