= Dezvand-e Olya =

Dezvand-e Olya دزوندعليا
- Village
- Location within Iran
- Coordinates: 35°06′14″N 46°32′45″E
- Country: Iran
- Province: Kurdistan
- County: Sarvabad
- Bakhsh: Central
- Rural District: Zherizhah

Population (2006)
  - Total: 245
- Time zone: UTC+3:30 (IRST)
  - Summer (DST): UTC+4:30 (IRDT)

Dezvand-e Olya (Persian: دزوندعليا, also Romanized as Dezvand-e ‘Olyā; also known as Dezāvand-e Bālā, Dezāvand-e ‘Olyā, Dezvand-e Bālā, and Dīzehvand-e Bālā) is a village in Zherizhah Rural District, in the Central District of Sarvabad County, Kurdistan Province, Iran. At the 2006 census, its population was 245, in 47 families. The village is populated by Kurds.
