= Khoshkin =

Khoshkin خشكين
- Village
- Location within Iran
- Coordinates: 35°24′17″N 46°15′05″E
- Country: Iran
- Province: Kurdistan
- County: Sarvabad
- Bakhsh: Central
- Rural District: Dezli

Population (2006)
  - Total: 118
- Time zone: UTC+3:30 (IRST)
  - Summer (DST): UTC+4:30 (IRDT)

Khoshkin (Persian: خشكين, also Romanized as Khoshkīn; also known as Khoshkin Marivan, Khowshgen, Khowshkīn, Khvoshkīn, Vashkhar, Veshkīn, and Vishkīn) is a village in Dezli Rural District, in the Central District of Sarvabad County, Kurdistan Province, Iran. At the 2006 census, its population was 118, in 24 families. The village is populated by Kurds.
