= Dorud, Kurdistan =

Dorud دورود
- Village
- Location within Iran
- Coordinates: 35°18′06″N 46°21′10″E
- Country: Iran
- Province: Kurdistan
- County: Sarvabad
- Bakhsh: Central
- Rural District: Razab

Population (2006)
  - Total: 489
- Time zone: UTC+3:30 (IRST)
  - Summer (DST): UTC+4:30 (IRDT)

Dorud (Persian: دورود, also Romanized as Dorūd, Do Rūd, Dow Rūd, and Durud; also known as Dorūd-e Soflá) is a village in Razab Rural District, in the Central District of Sarvabad County, Kurdistan Province, Iran. At the 2006 census, its population was 489, in 111 families. The village is populated by Kurds.
