= Ravar, Kurdistan =

Ravar روار
- Village
- Country: Iran
- Province: Kurdistan
- County: Sarvabad
- Bakhsh: Central
- Rural District: Zherizhah

Population (2006)
  - Total: 277
- Time zone: UTC+3:30 (IRST)
  - Summer (DST): UTC+4:30 (IRDT)

Ravar (Persian: روار, also Romanized as Ravār; Sorani Kurdish: ڕووار, romanized: R̄uwar) is a village in Zherizhah Rural District, in the Central District of Sarvabad County, Kurdistan Province, Iran. At the 2006 census, its population was 277, in 65 families. The village is populated by Kurds.
