= Niabad =

Nai abad ني آباد
- Village
- Location within Iran
- Coordinates: 35°14′43″N 46°27′36″E
- Country: Iran
- Province: Kurdistan
- County: Sarvabad
- Bakhsh: Central
- Rural District: Razab

Population (2006)
  - Total: 408
- Time zone: UTC+3:30 (IRST)
  - Summer (DST): UTC+4:30 (IRDT)

Naibad (Persian: ني آباد, also Romanized as Nīābād and Neyābād; also known as Niāwa and Nīvā) is a village in Razab Rural District, in the Central District of Sarvabad County, Kurdistan Province, Iran. At the 2006 census, its population was 408, in 95 families. The village is populated by Kurds.
