= Zum, Iran =

Zum زوم
- Village
- Location within Iran
- Coordinates: 35°08′46″N 46°26′39″E
- Country: Iran
- Province: Kurdistan
- County: Sarvabad
- Bakhsh: Central
- Rural District: Zherizhah

Population (2006)
  - Total: 108
- Time zone: UTC+3:30 (IRST)
  - Summer (DST): UTC+4:30 (IRDT)

Zum (Persian: زوم, also Romanized as Zūm; also known as Zoh and Zūh) is a village in Zherizhah Rural District, in the Central District of Sarvabad County, Kurdistan Province, Iran. At the 2006 census, its population was 108, in 19 families. The village is populated by Kurds.
