= Garabad =

Garabad or Garrabad (Persian: گَر آباد) may refer to:

- Garabad, Hamadan
- Garabad, Kurdistan
- Garabad, Sarvabad, Kurdistan Province
