= Cheshmidar =

Cheshmidar چشمیدر
- Village
- Location within Iran
- Coordinates: 35°09′58″N 46°32′13″E
- Country: Iran
- Province: Kurdistan
- County: Sarvabad
- Bakhsh: Central
- Rural District: Paygelan

Population (2006)
  - Total: 1,273
- Time zone: UTC+3:30 (IRST)
  - Summer (DST): UTC+4:30 (IRDT)

Cheshmidar (Persian: چشمیدر, also Romanized as Cheshmīdar, Chashmīdar, and Chashmīdor; also known as Chashmeh Dar) is a village in Paygelan Rural District, in the Central District of Sarvabad County, Kurdistan Province, Iran. At the 2006 census, its population was 1,273, in 308 families. The village is populated by Kurds.
