= Zherizhah =

Village in Kurdistan province, Iran

Zherizhah Persian: ژريژه
- Village
- Location within Iran Location within Iran Kurdistan
- Coordinates: 35°09′01″N 46°31′21″E
- Country: Iran
- Province: Kurdistan
- County: Sarvabad
- District: Central
- Rural District: Zherizhah

Population (2016)
  - Total: 183
- Time zone: UTC+3:30 (IRST)

Zherizhah (Persian: ژريژه) (Note: Also romanized as Zherīzhah and Zherīzheh; also known as Zhelīzheh) is a village in, and the capital of, Zherizhah Rural District of the Central District of Sarvabad County, Kurdistan province, Iran.

== Demographics ==
=== Ethnicity ===
The village is populated by Kurds.

=== Population ===
At the time of the 2006 National Census, the village's population was 510 in 133 households. The following census in 2011 counted 339 people in 95 households. The 2016 census measured the population of the village as 183 people in 65 households.
