= Dezvand-e Sofla =

Dezavand-e Sofla دزوندسفلي
- Village
- Location within Iran
- Coordinates: 35°05′58″N 46°33′27″E
- Country: Iran
- Province: Kurdistan
- County: Sarvabad
- Bakhsh: Central
- Rural District: Zherizhah

Population (2006)
  - Total: 75
- Time zone: UTC+3:30 (IRST)
  - Summer (DST): UTC+4:30 (IRDT)

Dezavand-e Sofla (Persian: دزوندسفلي, also Romanized as Dezvand-e Soflá; also known as Dezāvand-e Pā’īn, Dezāvand-e Soflá, Dezeh Vand, Dezvand-e Pā’īn, Dīzawān, and Dīzeh Vand) is a village in Zherizhah Rural District, in the Central District of Sarvabad County, Kurdistan Province, Iran. At the 2006 census, its population was 75, in 21 families. The village is populated by Kurds.
