= Degagah, Sarvabad =

Degagah دگاگاه
- Village
- Location within Iran
- Coordinates: 35°13′42″N 46°26′53″E
- Country: Iran
- Province: Kurdistan
- County: Sarvabad
- Bakhsh: Central
- Rural District: Razab

Population (2006)
  - Total: 1,061
- Time zone: UTC+3:30 (IRST)
  - Summer (DST): UTC+4:30 (IRDT)

Degagah (Persian: دگاگاه, also Romanized as Degāgāh; also known as Dagāgā, Degāgā, and Deqāqeh) is a village in Razab Rural District, in the Central District of Sarvabad County, Kurdistan Province, Iran. At the 2006 census, its population was 1,061, in 267 families. The village is populated by Kurds.
