= Govaz =

Govaz گواز
- Village
- Location within Iran
- Coordinates: 35°06′35″N 46°39′20″E
- Country: Iran
- Province: Kurdistan
- County: Sarvabad
- Bakhsh: Central
- Rural District: Paygelan

Population (2006)
  - Total: 707
- Time zone: UTC+3:30 (IRST)
  - Summer (DST): UTC+4:30 (IRDT)

Govaz (Persian: گواز, also Romanized as Govāz and Gavāz; also known as Jū-ye Ās and Ju yi As) is a village in Paygelan Rural District, in the Central District of Sarvabad County, Kurdistan Province, Iran. At the 2006 census, its population was 707, in 160 families. The village is populated by Kurds.
