= Dorood =

Dorood or Dorud or Dow Rud (Persian: دورود) may refer to:

- Deh Rud, Fars
- Dorud, Kurdistan
- Dorood (city), Lorestan, Iran
- Dorud County, Lorestan, Iran
- Dorud, West Azerbaijan
- Dorud, alternate name of Dorudgaran
- Oil field offshore in Kharg Island

== See also ==
- Darrud
