= Razab =

Village in Kurdistan province, Iran

Razab Persian: رزاب
- Village
- Location within Iran Location within Iran Kurdistan
- Coordinates: 35°15′35″N 46°24′15″E
- Country: Iran
- Province: Kurdistan
- County: Sarvabad
- District: Central
- Rural District: Razab

Population (2016)
  - Total: 669
- Time zone: UTC+3:30 (IRST)

Razab (Persian: رزاب) (Note: Also romanized as Razāb) is a village in, and the capital of, Razab Rural District of the Central District of Sarvabad County, Kurdistan province, Iran.

== Demographics ==
=== Ethnicity ===
The village is populated by Kurds.

=== Population ===
At the time of the 2006 National Census, the village's population was 755 in 172 households. The following census in 2011 counted 716 people in 203 households. The 2016 census measured the population of the village as 669 people in 201 households.
