= NAO =

NAO or nao may refer to:

== Organisations ==
- National Academy Orchestra of Canada, a Canadian training orchestra
- National Adhering Organizations, organisations for chemistry
- National Applications Office, a former program of the United States Department of Homeland Security
- National Audit Office (disambiguation), in several nations
- Nautical Almanac Office (disambiguation)
  - HM Nautical Almanac Office, in the United Kingdom
  - Nautical Almanac Office, at the United States Naval Observatory
- New Age Outlaws, a wrestling tag team

== Science and technology ==
- Sodium oxide (NaO)
- Nonyl Acridine Orange, a fluorescent dye. It can stain cardiolipin content of mitochondria.
- North Atlantic oscillation, a climatic phenomenon
- Nao (robot), a humanoid robot developed by Aldebaran Robotics
- 13221 Nao, an asteroid

== People ==
- Nao (given name), a Japanese given name
- Nao (singer), a United Kingdom music artist

== Places ==
- Näo, a village in Estonia
- Nao, Iran, a village in Kurdistan Province
- Nenets Autonomous Okrug, a federal subdivision of Russia

== Other uses ==
- Carrack, a sailing ship known as a nao in Spanish
- Nanchong Gaoping Airport (IATA code), an airport in China
- Nao (musical instrument) (鐃), see List of Chinese musical instruments
- Nao, a fictional character in the Aquablue comic
- Nao Porcelain, a brand owned by Lladro
