= Daraki =

Daraki (Persian: دركي) may refer to:

- Daraki, Kurdistan
- Daraki, South Khorasan
