= Zalkeh, Sarvabad =

Zalkeh ذلكه
- Village
- Location within Iran
- Coordinates: 35°24′08″N 46°13′03″E
- Country: Iran
- Province: Kurdistan
- County: Sarvabad
- Bakhsh: Central
- Rural District: Dezli

Population (2006)
  - Total: 159
- Time zone: UTC+3:30 (IRST)
  - Summer (DST): UTC+4:30 (IRDT)

Zalkeh (Persian: ذلكه, also Romanized as Z̄alkeh and Zelkeh; also known as Zalkeh Oraman Takht and Zilkeh) is a village in Dezli Rural District, in the Central District of Sarvabad County, Kurdistan Province, Iran. At the 2006 census, its population was 159, in 31 families. The village is populated by Kurds.
