= Nasl, Kurdistan =

Nasl نسل
- Village
- Location within Iran
- Coordinates: 35°17′43″N 46°26′07″E
- Country: Iran
- Province: Kurdistan
- County: Sarvabad
- Bakhsh: Central
- Rural District: Razab

Population (2006)
  - Total: 746
- Time zone: UTC+3:30 (IRST)
  - Summer (DST): UTC+4:30 (IRDT)

Nasl (Persian: نسل, also Romanized as Nesel) is a village in Razab Rural District, in the Central District of Sarvabad County, Kurdistan Province, Iran. At the 2006 census, its population was 746, in 176 families. The village is populated by Kurds.
