= Gushkhani =

Village in Kurdistan province, Iran

Gushkhani Persian: گۆشخانی
- Village
- Location within Iran Location within Iran Kurdistan
- Coordinates: 35°17′16″N 46°25′49″E
- Country: Iran
- Province: Kurdistan
- County: Sarvabad
- District: Central
- Rural District: Razab

Population (2016)
  - Total: 968
- Time zone: UTC+3:30 (IRST)

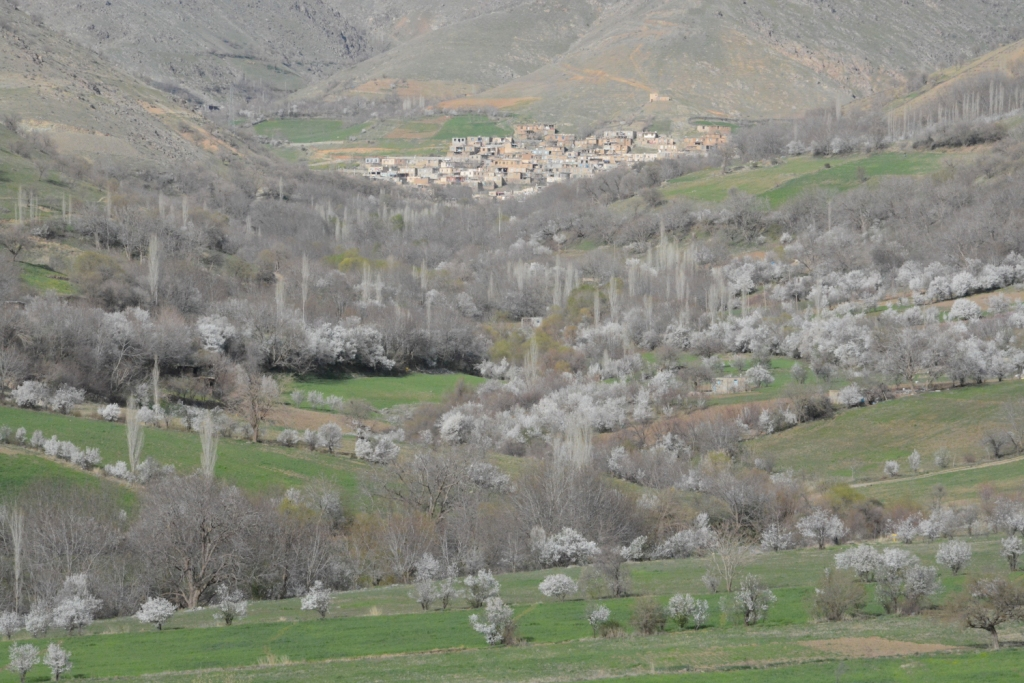
Gushkhani in springtime

Gushkhani (Persian: گوشخانی) (Note: Sorani Kurdish: گۆشخانی, also romanized as Gūshkhānī; also known as Goshkhāneh and Qoshkhāneh) is a village in Razab Rural District of the Central District of Sarvabad County, Kurdistan province, Iran.

== Demographics ==
=== Ethnicity ===
The village is populated by Kurds.

=== Population ===
At the time of the 2006 National Census, the village's population was 1,107 in 289 households. The following census in 2011 counted 1,107 people in 324 households. The 2016 census measured the population of the village as 968 people in 290 households. It was the most populous village in its rural district.
