= Aryan, Kurdistan =

Aryan آريان
- Village
- Location within Iran
- Coordinates: 35°08′44″N 46°33′44″E
- Country: Iran
- Province: Kurdistan
- County: Sarvabad
- Bakhsh: Central
- Rural District: Paygelan

Population (2006)
  - Total: 489
- Time zone: UTC+3:30 (IRST)
  - Summer (DST): UTC+4:30 (IRDT)

Aryan (Persian: آريان, also Romanized as Āryān, Āriyān, and Aryān) is a village in Paygelan Rural District, in the Central District of Sarvabad County, Kurdistan Province, Iran. At the 2006 census, its population was 489, in 119 families. The linguistic composition of the village is roughly 75% Hawrami-speaking and 25% Sorani-speaking.
