= Tarkhanabad, Sarvabad =

Tarkhanabad ترخان آباد
- Village
- Location within Iran
- Coordinates: 35°18′22″N 46°23′05″E
- Country: Iran
- Province: Kurdistan
- County: Sarvabad
- Bakhsh: Central
- Rural District: Razab

Population (2006)
  - Total: 612
- Time zone: UTC+3:30 (IRST)
  - Summer (DST): UTC+4:30 (IRDT)

Tarkhanabad (Persian: ترخان آباد, also Romanized as Tarkhānābād; also known as Tarkhānāwa) is a village in Razab Rural District, in the Central District of Sarvabad County, Kurdistan Province, Iran. At the 2006 census, its population was 612, in 152 families. The village is populated by Kurds.
