= ZUM =

ZUM may refer to:

- Churchill Falls Airport
- Z User Meeting
- Zimbabwe Unity Movement
- Zone Usage Measurement
- Zum (app)
- Züm bus rapid transit in Brampton, Ontario, Canada

== Places ==
- Zum, Iran, a village in Kurdistan Province
