= Dezli, Kurdistan =

Village in Kurdistan province, Iran

Dezli Persian: دزلی
- Village
- Location within Iran Location within Iran Kurdistan
- Coordinates: 35°22′28″N 46°08′45″E
- Country: Iran
- Province: Kurdistan
- County: Sarvabad
- District: Central
- Rural District: Dezli

Population (2016)
  - Total: 2,733
- Time zone: UTC+3:30 (IRST)

Dezli (Persian: دزلی) (Note: Also Romanized as Dezlī; also known as Dizleh) is a village in, and the capital of, Dezli Rural District of the Central District of Sarvabad County, Kurdistan province, Iran.

== Demographics ==
=== Ethnicity ===
The village is populated by Gorani speaking Kurds.

=== Population ===
At the time of the 2006 National Census, the village's population was 2,627 in 585 households. The following census in 2011 counted 2,731 people in 688 households. The 2016 census measured the population of the village as 2,733 people in 827 households. It was the most populous village in its rural district.
