= Zhan, Iran =

Zhan (Persian: ژان) in Iran may refer to:

- Zhan, Kurdistan
- Zhan, Lorestan
- Zhan Rural District, in Lorestan Province

== See also ==
- Zan, Iran (disambiguation)
