= Bisaran =

Village in Kurdistan province, Iran

Bisaran Persian: بيساران
- Village
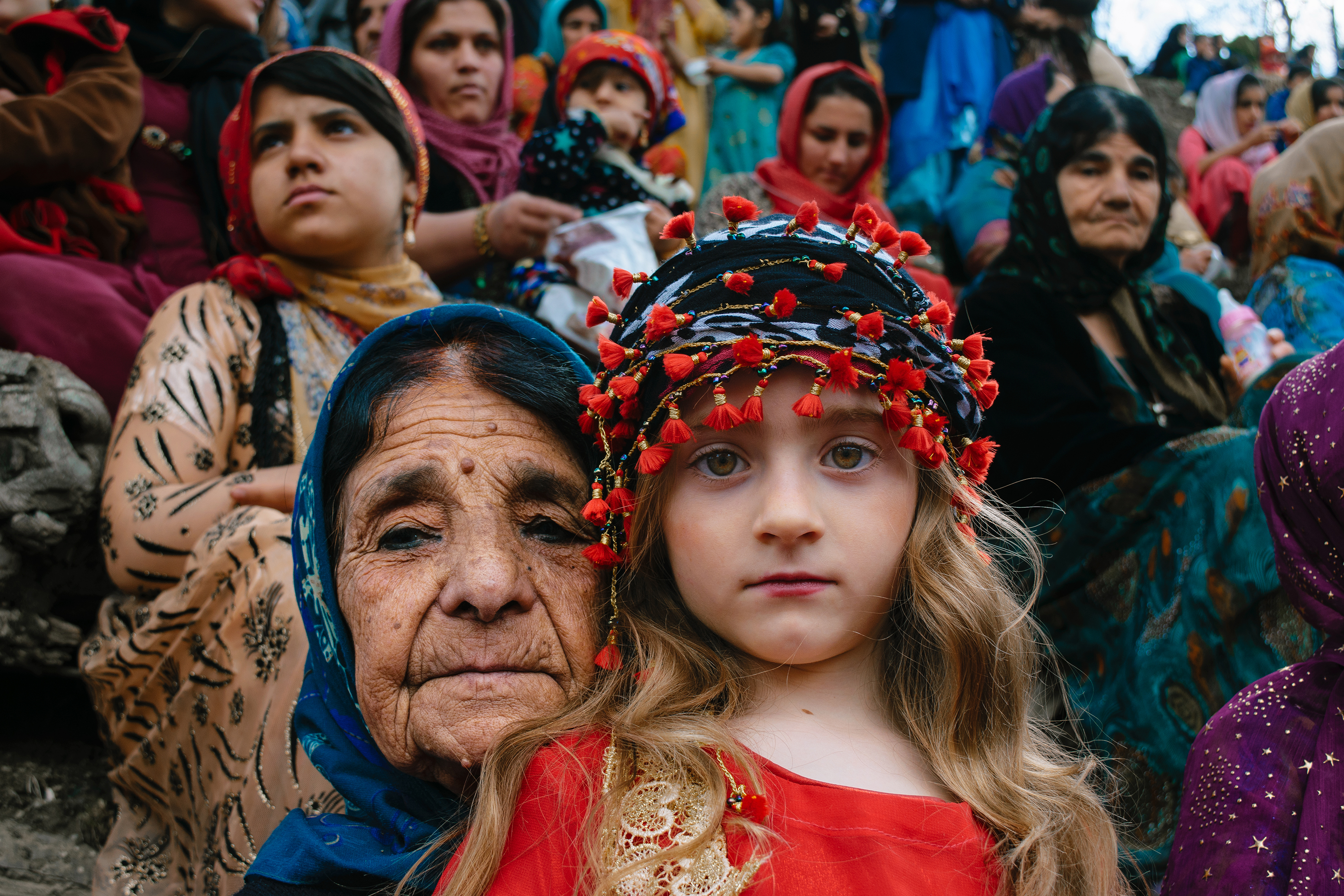
- Kurdish family in Bisaran

- Location within Iran Location within Iran Kurdistan
- Coordinates: 35°11′35″N 46°38′45″E
- Country: Iran
- Province: Kurdistan
- County: Sarvabad
- District: Central
- Rural District: Bisaran

Population (2016)
  - Total: 2,727
- Time zone: UTC+3:30 (IRST)

Bisaran or Besaran (Kurdish: بێساران, romanized: Bêsaran, Persian: بيساران) (Note: Also romanized as Beysāran and Bīsārān; also known as Bhasran) is a village in, and the capital of, Bisaran Rural District of the Central District of Sarvabad County, Kurdistan province, Iran.

== Demographics ==
The village is populated by Kurds.

=== Population ===
At the time of the 2006 National Census, the village's population was 3,130 in 745 households. The following census in 2011 counted 2,819 people in 774 households. The 2016 census measured the population of the village as 2,727 people in 804 households. It was the most populous village in its rural district.
