= Niva =

Niva or NIVA can refer to:

== Places ==
- Niva (river) in the Murmansk Oblast, Russia
- Nivå, a town in Denmark
- Nivå station, railway station in Denmark
- Niva (Prostějov District), a village in the Czech Republic
- Niva, Iran, a village in Kurdistan Province, Iran

== Other ==
- Lada Niva (VAZ 2121) and Chevrolet Niva (VAZ 2123), a Russian off-road vehicle
- Niva (newspaper), a Polish weekly newspaper in the Belarusian language
- Niva (magazine), a popular 19th-century Russian magazine
- National Independent Venue Association, an organization of independent music venues
- Norwegian Institute for Water Research (NIVA)
- NIVA XM1970 assault rifle prototype
- Niva International School
- Niva, a Czech blue cheese
