= Zalakeh =

Zalakeh or Zalkeh or Zalekeh (Persian: ذالكه), also known as Dalakeh, may refer to:

- Zalakeh-ye Farajollah-e Montazeri
- Zalakeh-ye Hajj Abbas Qoli
- Zalakeh-ye Vaziri
