= Vishkin =

Vishkin may refer to:

- Uzi Vishkin
- Vishkin, Iran
