= Zan, Iran =

Zan (Persian: زان) in Iran may refer to:

- Zan, Kurdistan
- Zan, Lorestan
- Zan, Tehran

== See also ==
- Zhan, Iran (disambiguation)
