= Zhivar, Kurdistan =

Village in Kurdistan province, Iran

Zhivar Persian: ژيوار
- Village
- Location within Iran Location within Iran Kurdistan
- Coordinates: 35°14′29″N 46°19′26″E
- Country: Iran
- Province: Kurdistan
- County: Sarvabad
- District: Uraman
- Rural District: Shalyar

Population (2016)
  - Total: 1,282
- Time zone: UTC+3:30 (IRST)

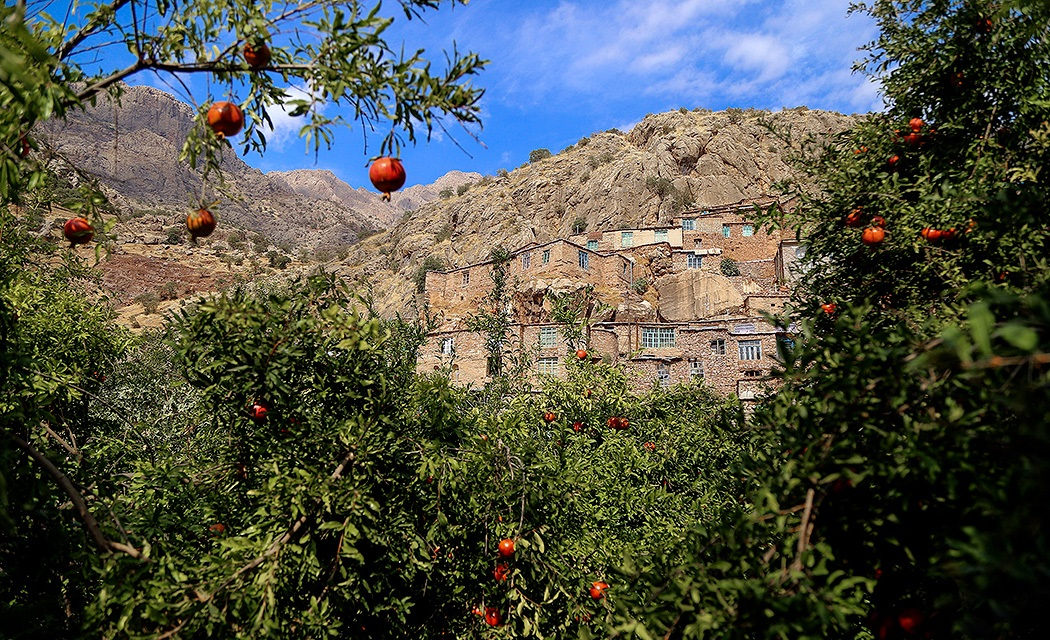
Pomegranate grove in the village of Zhivar, Kurdistan Province

Zhivar (Persian: ژيوار) (Note: Also romanized as Zhīvār; also known as Zewār and Zhīvān; Sorani Kurdish: ژیوار, romanized as Jîwar) is a village in Shalyar Rural District of Uraman District, Sarvabad County, Kurdistan province, Iran.

== Demographics ==
=== Ethnicity ===
The village is populated by Kurds.

=== Population ===
At the time of the 2006 National Census, the village's population was 1,764 in 352 households. The following census in 2011 counted 1,563 people in 360 households. The 2016 census measured the population of the village as 1,282 people in 328 households. It was the most populous village in its rural district.
