= Dagaga =

Dagaga may refer to:

- Degagah, several places in Iran
- Fataluku language, in
