= Daraki, Kurdistan =

Village in Kurdistan province, Iran

Daraki Persian: درکی
- Village
- Location within Iran Location within Iran Kurdistan
- Coordinates: 35°19′10″N 46°11′51″E
- Country: Iran
- Province: Kurdistan
- County: Sarvabad
- District: Central
- Rural District: Kusalan

Population (2016)
  - Total: 1,540
- Time zone: UTC+3:30 (IRST)

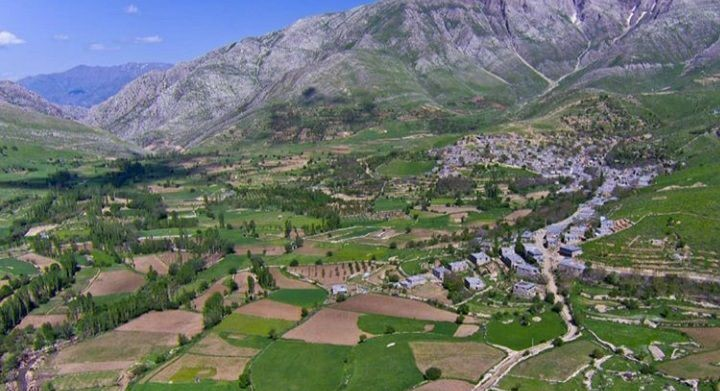
Daraki village in Kurdistan

Daraki (Persian: درکی) (Note: Also romanized as Darakī; also known as Darreh Kī) is a village in Kusalan Rural District (Note: Formerly Sarvabad Rural District) of the Central District of Sarvabad County, Kurdistan province, Iran.

== Demographics ==
=== Ethnicity ===
The village is populated by Kurds.

=== Population ===
At the time of the 2006 National Census, the village's population was 1,643 in 343 households. The following census in 2011 counted 1,794 people in 425 households. The 2016 census measured the population of the village as 1,540 people in 490 households. It was the most populous village in its rural district.
