= Grandparent =

Parent of one's parents

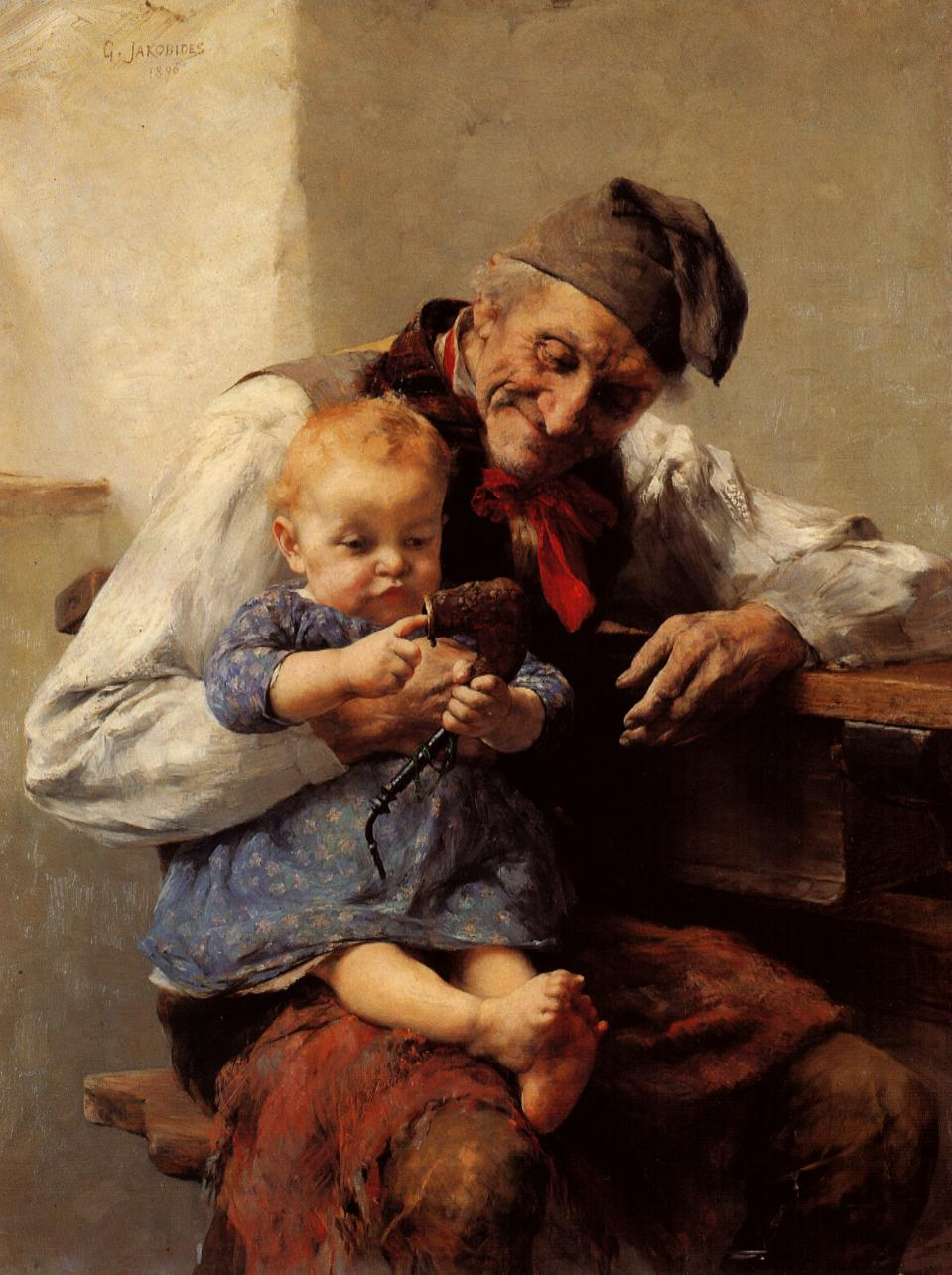
The Favorite – Grandfather and Grandson, by Georgios Jakobides (1890)

Grandparents, individually known as grandmother and grandfather, or Grandma and Grandpa, are the parents of a person's father or mother – paternal or maternal. Every sexually reproducing living organism who is not a genetic chimera has a maximum of 4 genetic grandparents, 8 genetic great-grandparents, 16 genetic great-great-grandparents, 32 genetic great-great-great-grandparents, 64 genetic great-great-great-great-grandparents, etc. In the history of modern humanity, around 30,000 years ago, the number of modern humans who lived to be a grandparent increased. It is not known for certain what spurred this increase in longevity, but it is generally believed that a key consequence of three generations being alive together was the preservation of information which could otherwise have been lost; an example of this important information might have been where to find water in times of drought.

In cases where parents are unwilling or unable to provide adequate care for their children (e.g., financial obstacles, marriage problems, illness or death), grandparents often take on the role of primary caregivers. Even when this is not the case, and particularly in traditional cultures, grandparents often have a direct and clear role in relation to the raising, care and nurture of children. Grandparents are second-degree relatives to their grandchildren and share 25% genetic overlap.

A step-grandparent can be the step-parent of the parent or the step-parent's parent or the step-parent's step-parent (though technically this might be called a step-step-grandparent). The various words for grandparents at times may also be used to refer to any elderly person, especially the terms gramps, granny, grandfather, granddad, grandmother, nan, maw-maw, paw-paw (and others which families make up themselves).

== Titles ==
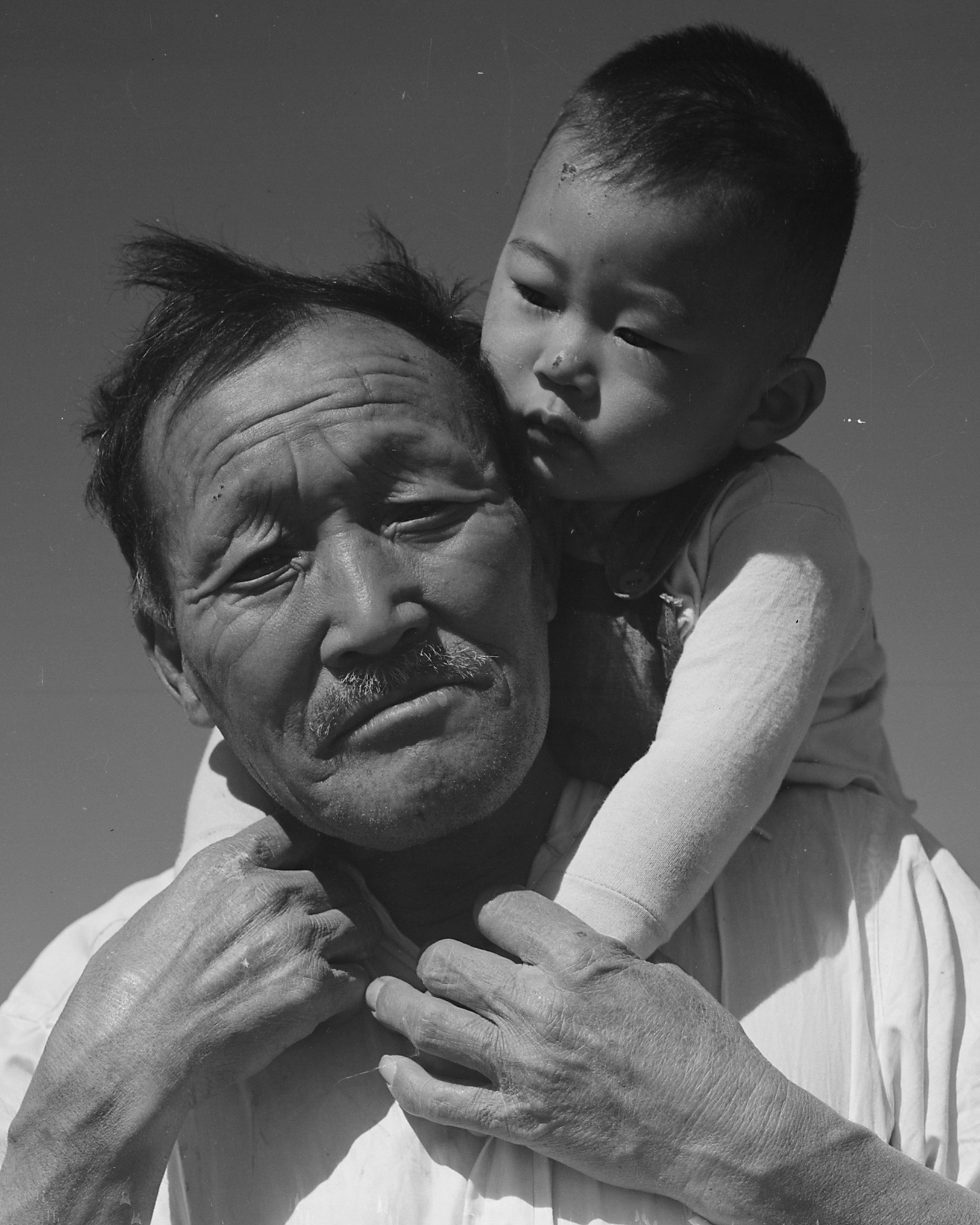
A grandfather holding his grandson by Dorothea Lange

When used as a noun (e.g., "... a grandparent walked by"), grandfather and grandmother are usually used, although forms such as grandma/grandpa, granny/granddaddy or even nan/pop are sometimes used. When preceded by "my ..." (e.g., "... my grandpa walked by"), all forms are common (anywhere from "... my grandfather ..." to "... my Gramps ..."). All forms can be used in plural, but Gramps (plural Gramps) is rare.

In writing, Grandfather and Grandmother are most common, but very rare as a form of address. In speech, Grandpa and Grandma are commonly used in the United States, Canada, and Australia. In Britain, Ireland, United States, Australia, New Zealand and, particularly prevalent in the Canadian province of Newfoundland and Labrador and English-speaking Quebecers, Nan, Nana, Nanna, Nanny, Gran and Granny and other variations are often used for grandmother in both writing and speech.

In Bangladesh, Pakistan, and many parts of India, maternal grandparents are called Nana and Nani. Similarly, paternal grandparents are called Dada and Dadi. One's parents' maternal grandparents are called Par-nani and Par-nana. On similar lines, parents' paternal grandparents are called Par-dadi and Par-dada.

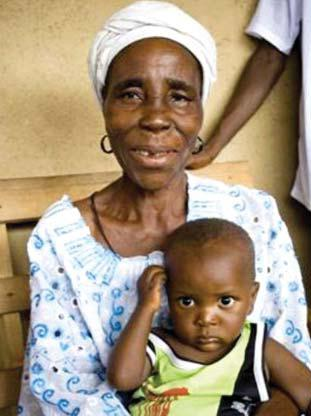
A grandmother taking a nutrition class with her grandson

Numerous other variants exist, such as Granny, for grandmother. Gogo may be used for either.

Given that people may have two living sets of grandparents, some confusion arises from calling two people "grandma" or "grandpa", so often two of the other terms listed above are used for one set of grandparents. Another common solution is to call grandparents by their first names ("Grandpa George", "Grandma Anne", etc.) or by their family names ("Grandpa Jones", "Grandma Smith"). In North America, many families call one set of grandparents by their ethnic names (e.g., Hispanic grandparents might be called abuelo and abuela or "abuelito" and "abuelita", French grandparents might be called papi and mamie, Italian grandparents might be called nonno and nonna, or Dutch and German grandparents might be called Opa and Oma. In Flanders pepee or petje and memee or metje are most used). In Friesland, a common pair is pake and beppe. Northern Chinese people often use laolao and laoye, while Mandarin-speaking Southerners often use wài pó (外婆, mother's mother) and wài gōng (外公, mother's father), to refer to maternal grandparents; paternal grandparents usually are called nǎi nai (奶奶, father's mother) and yé yé (爷爷, father's father). In the Philippines, grandparents are called lolo (grandfather) and lola (grandmother).

Languages and cultures with more specific kinship terminology than English may distinguish between paternal grandparents and maternal grandparents. For example, in the Swedish language there is no single word for "grandmother"; the mother's mother is termed mormor and the father's mother is termed farmor. However, the other Scandinavian languages, Danish and Norwegian, use words which specify the kinship like in Swedish (identically spelled among all three languages), as well as using common terms similar to grandmother (Danish: bedstemor, Norwegian: bestemor).

== Great-grandparents and beyond ==
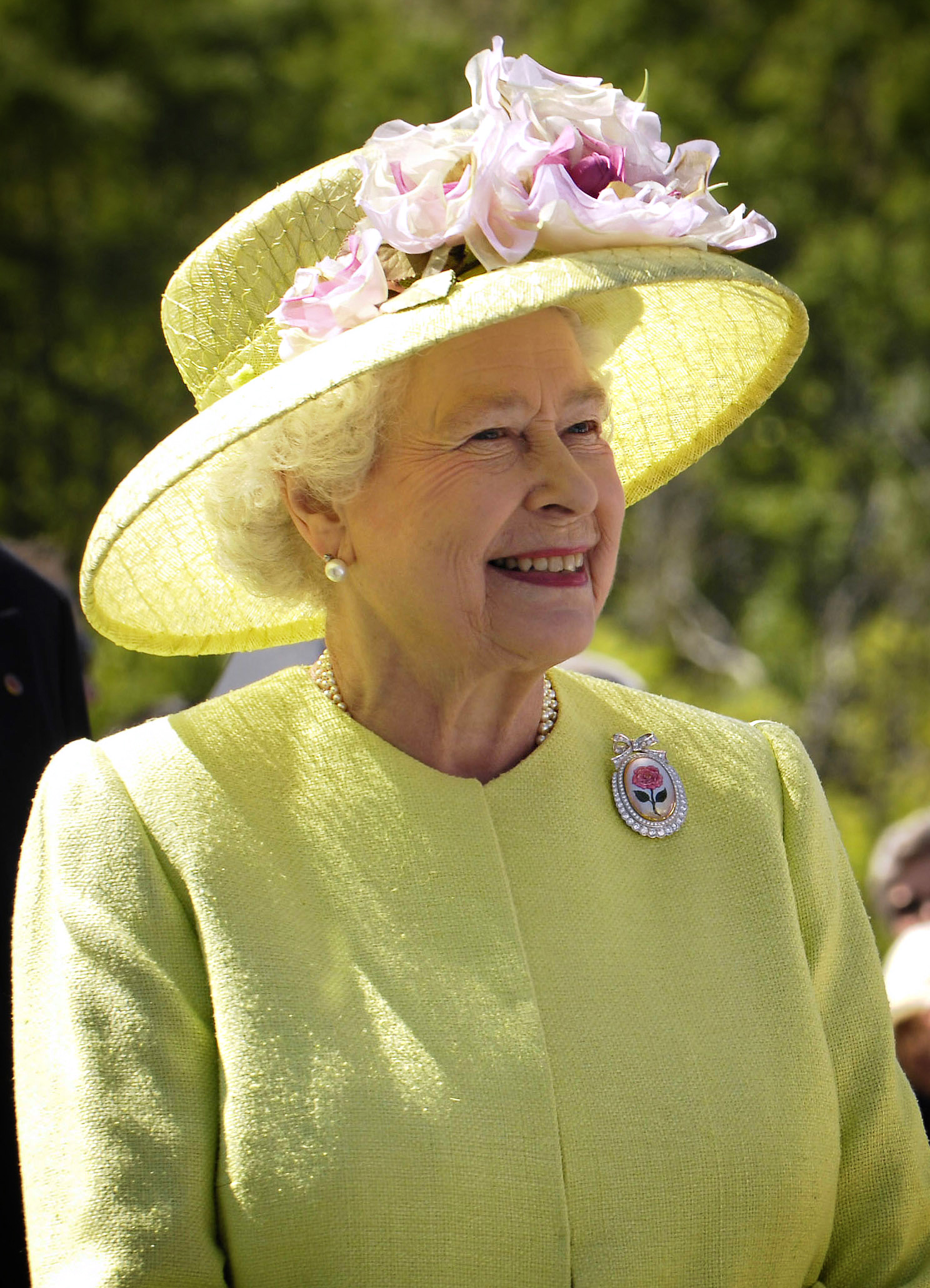
Queen Elizabeth II was the grandmother of 8 and the great-grandmother of 14.

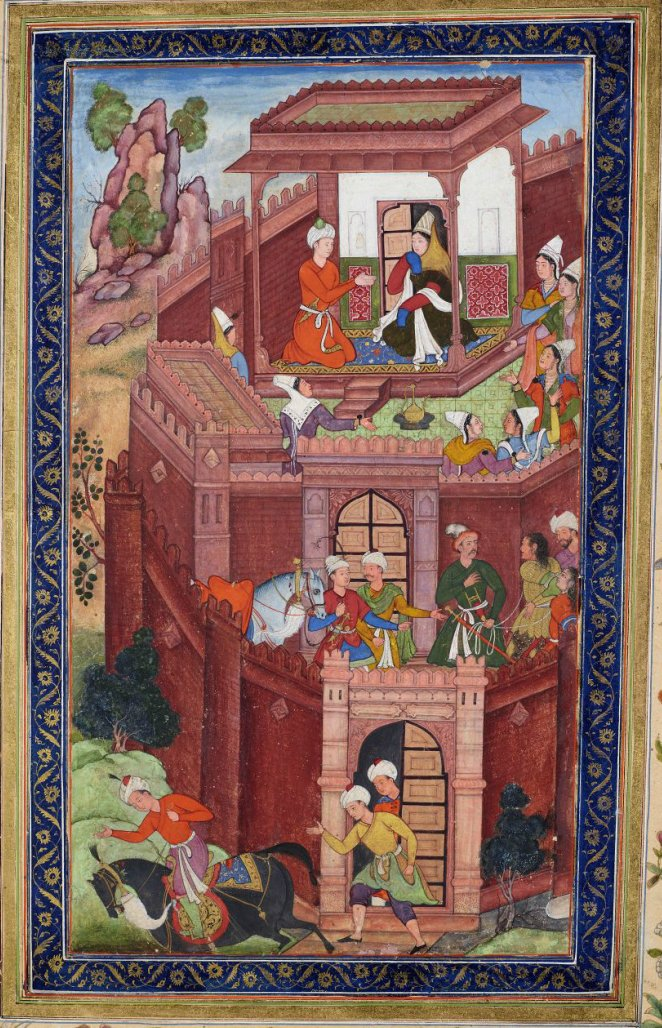
Timurid conqueror Babur seeks the advice of his grandmother.

The parents of a grandparent, or the grandparents of a parent, are called the same names as grandparents (grandfather/-mother, grandpa/-ma, granddad/-mom, etc.) with the prefix great- added, with an additional great- added for each additional generation. One's great-grandparent's parents would be "great-great-grandparents".

To avoid a proliferation of "greats" when discussing genealogical trees, one may also use ordinals instead of multiple "greats"; thus a "great-great-grandfather" would be the "second great-grandfather", and a "great-great-great-grandfather" would be a third great-grandfather, and so on. One may also use cardinal numbers for numbering greats, for example, great-great-great-grandmother becomes 3×-great-grandmother.

Individuals who share the same great-grandparents but are not siblings or first cousins are "second cousins" to each other, as second cousins have grandparents who are siblings. Similarly, "third cousins" would have great-grandparents who are siblings, and "fourth cousins" would have great-great-grandparents who are siblings.

== Etymology ==
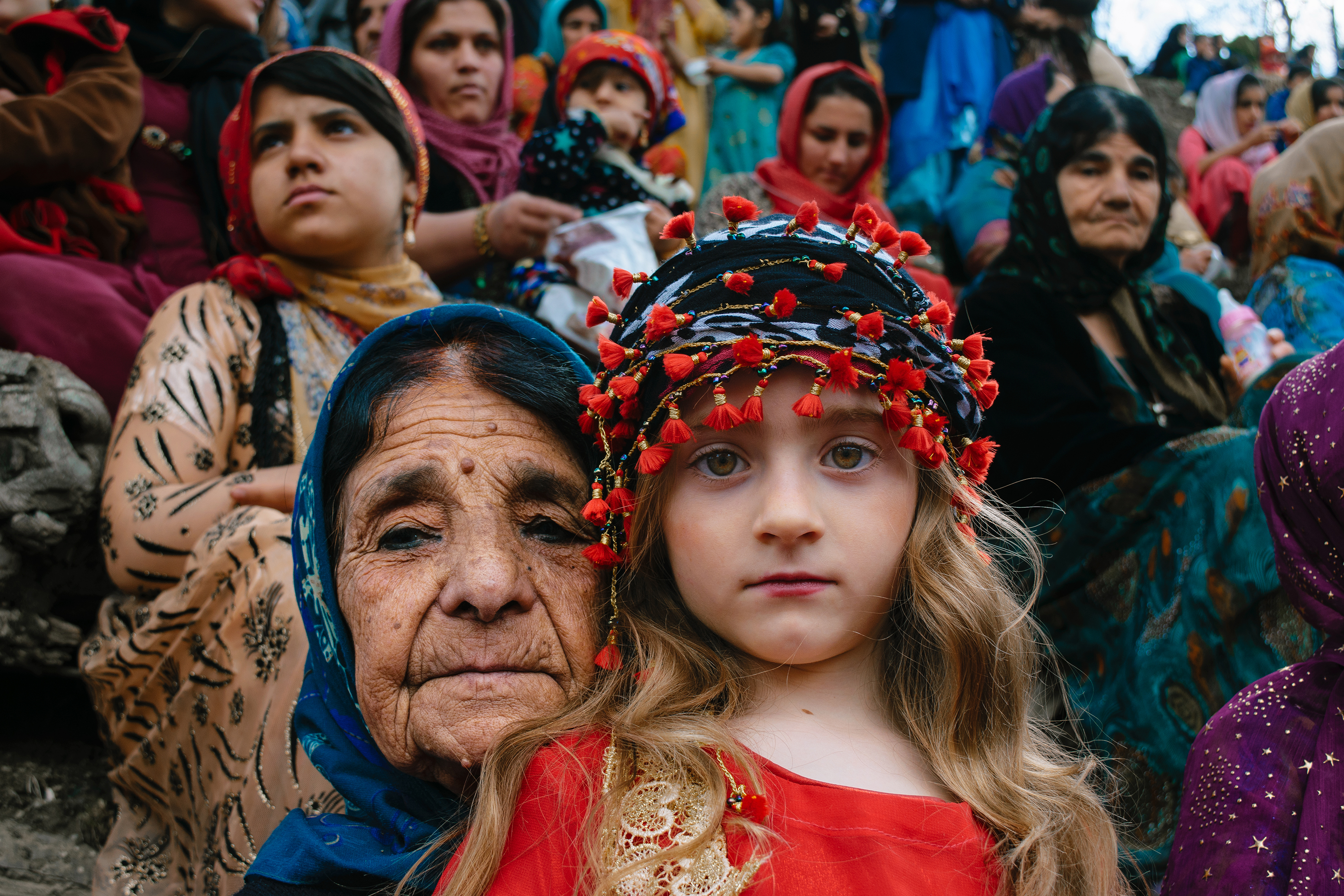
Kurdish family in Bisaran, Iran

The use of the name element grand- is first recorded in the early 13th century, from the Anglo-French graunt, then + parent / mother / father / sire, etc. later on, which perhaps are modeled on Latin avunculus magnus "great uncle". However, the placement of the adjective grand before the noun, which is obligatory in French (except for un homme grand which means "a tall man" as opposed to un grand homme "a great man"), does not support this explanation. The prefix great- represents a direct translation of Anglo-French graunt to English. In Old English, the prefixes ealde- (old) and ieldra- (elder) were used (ealdefæder/-mōdor and ieldrafæder/-mōdor). A great-grandfather was called a þridda fæder (third father), a great-great-grandfather a fēowerða fæder (fourth father), etc.

=== Variation ===
- maternal grandmother- mother's mother.
- maternal grandfather- mother's father.
- paternal grandmother- father's mother.
- paternal grandfather- father's father.

== Involvement in childcare ==
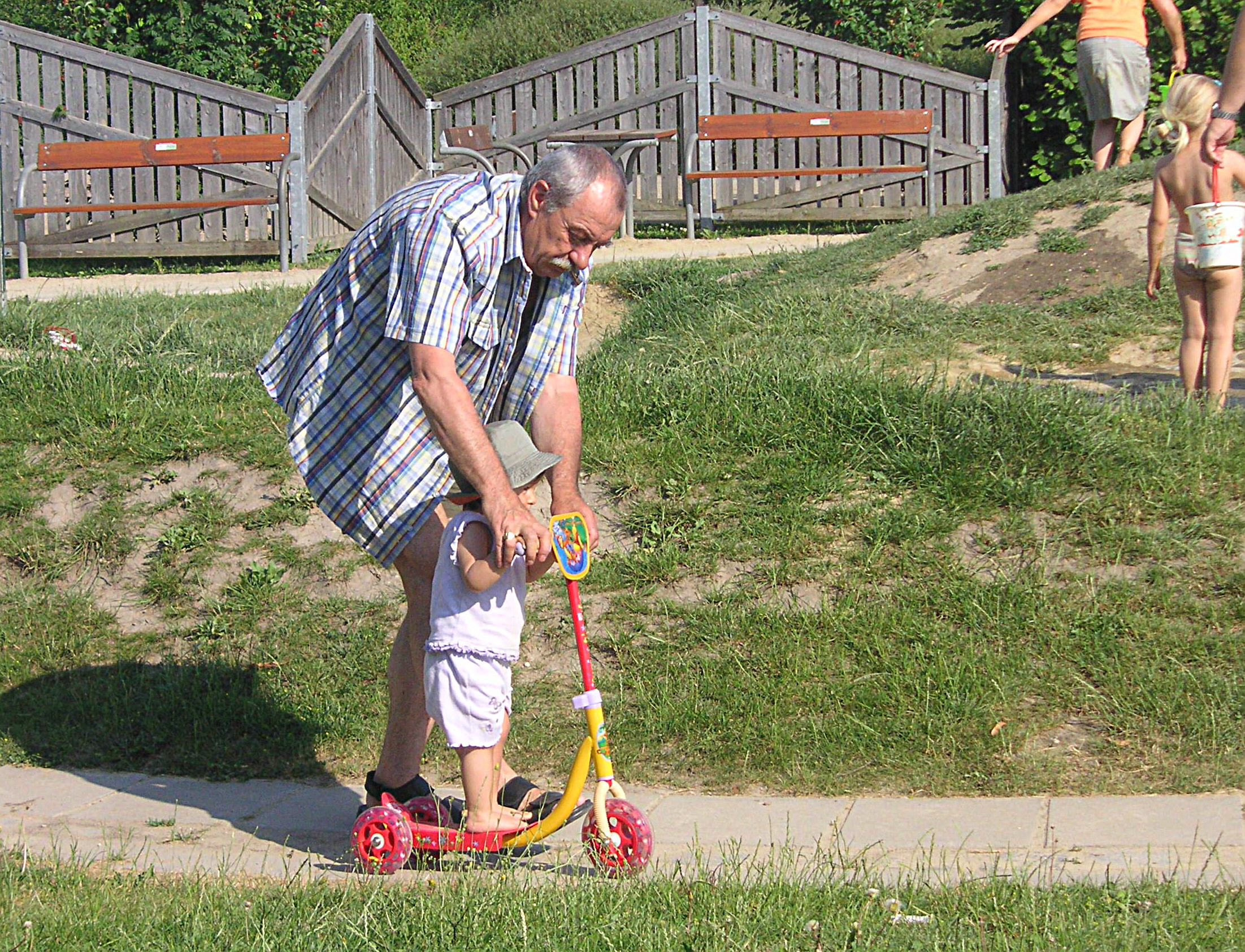
A grandfather teaching his granddaughter to use a kick scooter

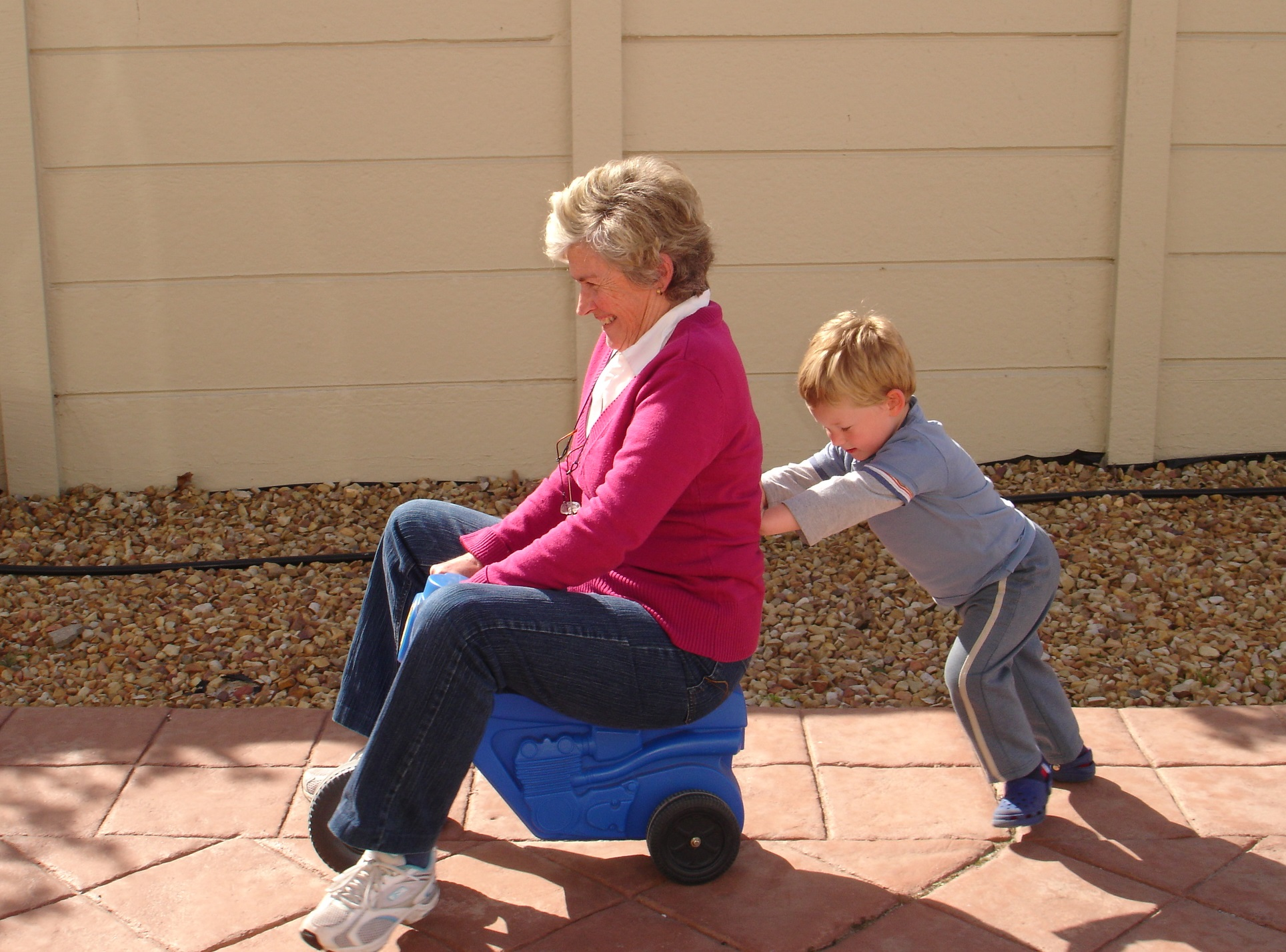
A grandmother playing with her grandson

Grandparents are changing their roles in contemporary world, especially as they are becoming increasingly involved in childcare. According to a 2012 study based on 2010 census and survey data, around 10% of children in the U.S. live in a household including a grandparent. Of these, approximately a third live in a household consisting of two parents and a grandparent. Likewise, more than 40% of grandparents across 11 European countries care for their grandchildren in the absence of the parents. In Britain, around 63% of grandparents care for their grandchildren who are under 16 years old. Grandparent involvement is also common in Eastern societies. For instance, 48% of grandparents in Hong Kong reported that they are taking care of their grandchildren. In China, around 58% of Chinese grandparents who are aged 45 or older are involved in childcare. In Singapore, 40% of children from birth to three years old are cared by their grandparents and this percentage is still increasing. In South Korea, 53% of children under the age of 6 years old are cared by their grandparents. Therefore, grandparents taking care of their grandchildren has become a prevalent phenomenon around the world.

There are a few reasons why grandparent involvement is becoming more prevalent. First, life expectancy has increased while fertility rates have decreased. This means that more children are growing up while their grandparents are still alive and able to become involved in childcare. In addition, the reduced fertility rates mean that grandparents can devote more attention and resources to their only grandchildren. Second, more mothers are involved in the workforce, and thus, other caregivers need to be present to care for the child. For instance, in Hong Kong, 55% of grandparents reported that they took care of their grandchild because his or her parents have to work. In South Korea, 53% of working mothers reported that they once received child care services from their parents. Third, the increasing number of single-parent families creates a need for grandparental support.

The degree of grandparent involvement also varies depending on the societal context, such as the social welfare policies. For example, in European countries such as Sweden and Denmark, where formal childcare is widely available, grandparents provide less intensive childcare. By contrast, in European countries such as Spain and Italy, where formal childcare is limited, and welfare payment is low, grandparents provide more intensive childcare. In Singapore, the grandparent caregiver tax relief was established in 2004, which enables working parents (Singapore citizens with children age 12 and below) whose children are being cared for by unemployed grandparents to receive income tax relief of 3,000 Singaporean dollars.

=== Types ===
There are different types of grandparental involvement, including nonresident grandparents, co-resident grandparents, grandparent-maintained household, and custodial grandparents.

- Nonresident grandparents: Grandparents who do not live with their grandchildren, but provide care for them, such as picking them up from school.
- Co-resident grandparents: Grandparents who live with their grandchild, as well as their parents. This type of household is also known as three-generational households. According to a report that uses data from the 2010 Census, the American Community Survey (ACS), the Current Population Survey (CPS), and the Survey of Income and Program Participation (SIPP), co-resident grandparents are more likely to be in poverty and suffer from an illness or disability.
- Grandparent-maintained households: A grandparent who is in charge of the household. In this type of household, the parents may or may not be present. In the US, 33% of children who live in a grandparent-maintained household have only the grandparents present; this is comparable to another 30% who live with a grandmother and one or more parents.
- Custodial grandparents: Grandparents who raise their grandchildren without the presence of the grandchildren's parents in the household. This type of involvement is especially common among ethnic minority groups; approximately 50% of custodial grandparents in the USA belong to an ethnic minority group. In general, grandparents adopt the primary caregiving role for various reasons, such as when the parents have died, been imprisoned, been deployed by the military, or lost custody of their children due to neglect or abuse.

=== Impact ===
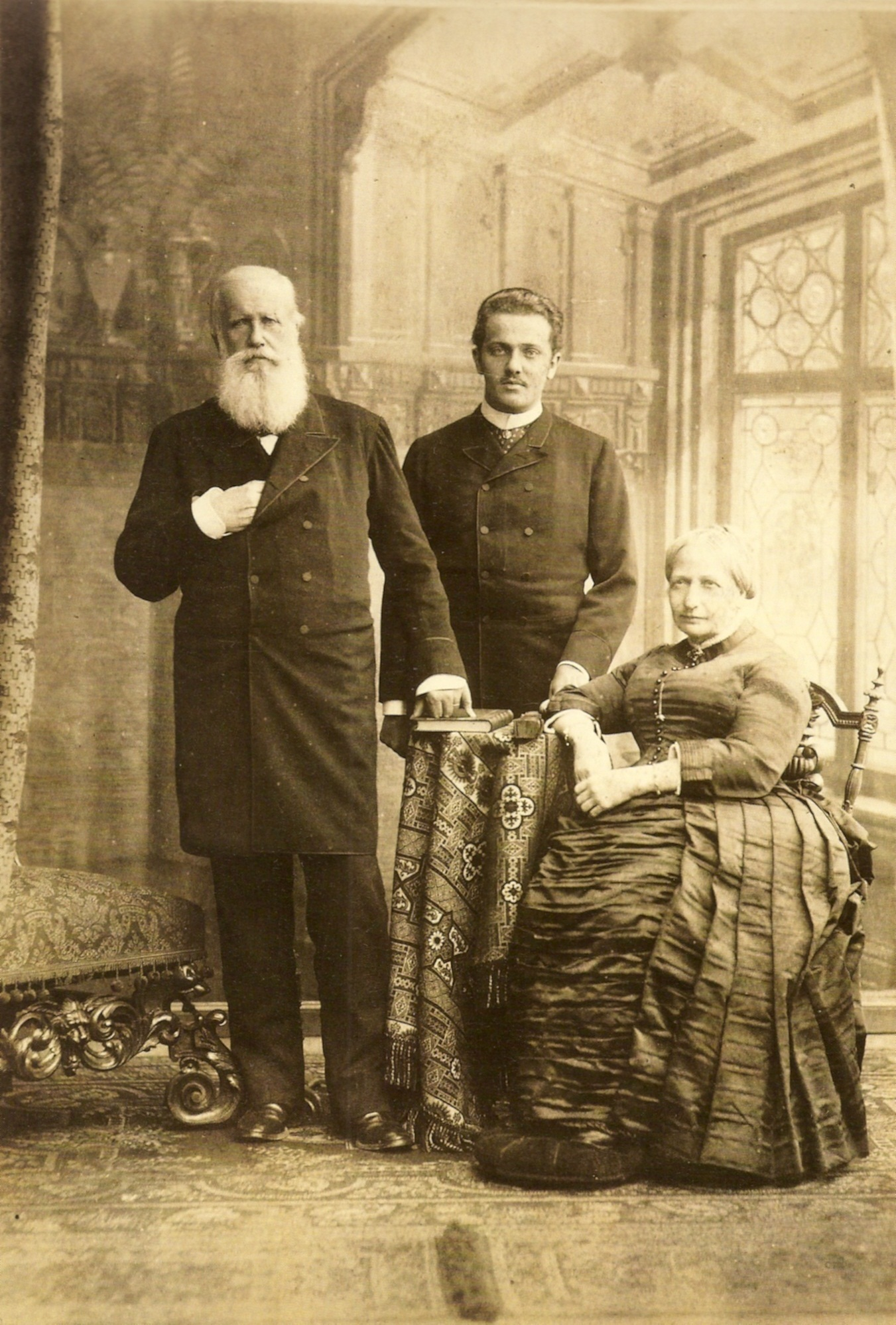
Emperor Pedro II of Brazil (left, pictured here in 1887) and his wife Teresa Cristina (right, seated) took care of their grandsons, Princes Pedro Augusto (center) and Augusto Leopoldo (not pictured), after their daughter died. Although Pedro Augusto enjoyed the status of Pedro II's favorite grandson, due to their affinity for studies (which gave him the nickname "the Preferred"), other chroniclers noted that Augusto Leopoldo's temper, completely opposite to that of his grandfather, made him the monarch's favorite.

==== On grandchildren ====
Grandparents have different functions in child development. Not only do they provide instrumental support such as picking grandchildren up from school or feeding them, but they also offer emotional support. Furthermore, grandparents protect children from being impacted by negative circumstances, such as harsh parenting, poor economic status, and single-parent families. In addition to providing support, grandparents can also help grandchildren with their schoolwork or teach them values that are integral to their society.

Grandparents can have a positive or negative impact on child development. On the one hand, previous research suggests that children and adolescents who have a close relationship with their grandparents tend to have better well-being, experience fewer emotional problems, and demonstrate fewer problematic behaviours. They are also more academically engaged and are more likely to help others. On the other hand, there are also research studies indicating that grandparent involvement is associated with more hyperactivity and peer difficulties among young children. In other words, children who are cared for by their grandparents can have more interpersonal relationship problems. Also, children who are under the care of their grandparents have poorer health outcomes such as obesity, and more injuries due to low safety awareness.

==== On grandparents ====
Since taking care of grandchildren could be a highly demanding job that requires constant energy and time devotion, grandparental involvement in child raising could have a negative impact on grandparents' physical and emotional health. For example, taking care of grandchildren can reduce grandparents' own time for self-care such as missing their medical appointments. Therefore, they are likely to have a higher chance to suffer from physical health issues. In the US, compared with those who do not take care of their grandchildren, grandparents who are involved in childcare are more likely to have poor physical conditions, such as heart disease, hypertension or body pain. Besides physical health issues, grandparents are also likely to have emotional issues. To be more specific, raising young children again could be a stressful and overwhelming experience and thus results in different kinds of negative emotions such as anxiety or depression. In addition to physical and emotional issues, grandparents who are involved in caring for their grandchildren can also suffer socially. For instance, grandparents will be forced to limit their social activities so as to care for their grandchildren. By doing so, grandparents become more isolated from their social relations. Taking care of grandchildren also means more responsibilities, grandparents would fear for their grandchildren's future well-being because of their disability and death in the future. If grandparents cannot handle the caregiver role of their grandchildren well, this job can eventually become a burden or stressor and bring more severe physical health and emotional issues to grandparents.

However, there are also positive effects of being involved in grandchildren raising. Compared with grandparents who do not provide caregiving to their grandchildren, those who take care of their grandchildren with long hours are more likely to have better cognitive functions. To be more specific, taking care of grandchildren helps elder grandparents maintain their mental capacities in later life, they are also less likely to develop diseases such as dementia. Moreover, frequent interactions with their grandchildren could reduce the cognitive aging process, allowing grandparents a chance to live a more vibrant and active life. Grandparents also get benefits of physically exercising more during this process.

Taking care of grandchildren can also have benefits on grandparents' emotional health. As an example, many grandparents start to feel a sense of purpose and meaning in life again after their retirement; as another example, their ties with their adult children and grandchildren are also strengthened. Many grandparents also think of the caregiving experience as positive because it provides another chance for them to make up mistakes they made with their own children and give them more opportunities to educate their grandchildren and improve their parenting styles.

== Cultural comparisons ==
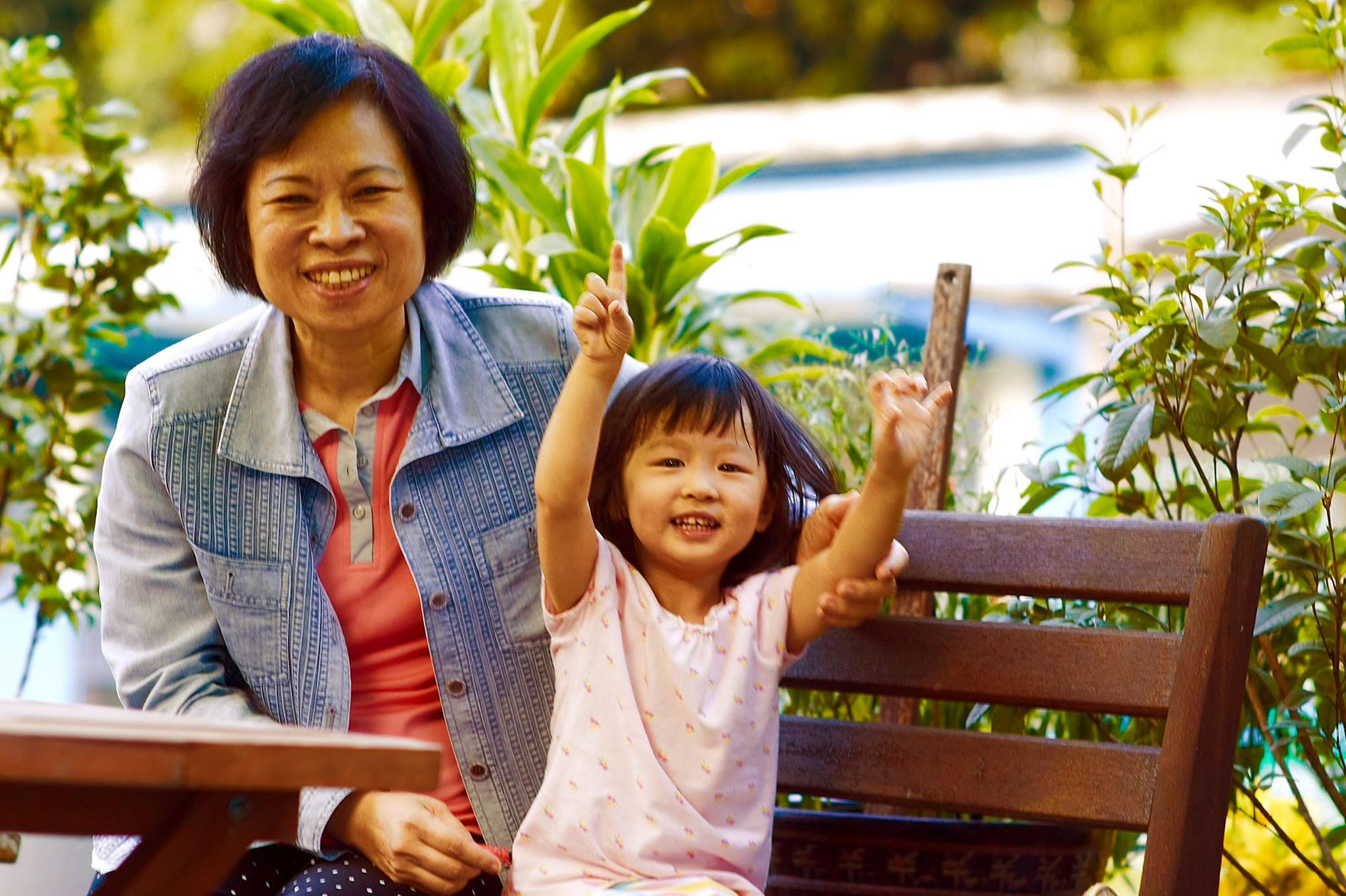
Grandmother and her granddaughter

Grandparental involvement differs between Western and Eastern cultures. Grandparents taking care of their grandchildren is a common phenomenon in China due to Chinese traditions which emphasize family harmony, collective well-being, intergenerational exchanges and filial responsibilities. China's unique philosophies, Buddhism and Taoism, play important roles in forming these cultural values. While Chinese Buddhism emphasizes prioritized role of the family in Chinese society and harmonious relations among family members, Taoism emphasizes the importance of harmony in interpersonal relations and relations between nature and the humans. These philosophies underline the important role that families play in Chinese cultures. Besides cultural factors, grandparents taking care of their grandchildren also appears in the context in which their adult children need to work full-time, and the child care services are either too expensive (in big cities) or too scarce (in remote areas). Grandparents serving as their grandchildren's caregiver is particularly common in rural China. Due to the fast development of urbanization in China since the 1980s, up to 220 million migrant workers from rural areas move to urban areas to seek for more job opportunities, which leave around 58 million children behind in rural areas, grandparents, therefore, undertake the role of parents and become caregivers to their grandchildren. A new population named "left-behind grandparents" appears in this context, these grandparents live in rural China, and their main job is to look after their grandchildren, most of these grandparents are facing financial burdens and wish their adult children could come back. The mental and physical health of "left-behind grandparents" needs more attention from the public. Even though in urban areas where child care services are available, nearly all grandparents still prefer to take care of their grandchildren voluntarily. Not only because this can reduce their adult children's financial burdens on child care services but also taking care of their own grandchildren is a more effective way to maintain family harmony.

=== In United States ===
In the US, taking care of grandchildren is not a necessary responsibility of grandparents. Grandparents taking care of their grandchildren is often caused by involuntary events or crisis, and it is more like a solution to a problem, not an initiative desire, which is a distinct difference from that in China. For example, grandparents in the USA often take care of their grandchildren when their adult children get into troubles such as substance abuse, incarceration or parental death. Differences also exist in different ethnicities in the US. Caucasian individuals generally regard individual independence as more important, so grandparents are less likely to take care of their grandchildren. However, African American and Latino individuals are more likely to regard looking after grandchildren as a family tradition and are more willing to provide help for their adult children. Ethnic differences in grandparents looking after their grandchildren reflect different cultural values that different ethnic groups hold. To be more specific, African American grandparents are more likely to provide guidance and discipline to their grandchildren due to their flexible family system in which relatives and nonblood kin are all willing to help each other. Latino families have a strong preference to live together and keep frequent contact with family members because most of them are immigrants or first-generation born in the US; they are more likely to live and function as a unit. Grandparents in Latino culture also play important roles in stabilizing the family unit as family leaders. Although Caucasian grandparents are less likely to raise their grandchildren, they have more cognitive or physical burdens of taking care of grandchildren compared with other ethnic groups, mainly because their caregiver roles are less normative, and they rely more on remote or companionate parenting styles. On the contrary, African American and Latino grandparents rely more on disciplinary and instructional parenting styles and they are less likely to have cognitive or physical burdens when taking care of their grandchildren.

=== In France ===
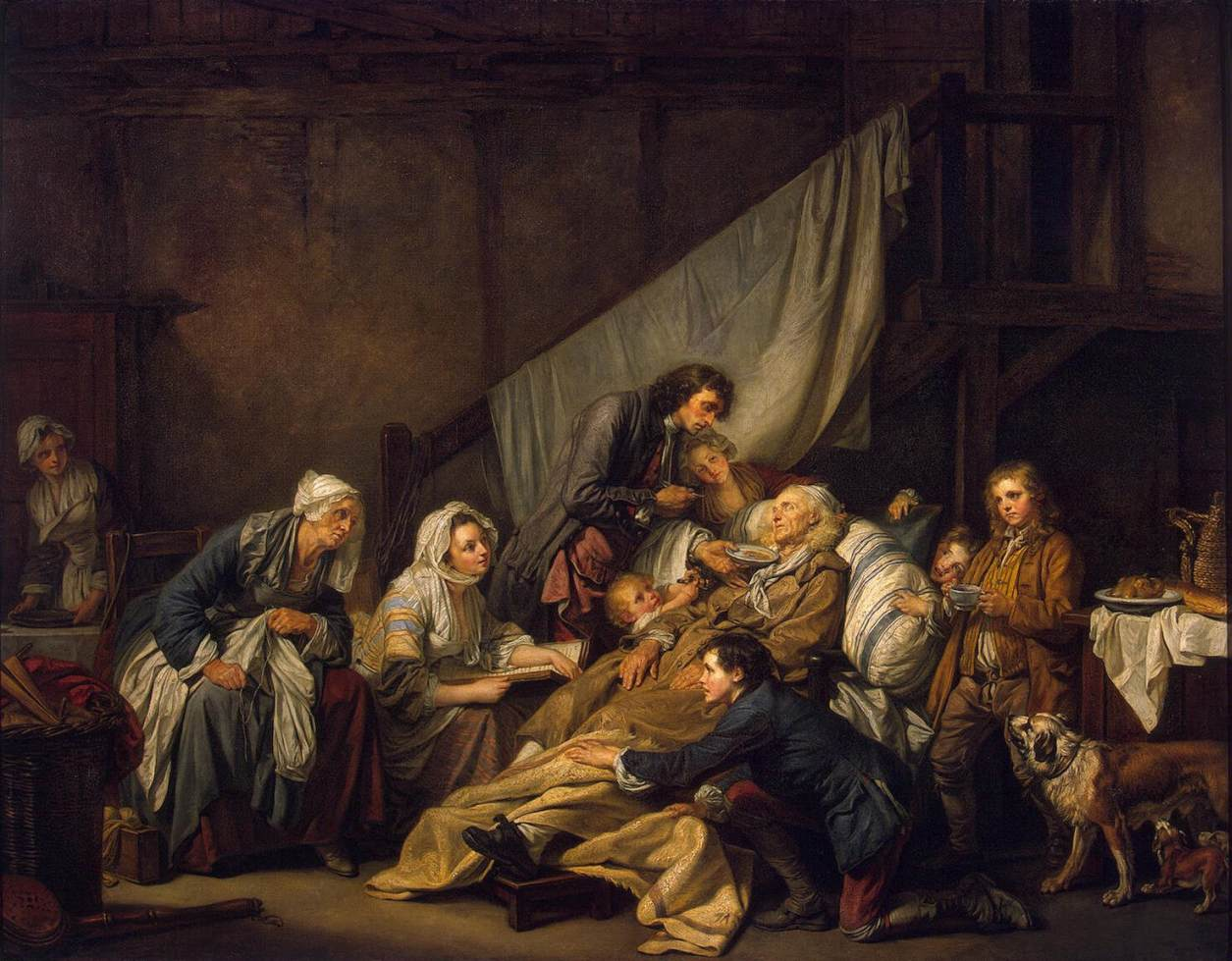
Filial Piety, a 1763 painting by Jean-Baptiste Greuze, painter of modern grandparents and filial piety

The representation of grandparents as grandparents is recent in France: Diderot invented the verbs grandpériser and grandmériser in the 18th century. Victor Hugo published L'Art d'être grand-père in 1877.

According to French parish registers and civil status records, at the end of the 18th century, a little more than half of the grandparents were alive at the birth of their grandchild, a third when the child was 10 years old, and still 10% at 20 years old. In rural France at the end of the 18th century, the majority of family systems were of the nuclear family type (grandparents did not cohabit in the family home, they were only welcomed there at the end of their lives). However, in regions such as Alsace, the west of Brittany, Occitania, or the Savoy region, the systems were more complex, with the stem family in particular: the home housed a succession of family nuclei, the patriarch having authority over this home, which could lead to conflict. These cohabitations were therefore managed from the time of marriage by notarial acts that provided for "clauses of insupport" to share the domestic space and tasks in case of conflict.

In the cities of the 19th century, there was generally no cohabitation (with the exception of noble families and their lineage logic, a model that declined after 1850), but bourgeois families often housed all the family branches in the same building (they met with their grandparents at the family home during cousinades) while in the working class, grandparents lived in the same neighborhood, family solidarity remaining strong: the mother working outside the home, the children were often cared for by the grandparents.

The Civil code recognizes few rights for grandparents with regard to parental authority in France, but case law from the 1850s has influenced family legislation: a Court of Cassation ruling on July 8, 1857, recognized the right of grandparents to visit, but this right was only enshrined following the law of January 4, 1970, as part of a general overhaul of family laws in France.

Thus, the lineage-based vision of grandparents in the 18th century was succeeded by the "indulgent grandparent" vision in the centuries that followed. This is reflected in the institutionalization of visits and vacations with grandparents, the use of tu (informal "you") by grandchildren to address grandparents, which developed gradually in the 19th century, the advent of affectionate names (papi and mami, pépé and mémé, papet and mamé in the south of France) given to the baby boomer generation from the 1970s, or the increase in grandparental care, which marks a greater emotional closeness and the de-hierarchization of relationships.

=== In Switzerland ===
In Switzerland, the relationship between grandchildren and grandparents is protected by Article 274a of the Swiss Civil Code:

In exceptional circumstances, the right to maintain personal relations may also be granted to other persons, in particular, to members of the family, provided that this is in the best interests of the child.

Grandparents wishing to benefit from a right of custody must demonstrate in court that these exceptional circumstances are effective. As a simple third party, grandparents do not have a legal right to visit in Switzerland. A motion was rejected in September 2012.

== See also ==
- Aunt
- Cousin
- Kinship care
- Grandfather clause
- Grandfather rule
- Middle age
- Midlife crisis
- Grandparents' Day
- Uncle

== Bibliography ==
- Lessa, Clado Ribeiro de. O Segundo Ramo da Casa Imperial e a nossa Marinha de Guerra, in Revista do Instituto Historico e Geografico Brasileiro, vol. 211, 1951, p. 118-133 (ISSN 0101-4366)
- Defrance, Olivier. La Médicis des Cobourg, Clémentine d'Orléans, Bruxelles, Racine, 2007 (ISBN 2873864869)
- Bragança, Dom Carlos Tasso de Saxe-Coburgo e. As Visitas de Dom Pedro II a Coburgo, in Revista do Instituto Histórico e Geográfico Brasileiro, vol. 272, 1966, p. 201-208 (ISSN 0101-4366)
