= Zhan, Kurdistan =

Zhan ژان
- Village
- Location within Iran
- Coordinates: 35°10′27″N 46°37′00″E
- Country: Iran
- Province: Kurdistan
- County: Sarvabad
- Bakhsh: Central
- Rural District: Bisaran

Population (2006)
  - Total: 864
- Time zone: UTC+3:30 (IRST)
  - Summer (DST): UTC+4:30 (IRDT)

Zhan (Persian: ژان, also Romanized as Zhān; also known as Zān and Zheyān) is a village in Bisaran Rural District, in the Central District of Sarvabad County, Kurdistan Province, Iran. At the 2006 census, its population was 864, in 219 families. The village is populated by Kurds.
