= NASL =

NASL or Nasl may refer to:

- Nasl, Iran (disambiguation)
- NASL Soccer, a 1980 early sports video game
- National Association for the Support of Long Term Care, a US national trade association
- Nessus Attack Scripting Language
- North American Soccer League (1968–1984)
- North American Soccer League (2011–2017)
- North American Star League, a professional esports league for the real-time strategy game StarCraft II
- Nasl, a name for the star Gamma2 Sagittarii
