= Kamaleh =

Village in Kurdistan province, Iran

Kamaleh Persian: كماله
- Village
- Location within Iran Location within Iran Kurdistan
- Coordinates: 35°16′00″N 46°13′53″E
- Country: Iran
- Province: Kurdistan
- County: Sarvabad
- District: Uraman
- Rural District: Uraman Takht

Population (2016)
  - Total: 756
- Time zone: UTC+3:30 (IRST)

Kamaleh (Persian: كماله) (Note: Also romanized as Kamāleh; Sorani Kurdish: کەماڵە, romanized as Kemałe) is a village in Uraman Takht Rural District of Uraman District, Sarvabad County, Kurdistan province, Iran.

== Demographics ==
=== Ethnicity ===
The village is populated by Kurds.

=== Population ===
At the time of the 2006 National Census, the village's population was 786 in 171 households. The following census in 2011 counted 666 people in 160 households. The 2016 census measured the population of the village as 756 people in 199 households. It was the most populous village in its rural district.
