= Tarkhanabad =

Tarkhanabad (Persian: ترخان آباد) may refer to:

- Tarkhanabad, Baneh
- Tarkhanabad, Sarvabad
