= Gavaz =

Gavaz (Persian: گواز or گوز) may refer to:

- Gavaz, Kurdistan (گواز - Gavāz)
- Gavaz, Zanjan (گوز - Gavaz)
