= Selin, Iran =

Village in Kurdistan province, Iran

Selin Persian: سلين
- Village
- Location within Iran Location within Iran Kurdistan
- Coordinates: 35°13′36″N 46°19′20″E
- Country: Iran
- Province: Kurdistan
- County: Sarvabad
- District: Uraman
- Rural District: Shalyar

Population (2016)
  - Total: 723
- Time zone: UTC+3:30 (IRST)

Selin (Persian: سلين) (Note: Also romanized as Selīn; Sorani Kurdish: سلێن, romanized as Silên) is a village in, and the capital of, Shalyar Rural District of Uraman District, Sarvabad County, Kurdistan province, Iran.

== Demographics ==
=== Ethnicity ===
The village is populated by Kurds.

=== Population ===
At the time of the 2006 National Census, the village's population was 910 in 194 households. The following census in 2011 counted 747 people in 200 households. The 2016 census measured the population of the village as 723 people in 206 households.
