= Sarvabad =

City in Kurdistan province, Iran

Sarvabad Persian: سروآباد
- City
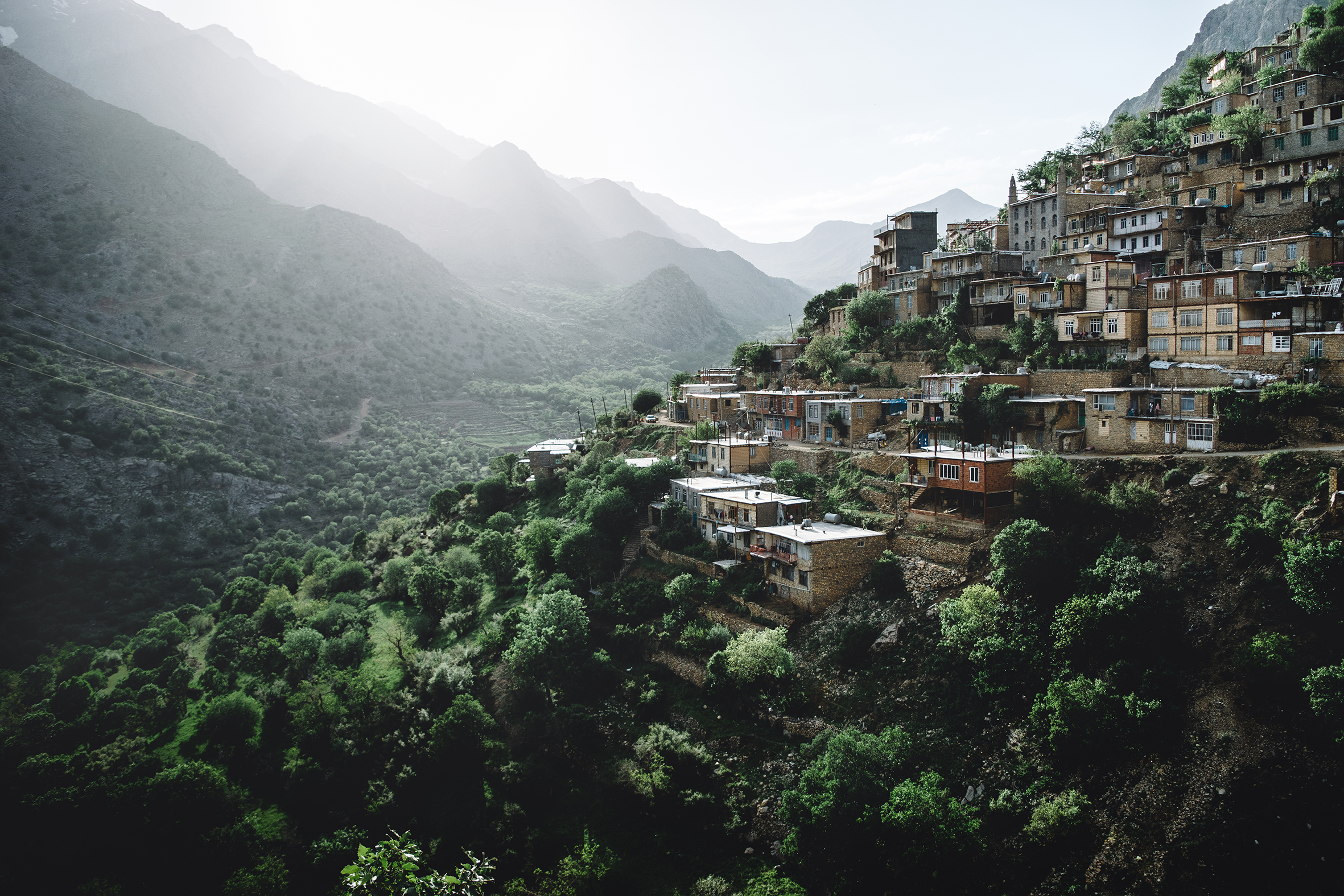

- Location within Iran Location within Iran Kurdistan
- Coordinates: 35°18′40″N 46°22′09″E
- Country: Iran
- Province: Kurdistan
- County: Sarvabad
- District: Central
- Elevation: 1,130 m (3,710 ft)

Population (2016)
  - Total: 5,121
- Time zone: UTC+3:30 (IRST)

Sarvabad (Persian: سروآباد) (Note: Also romanized as Sarvābād; also known as Sarrābād, Saulāwa, and Sūlāveh; Kurdish: romanized as Sewllawa) is a city in the Central District of Sarvabad County, Kurdistan province, Iran, serving as capital of both the county and the district.

== Demographics ==
=== Ethnicity ===
The city is populated by Kurds.

=== Population ===
At the time of the 2006 National Census, the city's population was 3,707 in 955 households. The following census in 2011 counted 4,976 people in 1,318 households. The 2016 census measured the population of the city as 5,121 people in 1,498 households.
