= Nautical Almanac Office =

Nautical Almanac Office may refer to:

- HM Nautical Almanac Office, in the United Kingdom
- The Nautical Almanac Office, at the United States Naval Observatory

== See also ==
- NAO (disambiguation)
