= Degagah =

Degagah, Dagagah or Degaga may refer to the following places in Iran:

- Degagah, Saqqez
- Degagah, Sarvabad
