= Nesel =

Nesel or Nasl (Persian: نسل) may refer to:

- Nasl, Kurdistan
- Nesel, Mazandaran
- Nesel, alternate name of Neshel, Mazandaran Province
