= Zakaria, Iran =

Zakaria ذكريا
- Village
- Location within Iran
- Coordinates: 36°16′34″N 59°31′29″E
- Country: Iran
- Province: Razavi Khorasan
- County: Torqabeh and Shandiz
- Bakhsh: Torqabeh
- Rural District: Torqabeh

Population (2006)
  - Total: 116
- Time zone: UTC+3:30 (IRST)
  - Summer (DST): UTC+4:30 (IRDT)

Zakaria (Persian: ذكريا, also Romanized as Z̄akarīā; also known as Kalāteh-ye Z̄akarīā) is a village in Torqabeh Rural District, Torqabeh District, Torqabeh and Shandiz County, Razavi Khorasan Province, Iran. At the 2006 census, its population was 116, in 29 families.
