= National Applications Office =

The National Applications Office (NAO) was a United States Department of Homeland Security program that provided local, state, and federal officials extensive access to spy-satellite imagery. It had access to military satellites to observe the United States.

== Details ==
The NAO was described as a clearinghouse for requests by law enforcement, border security, and other domestic homeland security agencies to access feeds from spy satellites that had collected data for mainly scientific and military uses in the past. The name of the agency had been described as "deceptive."

Access to spy satellite surveillance tools allowed Homeland Security and law enforcement officials to see real-time, high-quality images. Which allowed them to identify gang safe houses, border smuggler staging areas, or even hideouts of would-be terrorists. The spy surveillance satellites were considered by military experts to be far more powerful than those that were currently available to civilian officials. They could take color photos, see through cloud cover and forest canopies, and used different parts of the light spectrum to locate traces left by chemical weapons. However, the full capabilities of these systems are among the most carefully held governmental secrets.

On October 2, 2007, the United States Congress had filed an injunction against the NAO, that ordered it not to begin operations, due to concerns about civil liberty issues. Some in Congress wanted to shut down the agency due to concerns that the satellites could be used to create a "Big Brother" in the sky directed at anyone's house, place of worship or school.

The NAO's charter was signed in February 2008. On November 9, 2008, the Government Accountability Office released a recommendation that the NAO's role be more strictly defined. This might be seen as evidence that the aforementioned civil liberty issues have not been sufficiently addressed.

In 2009 Secretary of Homeland Security Janet Napolitano terminated the office.
