= Uraman Takht =

City in Kurdistan province, Iran

Uraman Takht Persian: اورامان تخت Hawrami Kurdish: ھەورامان تەخت
- City
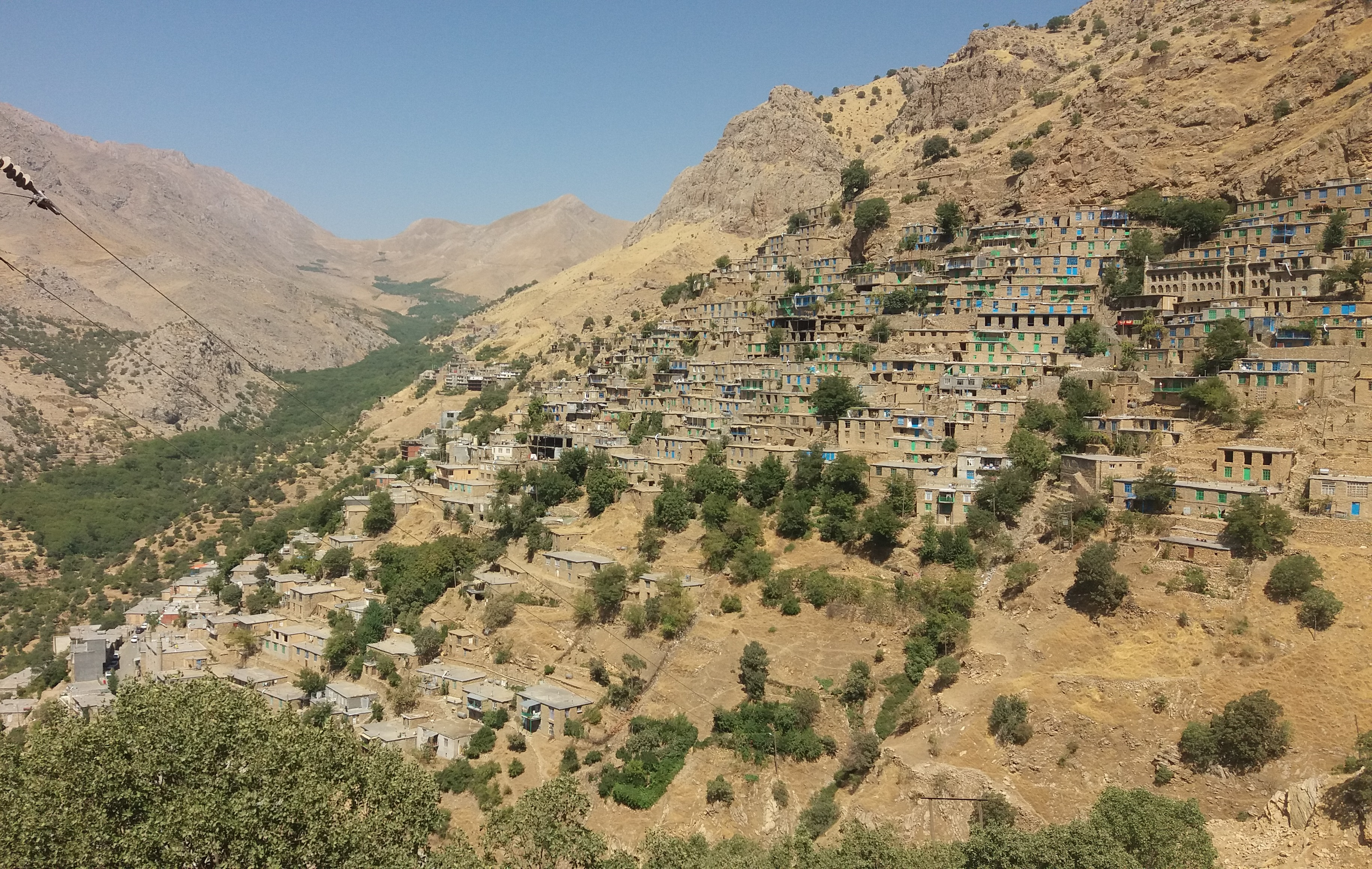
- The city of Uraman Takht

- Location within Iran Location within Iran Kurdistan
- Coordinates: 35°15′05″N 46°15′40″E
- Country: Iran
- Province: Kurdistan
- County: Sarvabad
- District: Uraman

Population (2016)
  - Total: 3,176
- Time zone: UTC+3:30 (IRST)

Uraman Takht (Persian: اورامان تخت) (Note: Also romanized as Ooraman Takht and Ūrāmān Takht; also known as Avromān, Owrāmān, Owrāmān Shahr, Shehr-i-Avrōman, and Ūrāmān; Hawrami Kurdish: ھەورامان تەخت, romanized as Hewraman Text) is a city in, and the capital of, Uraman District of Sarvabad County, Kurdistan province, Iran. It also serves as the administrative center for Uraman Takht Rural District.

== History ==
During the Iran-Iraq war, Uraman Takht, as the center of Uraman region, came under the control of the Sipay Rizgari group led by Sheykh Osman Naqshbandi. In September-October 1981, it was at the center of a battle for control over the region, before being recaptured by Iranian forces. Approximately 50 Sipay Rizgari fighters were killed and 200 captured by Iranian forces during the battle for the city.

== Demographics ==
=== Ethnicity ===
The city is populated by Kurds who speak Gorani.

=== Population ===
At the time of the 2006 National Census, Uraman Takht's population was 2,754 in 644 households, when it was a village in Uraman Takht Rural District. The following census in 2011 counted 2,761 people in 711 households. The 2016 census measured the population as 3,176 people in 911 households, by which time Uraman Takht had been elevated to the status of a city.
