= Nasehabad, Hamadan =

Nasehabad ناصح اباد
- Village
- Location within Iran
- Coordinates: 34°16′33″N 48°40′46″E
- Country: Iran
- Province: Hamadan
- County: Malayer
- Bakhsh: Samen
- Rural District: Haram Rud-e Sofla

Population (2006)
  - Total: 51
- Time zone: UTC+3:30 (IRST)
  - Summer (DST): UTC+4:30 (IRDT)

Nasehabad (Persian: ناصح اباد, also Romanized as Nāşeḩābād; also known as Garābād, Garrabad, and Naşrābād) is a village in Haram Rud-e Sofla Rural District, Samen District, Malayer County, Hamadan Province, Iran. At the 2006 census, its population was 51, in 13 families.
