= Dezli, Gilan =

Dezli دزلي
- Village
- Location within Iran
- Coordinates: 36°58′30″N 50°16′23″E
- Country: Iran
- Province: Gilan
- County: Rudsar
- Bakhsh: Rahimabad
- Rural District: Rahimabad

Population (2006)
  - Total: 120
- Time zone: UTC+3:30 (IRST)
  - Summer (DST): UTC+4:30 (IRDT)

Dezli (Persian: دزلي, also Romanized as Dezlī) is a village in Rahimabad Rural District, Rahimabad District, Rudsar County, Gilan Province, Iran. At the 2006 census, its population was 120, in 31 families.
