= Dorudgaran =

Dorudgaran درودگران
- Village
- Location within Iran
- Coordinates: 34°01′13″N 48°55′29″E
- Country: Iran
- Province: Lorestan
- County: Borujerd
- Bakhsh: Central
- Rural District: Darreh Seydi

Population (2006)
  - Total: 123
- Time zone: UTC+3:30 (IRST)
  - Summer (DST): UTC+4:30 (IRDT)

Dorudgaran (Persian: درودگران, also Romanized as Dorūdgarān; also known as Dorūd) is a village in Darreh Seydi Rural District, in the Central District of Borujerd County, Lorestan Province, Iran. At the 2006 census, its population was 123, in 27 families.
