= Zalakeh-ye Hajj Abbas Qoli =

Zalakeh-ye Hajj Abbas Qoli ذالكه حاج عباسقلي
- Village
- Location within Iran
- Coordinates: 34°15′15″N 46°48′54″E
- Country: Iran
- Province: Kermanshah
- County: Kermanshah
- Bakhsh: Mahidasht
- Rural District: Mahidasht

Population (2006)
  - Total: 97
- Time zone: UTC+3:30 (IRST)
  - Summer (DST): UTC+4:30 (IRDT)

Zalakeh-ye Hajj Abbas Qoli (Persian: ذالكه حاج عباسقلي, also Romanized as Zālakeh-ye Ḩājj ‘Abbās Qolī and Z̄ālkeh-ye Ḩājj ‘Abbās Qolī; also known as ‘Abbās Qolī, Dālakeh-ye Ḩājj ‘Abbās Qolī, Deh ‘Azīz, Z̄ālakeh-ye Ḩājī, and Z̄ālkeh-ye Ḩājjī) is a village in Mahidasht Rural District, Mahidasht District, Kermanshah County, Kermanshah Province, Iran. At the 2006 census, its population was 97, in 22 families.
