= Zalakeh-ye Vaziri =

Zalakeh-ye Vaziri ذالكه وزيري
- Village
- Location within Iran
- Coordinates: 34°15′15″N 46°49′04″E
- Country: Iran
- Province: Kermanshah
- County: Kermanshah
- Bakhsh: Mahidasht
- Rural District: Mahidasht

Population (2006)
  - Total: 94
- Time zone: UTC+3:30 (IRST)
  - Summer (DST): UTC+4:30 (IRDT)

Zalakeh-ye Vaziri (Persian: ذالكه وزيري, also Romanized as Zālakeh-ye Vazīrī; also known as Dālakeh-ye Vazīrī, Ẕālkeh-ye Kalb‘alī, and Z̄ālkey-ye Vazīrī) is a village in Mahidasht Rural District, Mahidasht District, Kermanshah County, Kermanshah Province, Iran. At the 2006 census, its population was 94, in 24 families.
