= Paygelan Rural District =

Rural district in Kurdistan province, Iran

Paygelan Rural District Persian: دهستان پايگلان
- Rural District
- Location within Iran Location within Iran Kurdistan
- Coordinates: 35°08′48″N 46°33′34″E
- Country: Iran
- Province: Kurdistan
- County: Sarvabad
- District: Central
- Capital: Paygelan

Population (2016)
  - Total: 4,769
- Time zone: UTC+3:30 (IRST)

Paygelan Rural District (Persian: دهستان پايگلان) is in the Central District of Sarvabad County, Kurdistan province, Iran. Its capital is the village of Paygelan.

== Demographics ==
=== Population ===
At the time of the 2006 National Census, the rural district's population was 6,975 in 1,680 households. There were 5,989 inhabitants in 1,809 households at the following census of 2011. The 2016 census measured the population of the rural district as 4,769 in 1,574 households. The most populous of its six villages was Paygelan, with 1,440 people.
