= Uraman Takht Rural District =

District in Kurdistan province, Iran

Uraman Takht Rural District Persian: دهستان اورامان تخت
- Rural District
- Location within Iran Location within Iran Kurdistan
- Coordinates: 35°16′05″N 46°15′01″E
- Country: Iran
- Province: Kurdistan
- County: Sarvabad
- District: Uraman
- Capital: Uraman Takht

Population (2016)
  - Total: 1,334
- Time zone: UTC+3:30 (IRST)

Uraman Takht Rural District (Persian: دهستان اورامان تخت) is in Uraman District of Sarvabad County, Kurdistan province, Iran. It is administered from the city of Uraman Takht.

== Demographics ==
=== Population ===
At the time of the 2006 National Census, the rural district's population was 4,926 in 1,140 households. There were 4,814 inhabitants in 1,228 households at the following census of 2011. The 2016 census measured the population of the rural district as 1,334 in 374 households. The most populous of its four villages was Kamaleh, with 756 people.
