= Bisaran Rural District =

Rural district in Kurdistan province, Iran

Bisaran Rural District Persian: دهستان بيساران
- Rural District
- Location within Iran Location within Iran Kurdistan
- Coordinates: 35°10′43″N 46°35′36″E
- Country: Iran
- Province: Kurdistan
- County: Sarvabad
- District: Central
- Capital: Bisaran

Population (2016)
  - Total: 3,832
- Time zone: UTC+3:30 (IRST)

Bisaran Rural District (Persian: دهستان بيساران) is in the Central District of Sarvabad County, Kurdistan province, Iran. Its capital is the village of Bisaran.

== Demographics ==
=== Population ===
At the time of the 2006 National Census, the rural district's population was 5,251 in 1,276 households. There were 4,328 inhabitants in 1,246 households at the following census of 2011. The 2016 census measured the population of the rural district as 3,832 in 1,183 households. The most populous of its five villages was Bisaran, with 2,727 people.
