= Kusalan Rural District =

Rural district in Kurdistan province, Iran

Kusalan Rural District Persian: دهستان كوسالان
- Rural District
- Location within Iran Location within Iran Kurdistan
- Coordinates: 35°21′49″N 46°16′44″E
- Country: Iran
- Province: Kurdistan
- County: Sarvabad
- District: Central
- Capital: Qaleh Ji

Population (2016)
  - Total: 8,244
- Time zone: UTC+3:30 (IRST)

Kusalan Rural District (Persian: دهستان كوسالان) (Note: Formerly Sarvabad Rural District (دهستان سروآباد)) is in the Central District of Sarvabad County, Kurdistan province, Iran. Its capital is the village of Qaleh Ji.

== Demographics ==
=== Population ===
At the time of the 2006 National Census, the rural district's population was 10,022 in 2,240 households. There were 9,183 inhabitants in 2,379 households at the following census of 2011. The 2016 census measured the population of the rural district as 8,244 in 2,416 households. The most populous of its 14 villages was Daraki, with 1,540 people.
