= Shalyar Rural District =

Rural district in Kurdistan province, Iran

Shalyar Rural District Persian: دهستان شاليار
- Rural District
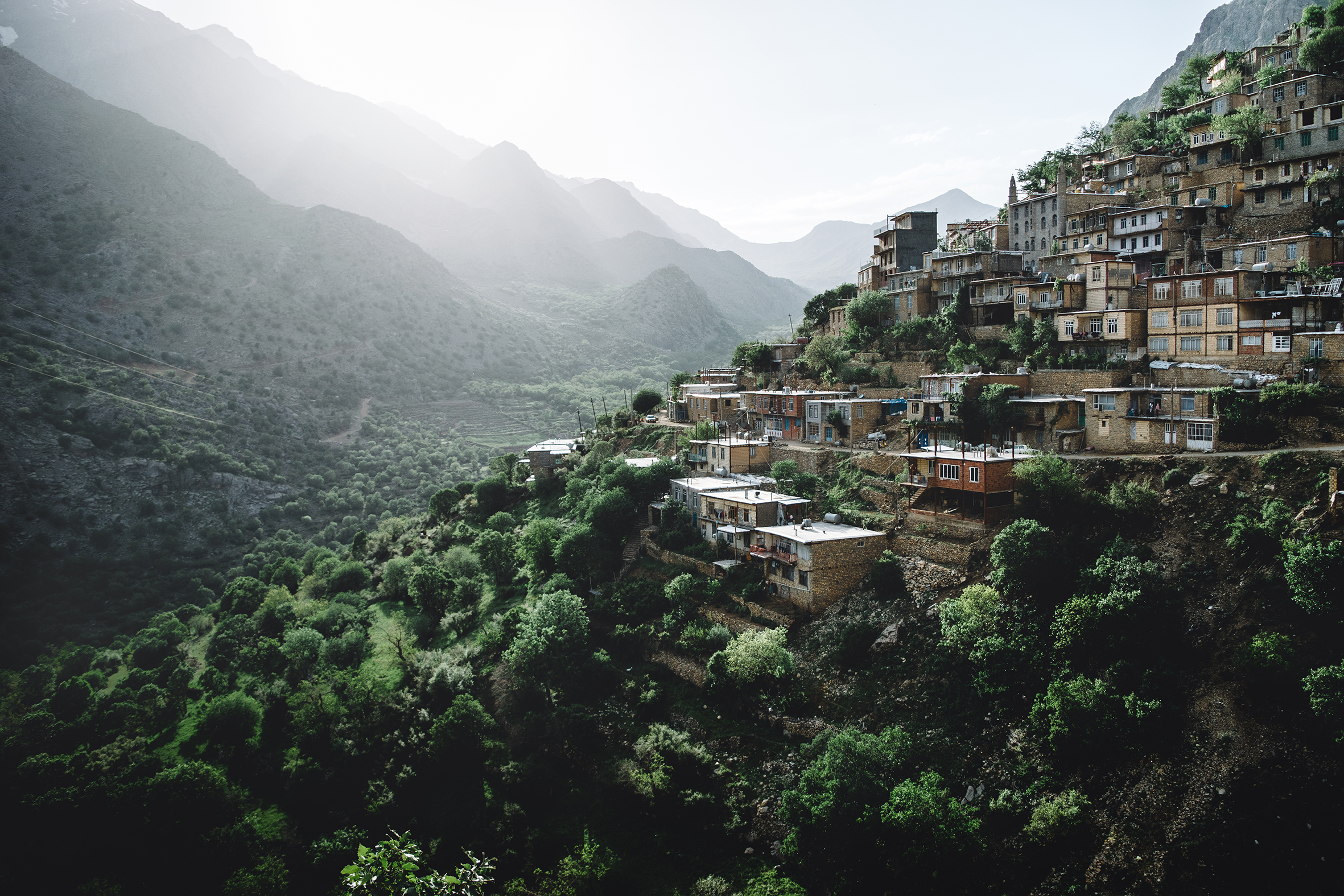
- Shalyar village, 1.2 km south of Uraman Takht

- Location within Iran Location within Iran Kurdistan
- Coordinates: 35°12′14″N 46°20′26″E
- Country: Iran
- Province: Kurdistan
- County: Sarvabad
- District: Uraman
- Capital: Selin

Population (2016)
  - Total: 4,056
- Time zone: UTC+3:30 (IRST)

Shalyar Rural District (Persian: دهستان شاليار) is in Uraman District of Sarvabad County, Kurdistan province, Iran. Its capital is the village of Selin.

== Demographics ==
=== Population ===
At the time of the 2006 National Census, the rural district's population was 5,574 in 1,220 households. There were 4,729 inhabitants in 1,240 households at the following census of 2011. The 2016 census measured the population of the rural district as 4,056 in 1,160 households. The most populous of its 10 villages was Zhivar, with 1,282 people.
