= Dezli Rural District =

Rural district in Kurdistan province, Iran

Dezli Rural District Persian: دهستان دزلی
- Rural District
- Location within Iran Location within Iran Kurdistan
- Coordinates: 35°20′29″N 46°10′52″E
- Country: Iran
- Province: Kurdistan
- County: Sarvabad
- District: Central
- Capital: Dezli

Population (2016)
  - Total: 5,377
- Time zone: UTC+3:30 (IRST)

Dezli Rural District (Persian: دهستان دزلی) is in the Central District of Sarvabad County, Kurdistan province, Iran. Its capital is the village of Dezli.

== Demographics ==
=== Population ===
At the time of the 2006 National Census, the rural district's population was 4,914 in 1,108 households. There were 5,185 inhabitants in 1,311 households at the following census of 2011. The 2016 census measured the population of the rural district as 5,377 in 1,595 households. The most populous of its nine villages was Dezli, with 2,733 people.
