= Razab Rural District =

Rural district in Kurdistan province, Iran

Razab Rural District Persian: دهستان رزآب
- Rural District
- Location within Iran Location within Iran Kurdistan
- Coordinates: 35°16′57″N 46°23′07″E
- Country: Iran
- Province: Kurdistan
- County: Sarvabad
- District: Central
- Capital: Razab

Population (2016)
  - Total: 6,065
- Time zone: UTC+3:30 (IRST)

Razab Rural District (Persian: دهستان رزآب) is in the Central District of Sarvabad County, Kurdistan province, Iran. Its capital is the village of Razab.

== Demographics ==
=== Population ===
At the time of the 2006 National Census, the rural district's population was 7,243 in 1,747 households. There were 6,715 inhabitants in 1,924 households at the following census of 2011. The 2016 census measured the population of the rural district as 6,065 in 1,830 households. The most populous of its 13 villages was Gushkhani, with 968 people.
