= Zherizhah Rural District =

Rural district in Kurdistan province, Iran

Zherizhah Rural District Persian: دهستان ژريژه
- Rural District
- Location within Iran Location within Iran Kurdistan
- Coordinates: 35°06′53″N 46°31′00″E
- Country: Iran
- Province: Kurdistan
- County: Sarvabad
- District: Central
- Capital: Zherizhah

Population (2016)
  - Total: 2,966
- Time zone: UTC+3:30 (IRST)

Zherizhah Rural District (Persian: دهستان ژريژه) is in the Central District of Sarvabad County, Kurdistan province, Iran. Its capital is the village of Zherizhah.

== Demographics ==
=== Population ===
At the time of the 2006 National Census, the rural district's population was 5,380 in 1,275 households. There were 3,922 inhabitants in 1,126 households at the following census of 2011. The 2016 census measured the population of the rural district as 2,966 in 934 households. The most populous of its 19 villages was Dal, with 705 people.
