= Uraman District =

District in Kurdistan province, Iran

Uraman District Persian: بخش اورامان
- District
- Location within Iran Location within Iran Kurdistan
- Coordinates: 35°13′33″N 46°18′50″E
- Country: Iran
- Province: Kurdistan
- County: Sarvabad
- Capital: Uraman Takht

Population (2016)
  - Total: 8,566
- Time zone: UTC+3:30 (IRST)

Uraman District (Persian: بخش اورامان) is in Sarvabad County, Kurdistan province, Iran. Its capital is the city of Uraman Takht.

== History ==
After the 2011 National Census, the village of Uraman Takht was elevated to the status of a city.

== Demographics ==
=== Population ===
At the time of the 2006 census, the district's population was 10,500 in 2,360 households. The following census in 2011 counted 9,543 people in 2,468 households. The 2016 census measured the population of the district as 8,566 inhabitants in 2,445 households.

=== Administrative divisions ===
Uraman District Population
Administrative Divisions	2006	2011	2016
Shalyar RD	5,574	4,729	4,056
Uraman Takht RD	4,926	4,814	1,334
Uraman Takht (city)			3,176
Total	10,500	9,543	8,566
RD = Rural District
