= Central District (Sarvabad County) =

District in Kurdistan province, Iran

Central District (Sarvabad County) Persian: بخش مرکزی شهرستان سروآباد
- District
- Location within Iran Location within Iran Kurdistan
- Coordinates: 35°13′N 46°26′E
- Country: Iran
- Province: Kurdistan
- County: Sarvabad
- Capital: Sarvabad

Population (2016)
  - Total: 36,374
- Time zone: UTC+3:30 (IRST)

The Central District of Sarvabad County (Persian: بخش مرکزی شهرستان سروآباد) is in Kurdistan province, Iran. Its capital is the city of Sarvabad.

== Demographics ==
=== Population ===
At the time of the 2006 National Census, the district's population was 43,492 in 10,281 households. The 2011 census counted 40,298 people in 11,113 households. The 2016 census measured the district's population as 36,374 inhabitants in 11,030 households.

=== Administrative divisions ===
Central District (Sarvabad County) Population
Administrative Divisions	2006	2011	2016
Bisaran RD	5,251	4,328	3,832
Dezli RD	4,914	5,185	5,377
Kusalan RD (Note: Formerly Sarvabad Rural District)	10,022	9,183	8,244
Paygelan RD	6,975	5,989	4,769
Razab RD	7,243	6,715	6,065
Zherizhah RD	5,380	3,922	2,966
Sarvabad (city)	3,707	4,976	5,121
Total	43,492	40,298	36,374
RD = Rural District
