= Sarvabad County =

County in Kurdistan province, Iran

Sarvabad County شهرستان سروآباد
- County
- Location of Sarvabad County in Kurdistan province

- Location of Kurdistan province in Iran
- Coordinates: 35°13′N 46°23′E
- Country: Iran
- Province: Kurdistan
- Capital: Sarvabad
- Districts: Central, Uraman

Population (2016)
  - Total: 44,940
- Time zone: UTC+3:30 (IRST)

Sarvabad County (Persian: شهرستان سروآباد) is in Kurdistan province, Iran. Its capital is the city of Sarvabad.

== History ==
After the 2011 National Census, the village of Uraman Takht was elevated to the status of a city.

== Demographics ==
=== Population ===
At the time of the 2006 census, the county's population was 53,992 in 12,641 households. The following census in 2011 counted 49,841 people in 13,550 households. The 2016 census measured the population of the county as 44,940 in 13,475 households.

=== Administrative divisions ===
Sarvabad County's population history and administrative structure over three consecutive censuses are shown in the following table.

Sarvabad County Population
Administrative Divisions	2006	2011	2016
Central District	43,492	40,298	36,374
Bisaran RD	5,251	4,328	3,832
Dezli RD	4,914	5,185	5,377
Kusalan RD (Note: Formerly Sarvabad Rural District)	10,022	9,183	8,244
Paygelan RD	6,975	5,989	4,769
Razab RD	7,243	6,715	6,065
Zherizhah RD	5,380	3,922	2,966
Sarvabad (city)	3,707	4,976	5,121
Uraman District	10,500	9,543	8,566
Shalyar RD	5,574	4,729	4,056
Uraman Takht RD	4,926	4,814	1,334
Uraman Takht (city)			3,176
Total	53,992	49,841	44,940
RD = Rural District

== See also ==
Media related to Sarvabad County at Wikimedia Commons
