= Avroman =

Mountainous region in Iran/Iraq

Avroman Hawraman Kurdish: هه‌ورامان, romanized: Hewraman Persian: اورامان
- Region
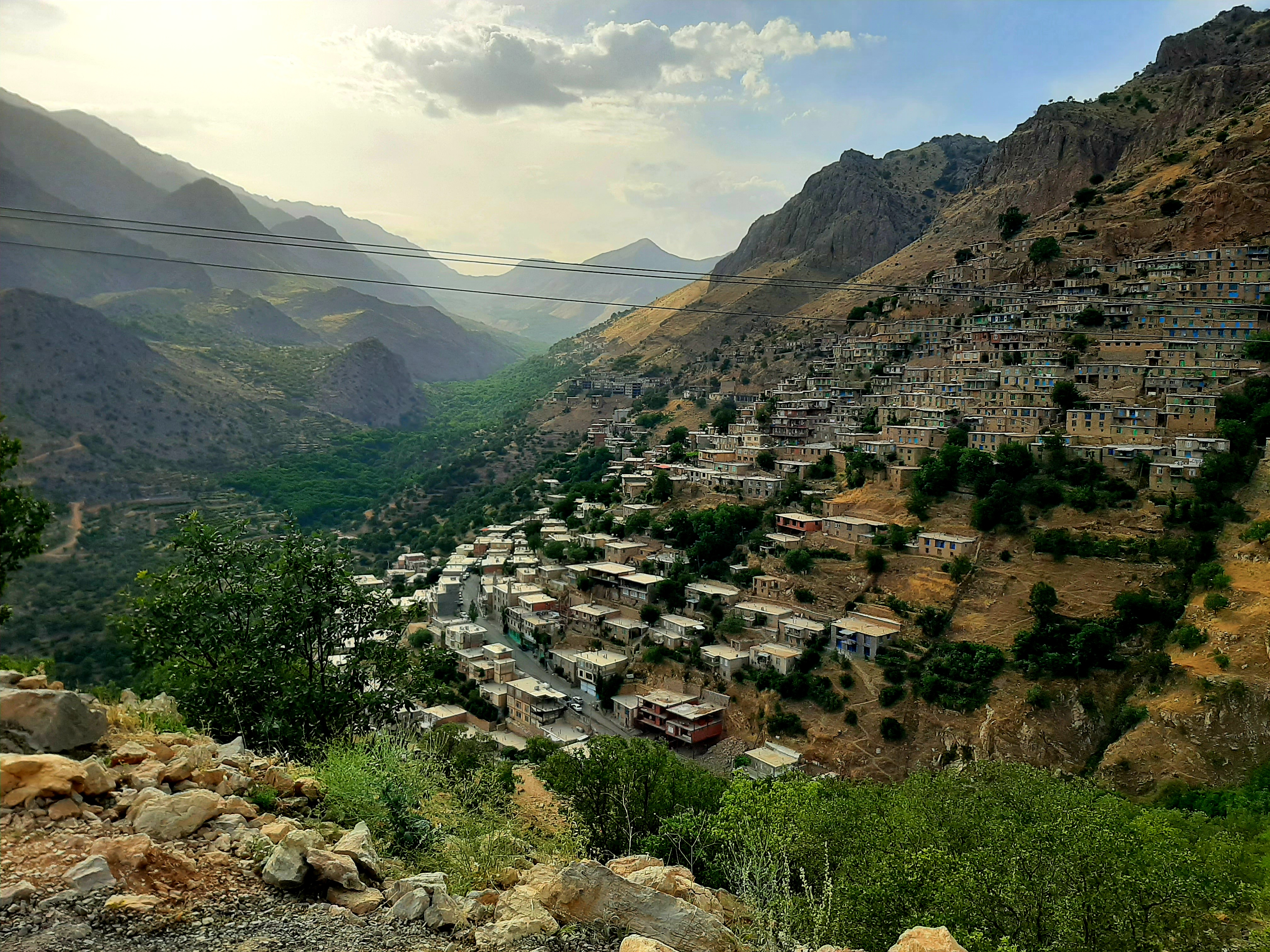
- A typical Kurdish village in Hawraman, Kurdistan Province, Iran
- Country: Iran; Iraq

UNESCO World Heritage Site
- Official name: Cultural Landscape of Hawraman/Uramanat
- Location: A part of the Hawraman region in Iran
- Criteria: Cultural: (iii)(v)
- Reference: 1647
- Inscription: 2021 (44th Session)

Avroman or Hawraman, (Kurdish: هەورامان, romanized: Hewraman, Persian: اورامان, romanized: Owrāmān) is a mountainous region located within the provinces of Kurdistan and Kermanshah in western Iran and in north-eastern Kurdistan Region in Iraq. The main part of the Hawraman region is located in Iran and encompasses two components of the Central-Eastern Valley (Zhawaro and Takht, in Kurdistan Province); and the Western Valley (Lahon, in Kermanshah Province).

The mode of human habitation in these two valleys has been adapted over millennia to the rough mountainous environment. Tiered steep-slope planning and architecture, gardening on dry-stone terraces, livestock breeding, and seasonal vertical migration are among the distinctive features of the local culture and life of the Hawrami Kurdish people who dwell in lowlands and highlands during different seasons of each year.

On July 27, 2021, part of the Hawraman region along with Uramanat were inscribed on the UNESCO World Heritage List as a cultural site under the name "Cultural Landscape of Hawraman/Uramanat".

The word hawraman is formed of two parts ‘Hawra’ means ‘Ahura’ and ‘Man’ means ‘house, position’. Hawraman is the region of Ahura Mazda. ‘Howr’ in Avesta means sun, in this case Hawraman would be translated as ‘Territory of Sun’.

“Avroman Takht” village is located in the center of Uraman District in the southwest of Kurdistan province and "Pir Shalyar" ceremony is held there every year. According to the people belief, Hawraman has been a large city and had a prominent centrality, because of that it has been called the throne or the center of government, and the ancient Iranian religions are in the historical memory of the ancestors of the people of this region and are preserved; and still the historical memories of people arising from the ancestors bear the historical rituals and it is strongly revered. Language, culture, and conventions of people express this ancient history. In this region, Zoroastrianism used to be taught before the Muslim conquest of Persia. The language was derived from Sassanid Pahlavi .

Avroman has many springs and rivers that most their water mainly flows into Sirwan River. Bil spring (or Kani Bil) is one of these springs which has a discharge about 3000-4000 liters per second. The river which is made of Bil spring is the shortest river in the world with a total length of 15 meters. Construction of Darian Dam on the Sirwan River between 2009 and 2015 initiated the Darian Dam Archaeological Salvage Program that led to discovery of many archaeological sites before flooding of the reservoir.

== Archaeology and history ==
=== Prehistoric periods ===
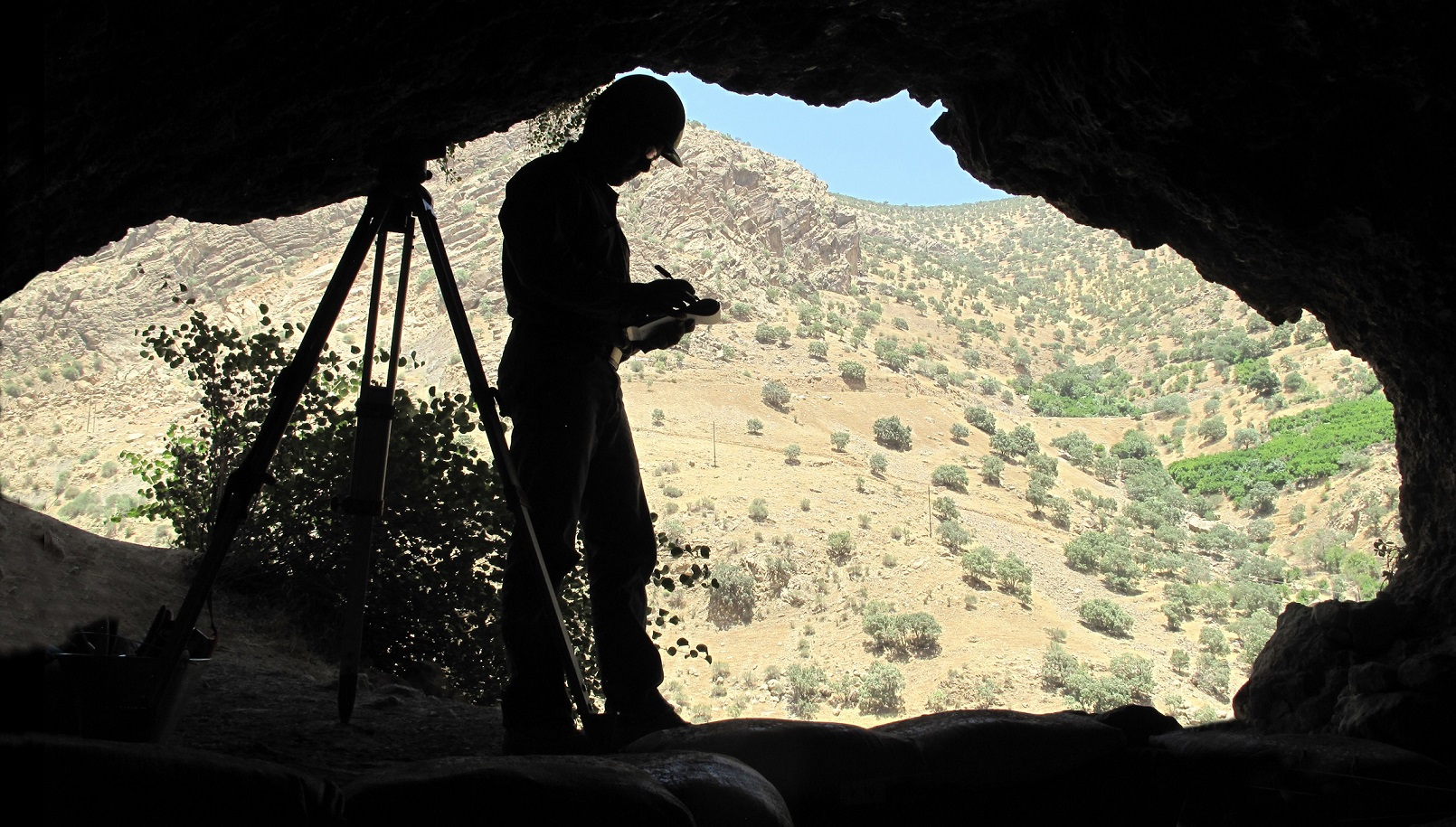
The Paleolithic cave site of Kenacheh is one of the oldest human occupation sites in Hawraman that was used between 35,000 and 12,000 years ago

The earliest archaeological evidence shows that the region was inhabited by humans since Middle Paleolithic period (more than 40,000 years ago).

This evidence was discovered by archaeologists near Hajij village and between Naw and Asparez villages in the Sirwan valley. These earliest finds include stone tools that made by Neanderthals or Early Modern Humans. Evidence for Late Paleolithic occupation discovered in a cave site called Kenacheh in the Perdi Mala valley.

These archaeological finds were unearthed during the Darian Dam Archaeological Salvage Program that conducted several seasons of archaeological surveys and excavations within the area of the reservoir that leading to the discovery of a number of important Paleolithic and later sites. The Main excavated sites were Dārāi Rockshelter (Middle Paleolithic), Kenācheh Cave (Upper Paleolithic), Ruwār tomb (Iron Age), Sar Cham (Chalcolithic and Iron Age), and Barda Mār (19th century). Except for Ruwar sites, all other excavated sites were flooded in 2015–2016.

Several Paleolithic sites have been recorded in the south of Hawraman, where Paleolithic hunters used two rock shelters for seasonal or short-term habitation near the villages of Shamshir and Zardui during a period that archaeologists call Middle Paleolithic.(Arkeonews)

=== Historic periods ===
The Inscription of Sargon II at Tang-i Var pass near the village of Tang-i Var, indicates that the region was occupied by Assyrians during their military campaigns into Zagros. This Royal Inscription belongs to Sargon II, King of Assyria (721–705 BC).

The Parchments of Avroman, a set of three documents from the Seleucid and Parthian eras, were found in the region in 1909. They were discovered in a cave on Kuh-e Salan Mountain, near the village of Shar Hawraman, and subsequently sent to London. The documents date from 88/87 BC to 33 AD, with two written in Greek and one in Parthian. They document the sale of a vineyard and another land, and include the names of Pātaspak, son of Tīrēn and Awīl, son of Baænīn.

Ancient religions are also practiced throughout Avroman and the region is home to the ancient holy places of the Yarsan faith. Some scholars believe that the name Hawraman or Huraman has strong connections to the ancient Zoroastrian faith and claim that the name may have originated from Ahuraman or Ahura Mazda. Ahura Mazda is the name of God in the ancient Indo-Iranian Avestan language and comes from the ancient Zoroastrian faith, which is still being practiced by very small numbers of people in the region. Many areas in the Avroman region are believed to have been pilgrimage sites for Zoroastrians prior to the advent of Islam. One of the oldest Islamic period evidence is Negel quran. A leather-bound Quran written in the Kufic script with gilded page borders, dates to 4th century AH (913 CE – 1009 CE) which is kept in a mosque in the Negel village.

=== Iran-Iraq war ===
At the start of the Iran-Iraq war, most of Avroman came under the control of Sipay Rizgari, an anti-government militant group backed by Iraq. In September–October 1981, the city of Avroman Takht and surrounding settlements were retaken by Iranian forces.

== Culture ==
The inhabitants of Avroman are Hewrami, who speak the Hawrami dialect of the Gorani language. Traditional clothing for women includes either a vest or long-sleeved jacket or long overcoat worn over a gown. An under dress and puffy pants is worn beneath the gown. Traditionally women wore Hewrami hats ornamented with valued coloured stones, beads and gold pieces. Usually younger women and young girls wear brightly coloured dresses adorned with many beads and sequins and the older women wear darker colours and white head-cover. Hawrami men generally wear a shirt; a vest with an open neck; and baggy trousers fitted at the ankles. A cotton sash 3–4 m long is folded in half lengthwise and wrapped tightly around the torso on waist. Men also wore traditional brown felt jackets with pointed shoulders called Kolabal.

Siyaw Chemane is a style of singing practiced by the Hewrams in Avroman people and means hymn song in Hewrami. It is performed without the use of any instruments, with the exception of the occasional use of a Kurdish hand-drum or Daf. Today, the Siya Cheman style is used mostly for storytelling and entertainment.

== Wildlife ==
Hawraman is home to divers fauna, including the Persian leopard (Panthera pardus tulliana), brown bear (Ursus arctos), mouflon (Ovis orientalis orientalis), wolf (Canis lupus), and Wild goat (Capra aegrarus) that can be found throughout the region. Buzin and Markhil Protected Area (Kurdish: بوزین و مارخێڵ) is located at the southwest of Hawraman in Paveh and Javanrud counties of Kermanshah province. Hunting and shooting is prohibited and in 1999, it was registered as a protected area.

Flora

The Hawraman Mountains are one of the most floristically diverse regions of Kurdistan, hosting a valuable number of species that are endemic, rare or endangered in the region. A study published in 2013 recorded the collection of 951 plant taxa in just the northwestern Iraqi part of the range.

Being part of the much larger Zagros Mountains forest steppe ecoregion, the Hawraman mountains perfectly represent nearly all the different niches and habitats that can be found in the wider Zagros range on a smaller scale. There is a dramatic shift in elevation in Hawraman between the lush shaded river valleys and the high limestone summits of the mounatins, ranging from around 600 m above sea level at Ahmad Awa village near Khurmal to 3373 m above sea level at the summit of Mt. Shahu above Paveh. This creates a great difference in climate, rainfall, sunlight, soil type, and human interference, leading to the aforementioned floristic diversity.

One of the defining symbols of Hawraman are the lush green valleys featuring rock-terraced groves of walnut (Juglans regia) and pomegranate (Punica granatum). These groves have been maintained and inherited for many generations by the Hawramis and these two valuable products serve as major sources of income for the region. Large old growth walnuts thrive extensively in the valleys because of cultivation nowadays, but they might have originated from wild populations. The shade of the walnuts serves as shelter for growing other fruit trees that don’t tolerate the summer heat of Hawraman, such as the pomegranate, pear, apple, quince, apricot, greengage, plum, grapevine, figs, black mulberry and occasionally persimmon.

Wild trees and shrubs can also be found growing alongside the fruit trees and walnuts, these include Celtis caucasica, Celtis tournefortii, Cercis griffithii, Cornus sanguinea, Cotoneaster luristanica, Crataegus meyeri, Crataegus monogyna, Fraxinus syriaca, Hedera pastuchovii, Populus euphratica, Prunus cerasifera, Rhus coriaria, Rosa canina, Rosa foetida, Rubus caesius, Rubus creticus, Salix acmophylla, Salix alba, Sambucus ebulus, Tamarix ramosissima, and Vitis hissarica. There are also introduced species growing here such as Ailanthus altissima, Populus alba, Populus nigra, and Ziziphus jujuba.

The forest zone in the mountains is similar to all the other forests in Kurdistan, with the lower forest zone almost exclusively dominated by Quercus brantii, the middle forest zone mixed between Quercus brantii and Quercus infectoria, and the high forest zone consisting mostly of Quercus infectoria and Quercus libani. Other species growing along with the oaks are Acer monspessulanum, Crataegus azarolus, Daphne mucronata, Lonicera nummulariifolia, Pistacia eurycarpa, Pistacia khinjuk, Prunus argentea, Prunus mahaleb, Prunus microcarpa, Prunus webbii, Pyrus syriaca, Rhamnus kurdica, and Rosa elymaitica. Some fruits grown in the forest zone include almonds (Prunus amygdalus), peaches (Prunus persica), white mulberries (Morus alba) and grapes (Vitis vinifera). The lower forest zone in some areas is heavily grazed and destroyed leading to the forest cover to shift to coppiced oaks and shrubs that thrive in dry places such as Capparis spinosa, Nerium oleander, Paliurus spina-christi, Prunus arabica, and Rhamnus persica with Ficus carica subsp. rupestris growing among the rocks of intermittent streams.

The high altitude zone above the treeline is only suitable habitat for a number of shrubs and herbs that can handle the harsh winter cold and the summer heat on the rocks. These include species like Daphne mucronata, Prunus brachypetala, Prunus carduchorum, Prunus kotschyi, Prunus lycioides, Rhamnus cornifolia, Rosa iberica, and Rosa orientalis.

=== Cultural Landscape of Uramanat ===
Cultural Landscape of Hawraman or Cultural Landscape of Uramanat is the 26th tangible cultural heritage of Iran.The property is located in the provinces of Kurdistan and Kermanshah along the western border of Iran.

The Uramanat Villages are located in the mountainous Kermanshah and Kurdistan Provinces of Iran and Halabja Governorate of Iraqi Kurdistan. The villages are unique in terms of architecture, lifestyle, and agricultural methodology. Villages are integrated with nature by incorporating steep-slope agriculture. The 12 villages included in the property illustrate the Hawrami people's evolving responses to the scarcity of productive land in their mountainous environment through the millennia. On July 28, 2021,

This site was first added to the UNESCO World Heritage Tentative List on August 9, 2007. On July 27, 2021, it along with part of the Hawraman region were officially inscribed on the World Heritage List as a cultural site under the name "Cultural Landscape of Hawraman/Uramanat".

Hawraman Cultural Landscape was inscribed on the UNESCO World Heritage List as the 26th tangible cultural heritage of Iran at the 44th session of the UNESCO World Heritage Committee.

== Gallery ==
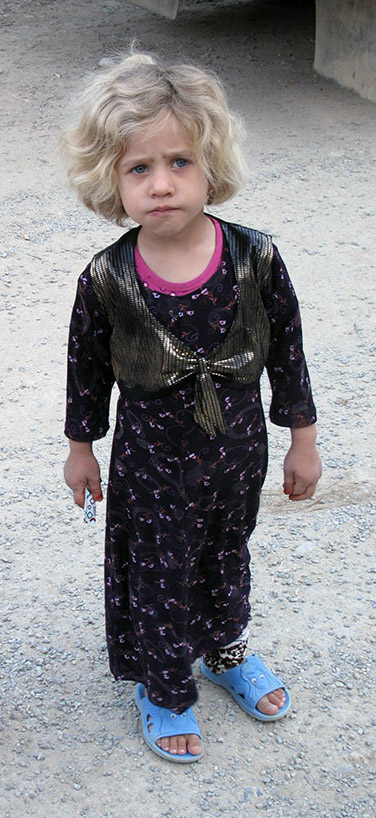
A Hawrami child in Kurdish clothing.

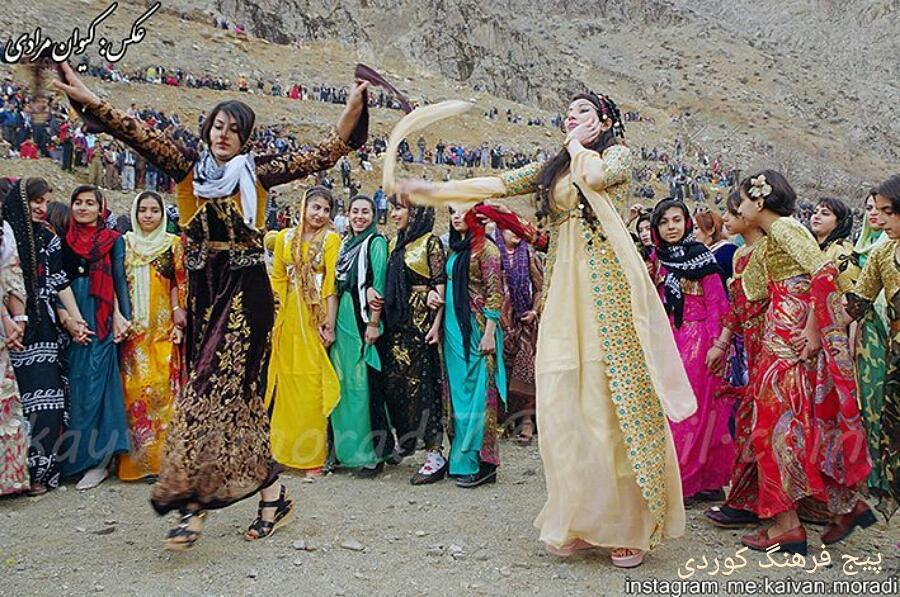
Kurdish dance at Hawraman, Kurdistan.

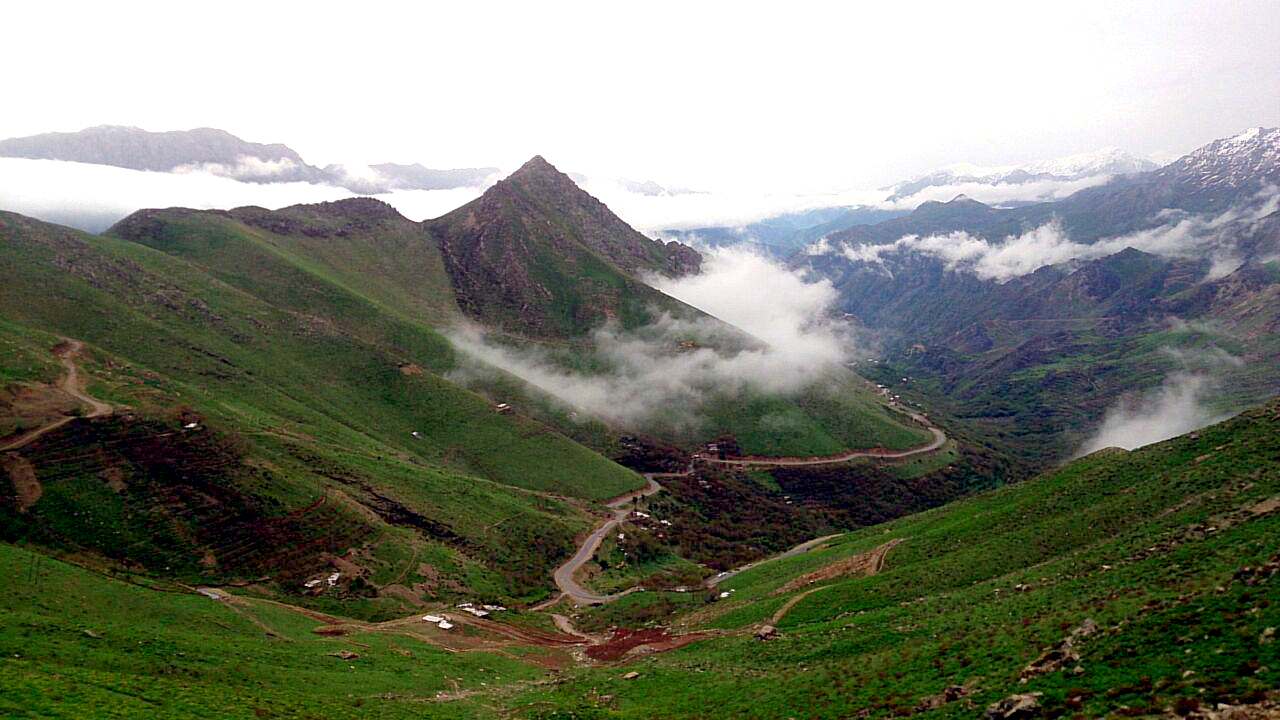
A typical landscape of the Hawraman region, Kurdistan.

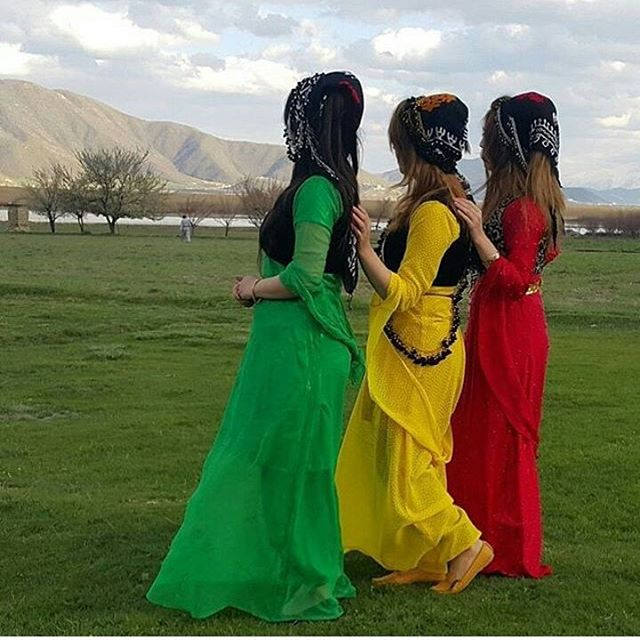
Kurdish cloth from Hawraman.

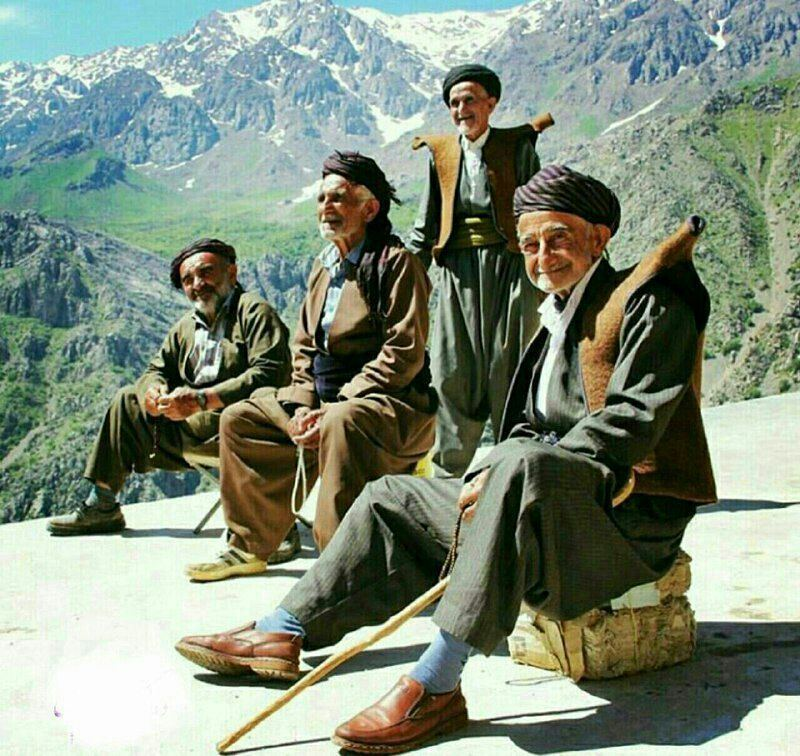
A group of Kurdish men with traditional clothing at Hawraman, Kurdistan.

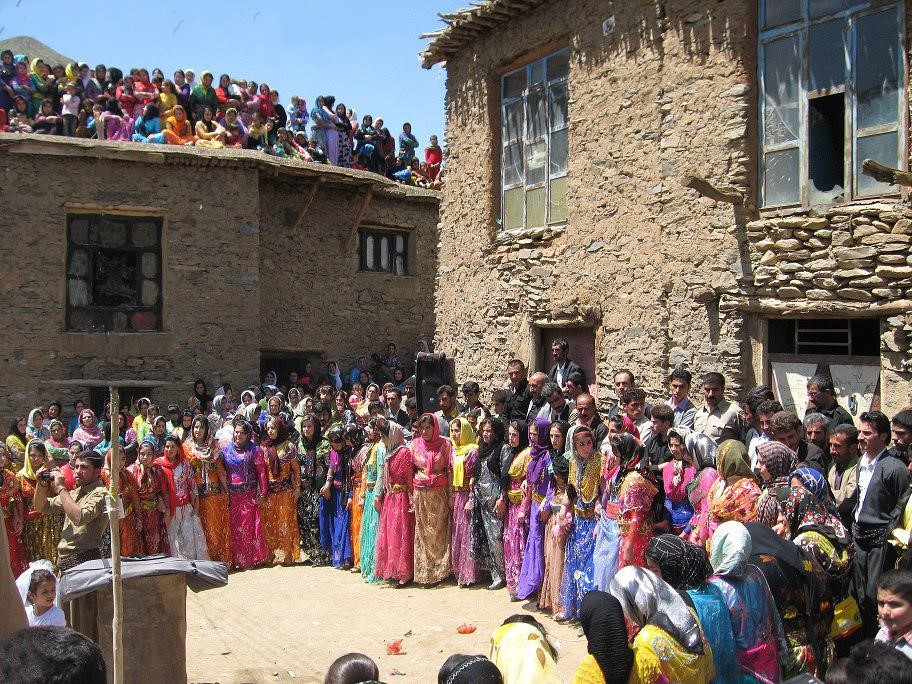
Wedding ceremony at a Kurdish village.

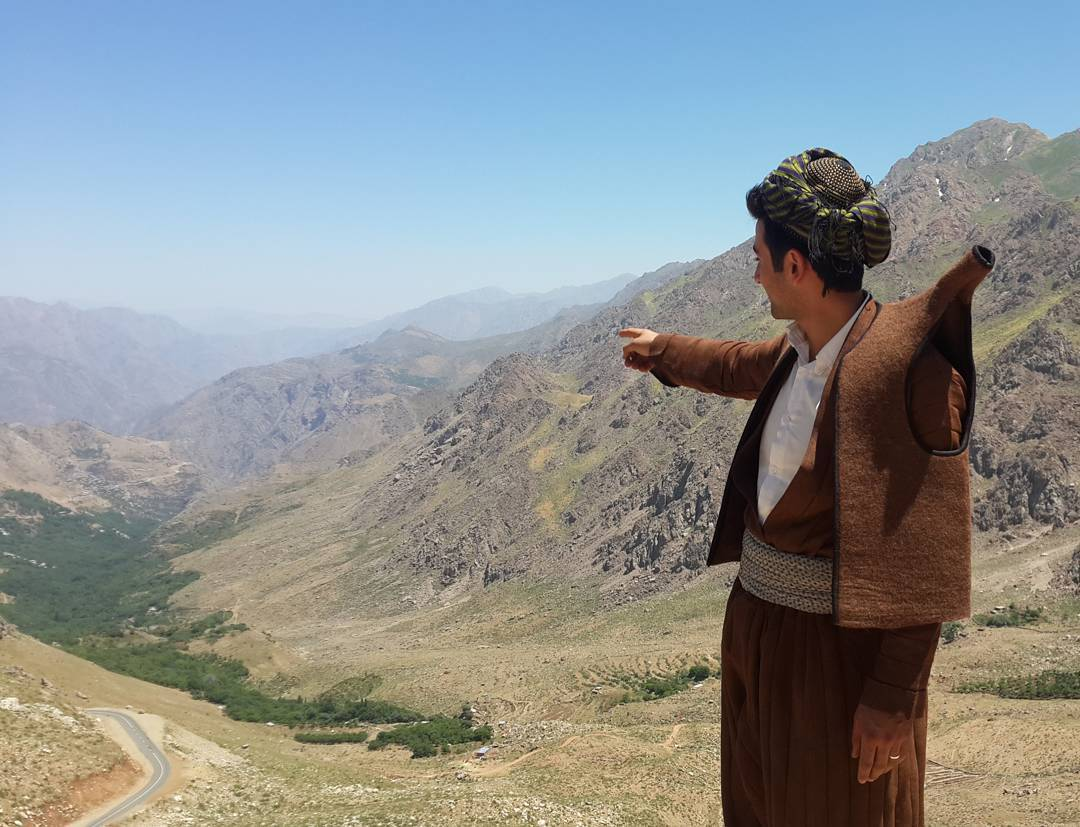
A Hawrami man with traditional clothing, Kurdistan.

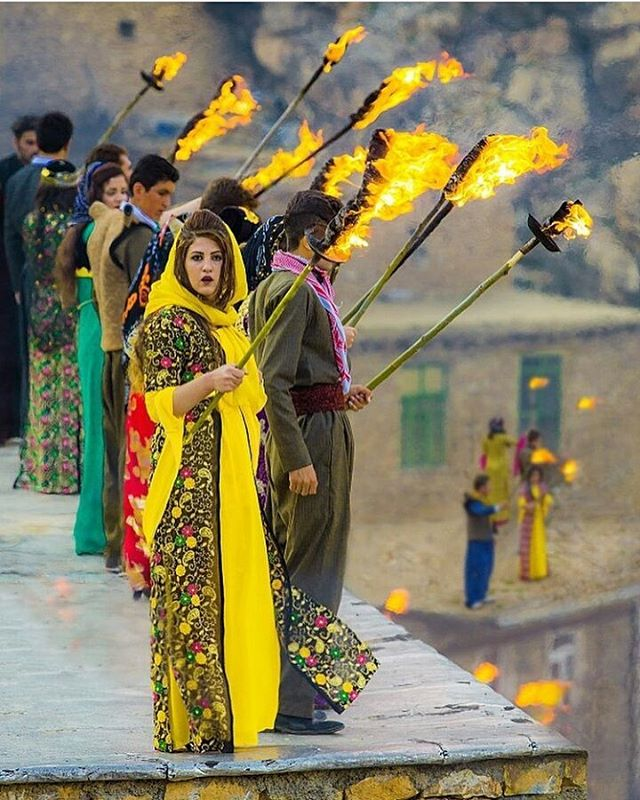
Kurdish New Year ceremony of Newroz, Palangan village, Hawraman, Kurdistan.
