= Cultural Landscape of Uramanat =

Uramanat Villages
- Villages
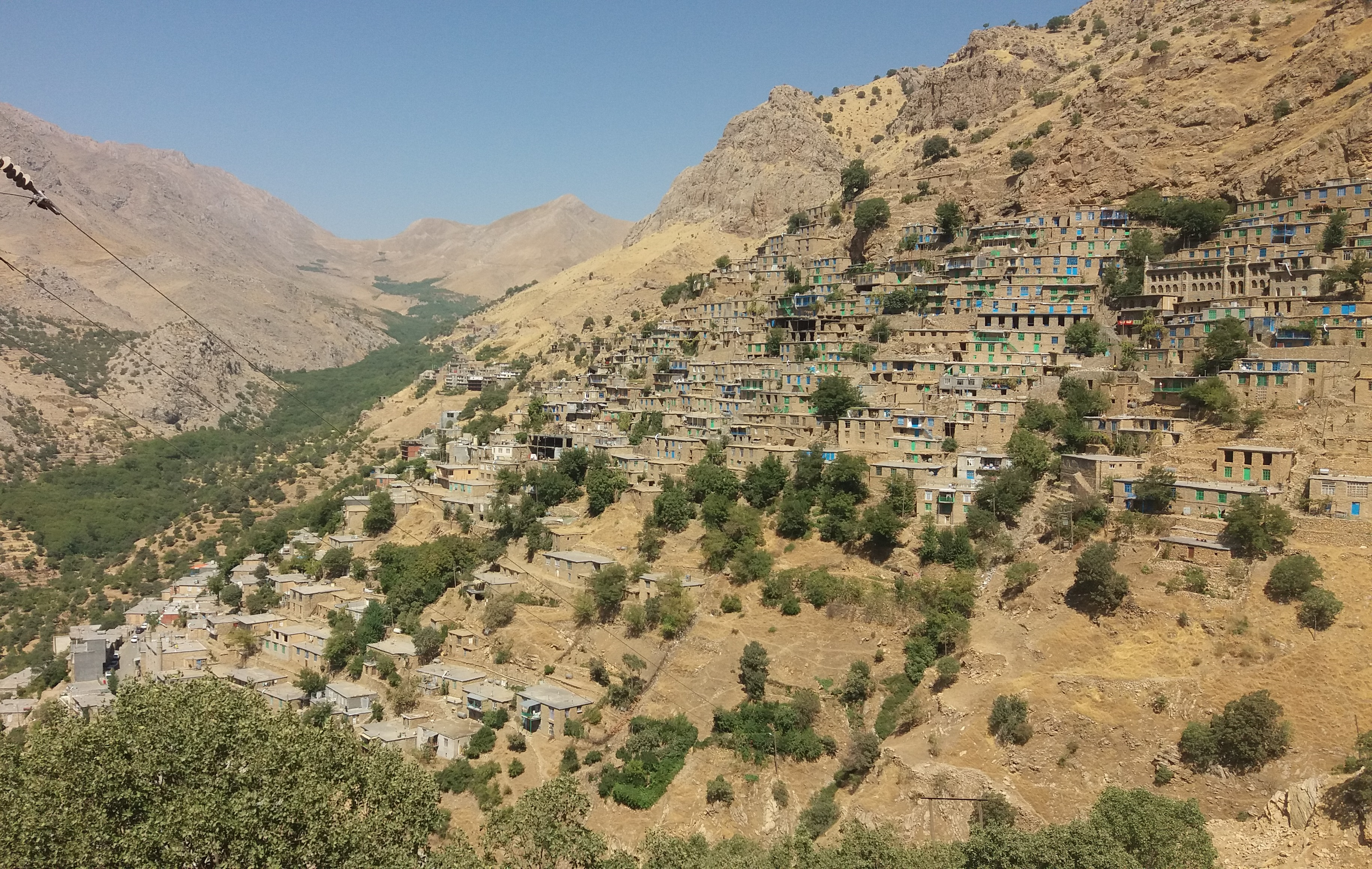
- Uraman Takht, Kurdistan, Iran
- Interactive map of Uramanat Villages
- Countries: Iran; Iraq
- Region: Kermanshah and Kurdistan Provinces of Iran; Halabja Governorate of Iraqi Kurdistan

UNESCO World Heritage Site
- Official name: Cultural Landscape of Hawraman/Uramanat
- Location: Parts of the region in Iran
- Criteria: Cultural: (iii)(v)
- Reference: 1647
- Inscription: 2021 (44th Session)

Cultural Landscape of Hawraman or Cultural Landscape of Uramanat is the 26th tangible cultural heritage of Iran. This remote and mountainous landscape bears testimony to the traditional culture of the Hawrami people, an agropastoral Kurdish tribe that has inhabited the region since about 3000 BCE. The property, at the heart of the Zagros Mountains in the provinces of Kurdistan and Kermanshah along the western border of Iran.

The Uramanat Villages are located in the mountainous Kermanshah and Kurdistan Provinces of Iran and Halabja Governorate of Iraqi Kurdistan. The villages are unique in terms of architecture, lifestyle, and agricultural methodology. Villages are integrated with nature by incorporating steep-slope agriculture. The 12 villages included in the property illustrate the Hawrami people’s evolving responses to the scarcity of productive land in their mountainous environment through the millennia.

== History ==
The earliest archaeological evidence shows that the region was inhabited by humans since Middle Paleolithic Period (more than 40,000 years ago). This evidence was discovered by archaeologists near Hajij village and between Naw and Asparez villages in the Sirwan valley. Evidence for Late Paleolithic occupation discovered in a cave site called Kenacheh in the Perdi Mala valley. These archaeological finds were unearthed during Darian Dam Archaeological Salvage Program that conducted several seasons of archaeological surveys and excavations within the area of the reservoir that led to the discovery of a number of important Paleolithic and more later sites. The Main excavated sites were Dārāi Rockshelter (Middle Paleolithic), Kenācheh Cave (Upper Paleolithic), Ruwār tomb (Iron Age), Sar Cham (Chalcolithic and Iron Age), and Barda Mār (19th century). Except for Ruwar sites, all other excavated sites were flooded in 2015-2016. The Inscription of Sargon II at Tang-i Var pass near the village of Tang-i Var, indicate that the region was occupied by Assyrians during their military campaigns into Zagros. This Royal Inscriptions belongs to Sargon II, King of Assyria (721–705 BC).

The Parchments of Avroman, a set of three documents from the Seleucid and Parthian eras, were found in the region in 1909. They were discovered in a cave on Kuh-e Salan Mountain, near the village of Shar Hawraman, and subsequently sent to London. The documents date from 88/87 BC to 33 AD, with two written in Greek and one in Parthian. They document the sale of a vineyard and another land, and include the names of Pātaspak, son of Tīrēn and Awīl, son of Baænīn.

== World Heritage status ==
This site was first added to the UNESCO World Heritage Tentative List on August 9, 2007. On July 27, 2021, it along with part of the Hawraman region were officially inscribed on the World Heritage List as a cultural site under the name "Cultural Landscape of Hawraman/Uramanat".

Hawraman Cultural Landscape was inscribed on the UNESCO World Heritage List as the 26th tangible cultural heritage of Iran at the 44th session of the UNESCO World Heritage Committee.
