= Rescue archaeology =

Type of archaeological survey or excavation

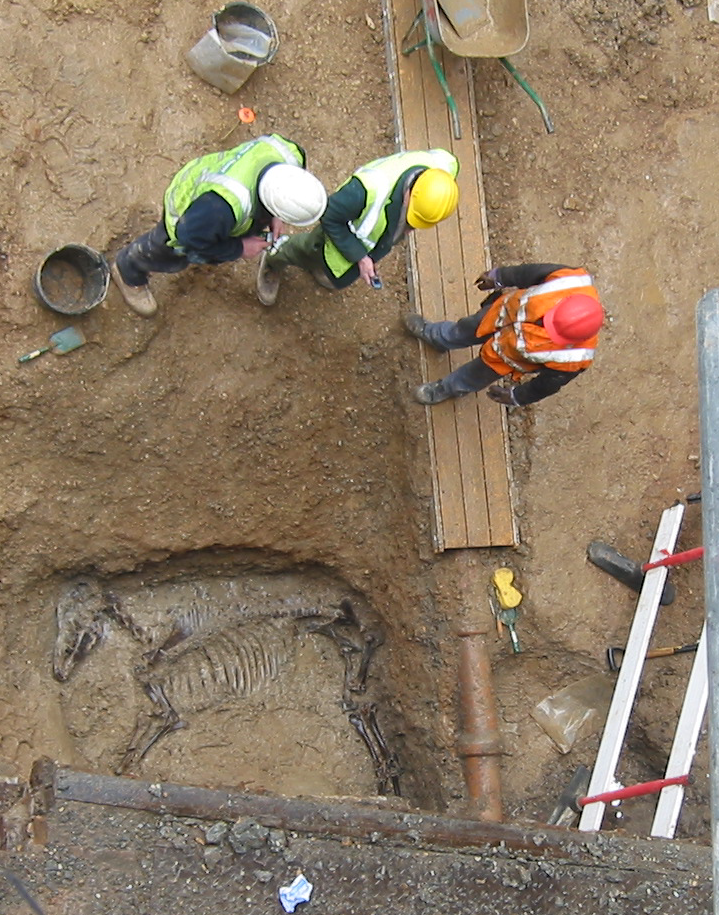
Horse grave in a Roman moat in the heart of London, England

Rescue archaeology, sometimes called commercial archaeology, preventive archaeology, salvage archaeology, contract archaeology, developer-funded archaeology, or compliance archaeology, is state-sanctioned, archaeological survey and excavation carried out as part of the planning process in advance of construction or other land development. In Western Europe, excavation is the final stage in a sequence of activities that starts with desk-based assessments of the archaeological potential through exploratory fieldwork: monument surveys, test pitting, shovel pitting, evaluations, and so forth. Other, less common causes for salvage digs can be looting and illegal construction.

Conditions leading to rescue archaeology could include, but are not limited to, road and other major construction, the floodplain of a proposed dam, or even before the onset of war. Unlike traditional survey and excavation, rescue archaeology must be undertaken at speed. Rescue archaeology is included in the broader categories of cultural resource management (CRM) and cultural heritage management (CHM).

== Background ==
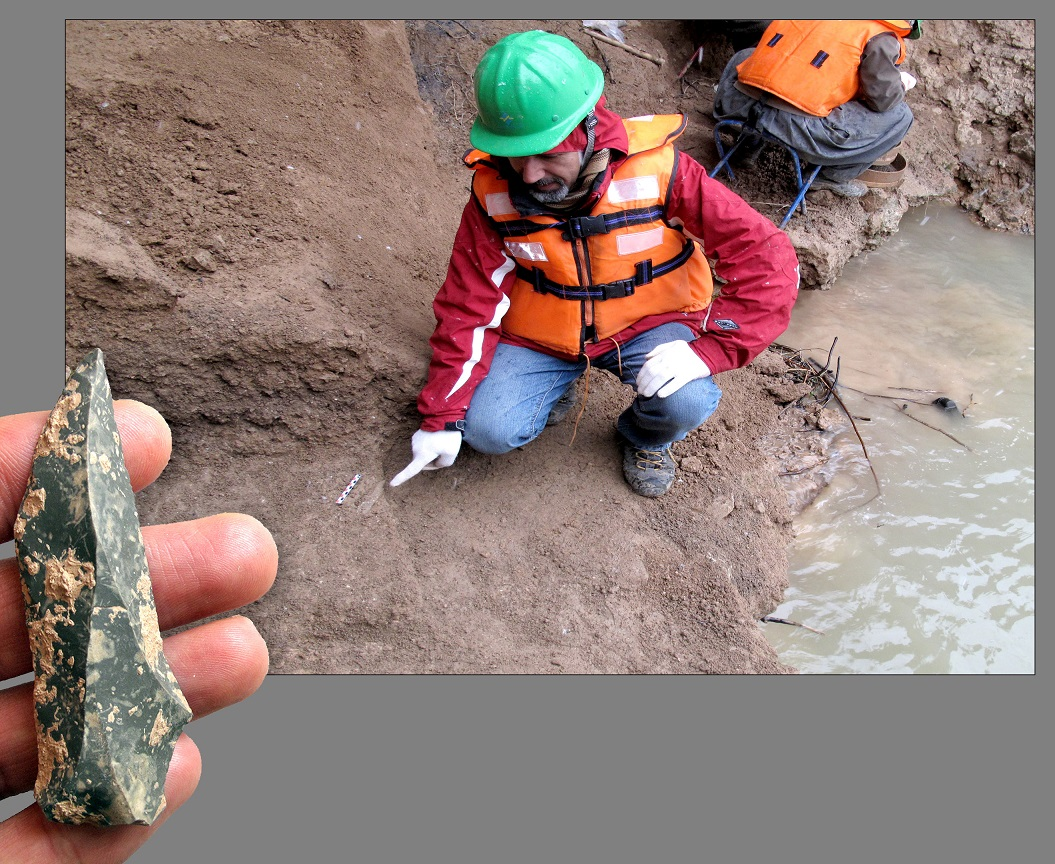
Salvage excavations at the Darai Rockshelter. A team member marks the in situ position of a Middle Paleolithic stone tool.

Rescue archaeology occurs on sites about to be destroyed but, on occasion, may include in situ preservation of any finds or protective measures taken to preserve an unexcavated site beneath a building. Urban areas with many overlaid years of habitation are often candidates for rescue archaeology. The focus of early work was to set up organisations to undertake rescue excavations shortly before an area was disturbed by construction equipment. Archaeologists relied on the goodwill of the developer to provide the opportunity to record remains. In the present day, an archaeological survey may be required by planning process or building law, as with the National Planning Policy Framework (NPPF) in the UK. Common conditions required by planning authorities are archaeological field surveys, watching briefs, shovel test pits, trial trenching, and excavation. Guidance and standards of practice in the UK are largely monitored through the Chartered Institute for Archaeologists (CIfA).

Contract or commercial archaeology services have sprung up to meet the needs of developers and to comply with local laws and planning regulations.

== See also ==
- Cultural heritage management
- Cultural resources management
- Garbology, the study of modern refuse and trash
- Rescue (British Archaeological Trust)
- Valletta Treaty
