= Ectoedemia spinosella =

Scientific classification
- Kingdom: Animalia
- Phylum: Arthropoda
- Clade: Pancrustacea
- Class: Insecta
- Order: Lepidoptera
- Family: Nepticulidae
- Genus: Ectoedemia
- Species: E. spinosella

Binomial name
- Ectoedemia spinosella (de Joannis, 1908)

Synonyms
- Nepticula spinosella de Joannis, 1908; Ectoedemia albiformae Puplesis & Diskus, 2003

Species of moth

Ectoedemia spinosella is a moth of the family Nepticulidae. It is found in southern Europe, reaching in the north to the southern part of Great Britain, the Netherlands, central Germany and Poland. It has also been recorded from the Crimea, the Caucasus and the European part of the former Soviet Union. It is common in western Turkmenistan.

The wingspan is 3.2-4.9 mm for males and 3.4–5 mm for females. Adults are on wing in August and October.

Larvae are pale white. Additionally they have a head capsule and, chewing mouthparts with opposable mandibles. They feed on Prunus cerasifera, Prunus domestica, Prunus dulcis, Prunus fruticosa, Prunus spinosa and Prunus webbii. They mine the leaves of their host plant.

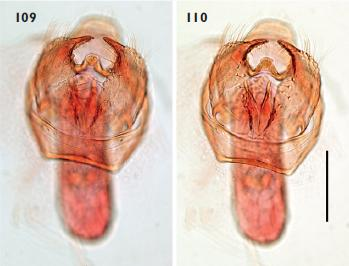
Male genitalia
