= Shaho =

Mountain in Iran

Coordinates: 35°06′N 46°24′E

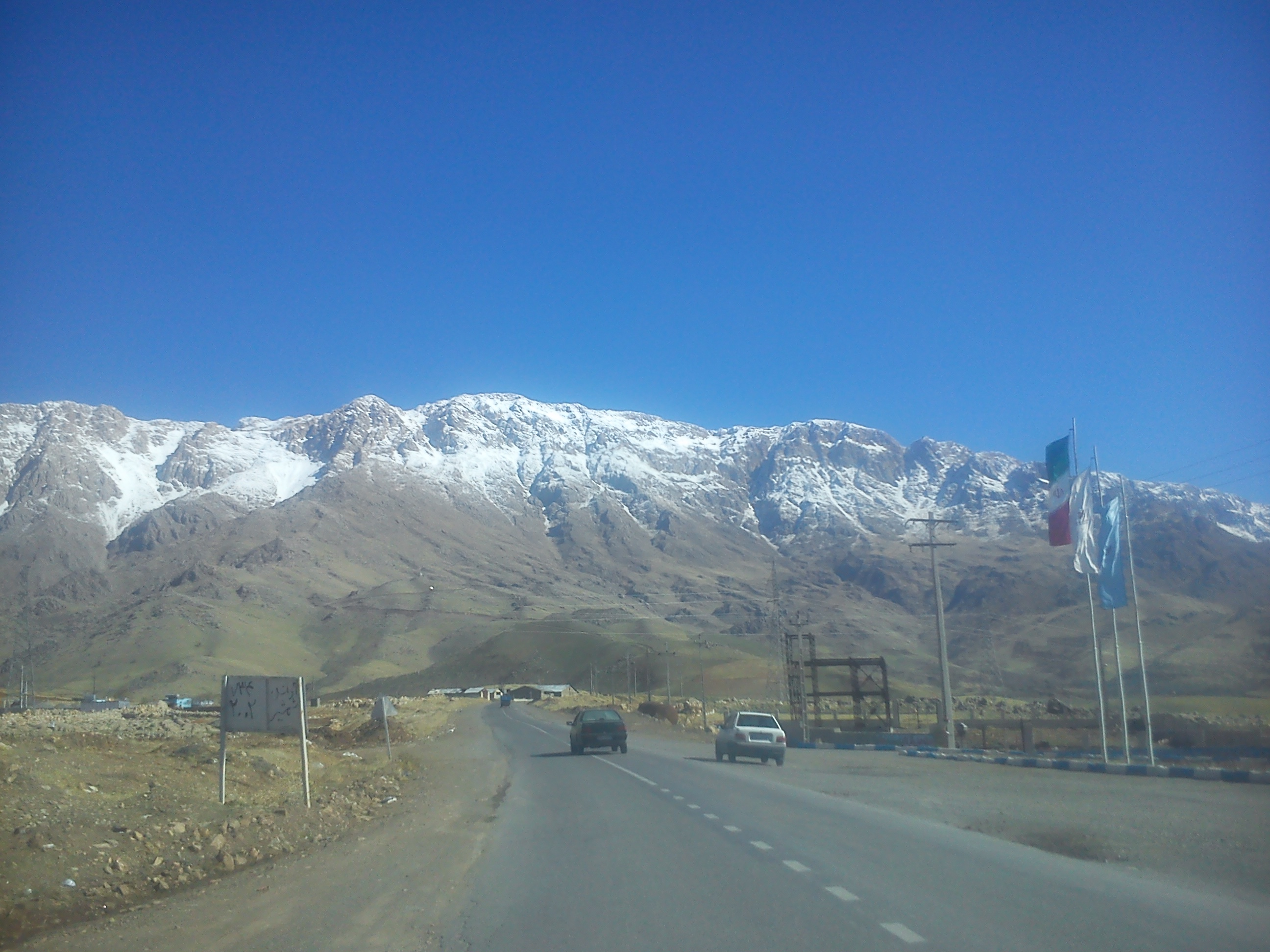
- Shaho means place of King

Highest point
- Elevation: 3,400 m (11,200 ft)

Geography
- Location within Iran
- Location: Paveh County Kermanshah Iran
- Parent range: Zagros Mountains

Climbing
- Easiest route: western front

Shaho (Persian: شاهو, Kurdish: شاھۆ ,Şaho) is a mountain of the central Zagros Mountains range in western Iran. It is located among the cities of Kamyaran, Sarvabad, Marivan, Nowdeshah, Nowsud, Paveh, Javanrud, Ravansar in the district of Kurdistan and Kermanshah provinces. The highest peak of this mountain is called Havi Khani, located at an elevation of 3400 meters. Some of the other highest peaks are Zavoli (3205 meters), Pir Kheder (3090 meters), and Nour (3110 meters). The Shaho mountain is close to the Sirvan River.

This area contains notable villages such as Hajij, Shamshir, Palangan and Hawraman Takht.

'Shaho' is a rather popular male name in the Kurdish speaking cities of Iran.

Bears, foxes, jackals, wolves, pigs, rabbits, antelope and Partridges are usual animals of this mount.

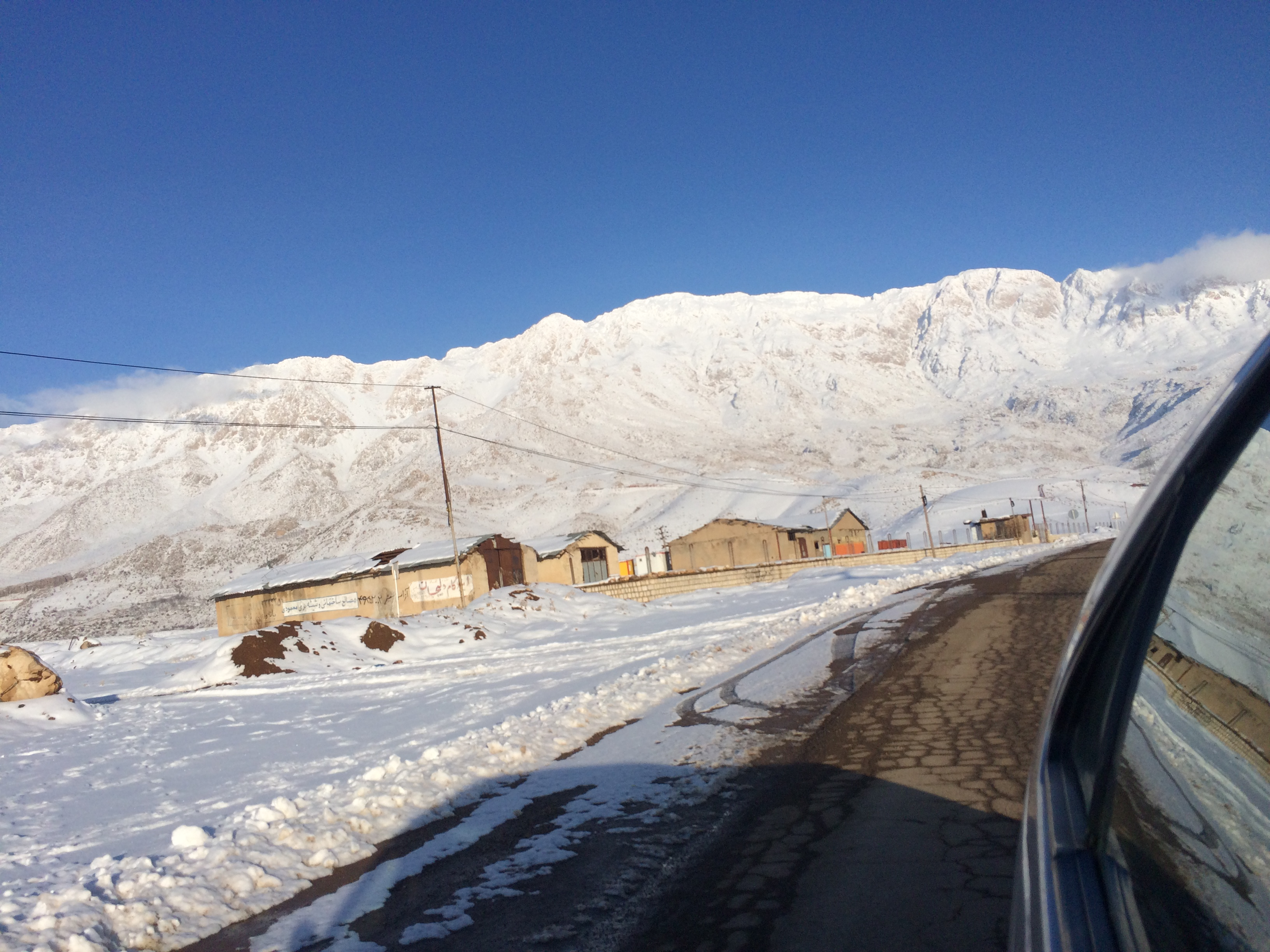
A view from inside the car Shaho Mountain
