= Kenacheh Cave =

Archaeological site in Iran

Kenacheh
- Maro Kenachi
- Location in Iran
- 35°09′47″N 46°22′01″E
- Type: cave
- Periods: Upper Paleolithic, Epipalaeolithic
- Cultures: Baradostian, Zarzian
- Associated with: Homo Sapiens
- Location: Kurdistan Province, Iran
- Region: Hawraman

History
- Built: ca. 35,000 BP
- Abandoned: ca. 12,000 BP

Site notes
- Elevation: 760 m (2,490 ft)
- Excavation dates: 2015
- Archaeologists: Sonia Shidrang, Fereidoun Biglari
- Condition: inundated
- Owner: Ministry of Cultural Heritage, Tourism and Handicrafts, Iran

Kenacheh Cave (Persian: کناچه, Kurdish:مرو کناچی) is an archaeological site in the southwest of Kurdistan Province, in west Iran. It is located in the Sirwan River valley, between Naw and Asparez villages, in the Hawraman region. It faces NNW at an altitude of 770m a.s.l.The cave was discovered during Darian Dam Archaeological Salvage Program in 2015, excavated in 2015, and it was subsequently submerged in 2016.

The Darian Dam Archaeological Salvage Program (DDASP) was initiated by the Iranian Center for Archaeological Research before the impoundment of the Darian Dam reservoir. Directed by Fereidoun Biglari, the program undertook multiple seasons of systematic surveys and excavations across the endangered reservoir area. These efforts resulted in the discovery of numerous significant sites, including key Paleolithic caves and rock shelters, and settlements from later periods.

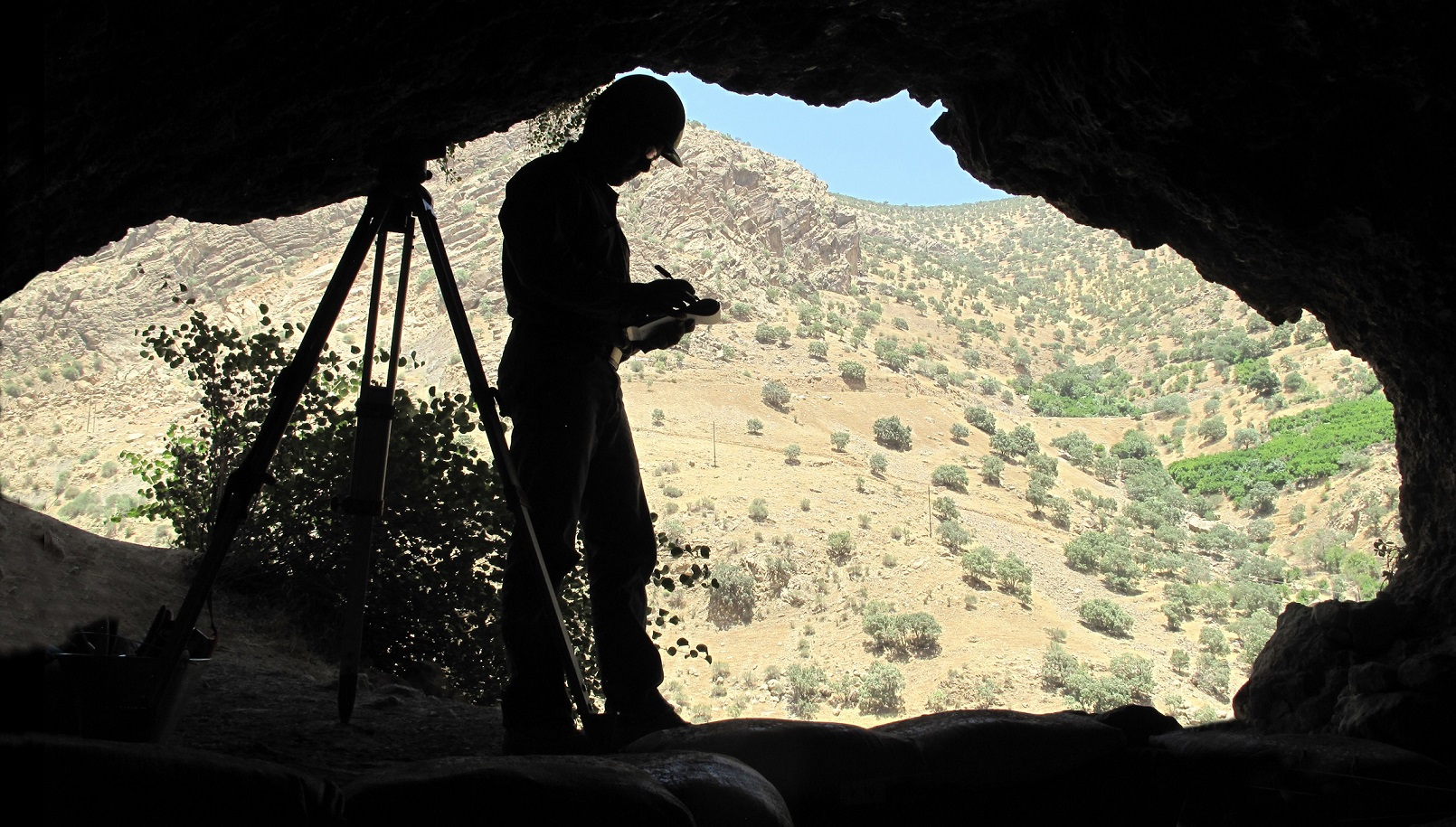
The entrance of Kenacheh Cave, Hawraman Mountains, 2015

== Archaeology ==
Excavations at Kenacheh Cave uncovered a 2.5-meter archaeological sequence spanning Late Upper Paleolithic (UP) and Epipaleolithic (EP) occupations. Analysis of recovered materials indicates intensive site activities including butchering, cooking, and consumption of predominantly wild caprines (goat/sheep), plant processing, and the manufacture and maintenance of stone tools.

Typo-technological studies of Kenacheh's lithic assemblages reveal strong parallels with UP-EP industries documented across the Zagros region. The cave's Upper Paleolithic industry is characterized by small twisted bladelet production primarily from carinated burins, with toolkits dominated by small Dufour bladelets and end scrapers.

Recent research on Yafteh Cave assemblages further contextualizes these findings, identifying at least two major phases within the Zagros's Baradostian tradition. The Early Baradostian phase features assemblages oriented toward Arjeneh point production and relatively large, straight or slightly curved Dufour bladelets. The Late Baradostian phase—closely resembling Kenacheh's industry—shows dominance of carinated burins used to detach small twisted bladelets, which were subsequently retouched into small twisted Dufour bladelets via inverse or alternate techniques.
