= Darian Dam Archaeological Salvage Program =

Darian Dam was constructed on the Sirwan River between 2009 and 2015. The Dam is located in the Hawrāmān region of Kurdistan and Kermanshah. The Darian Dam Archeological Salvage Program (DDASP) was planned by the Iranian Center for Archaeological Research before flooding the reservoir.

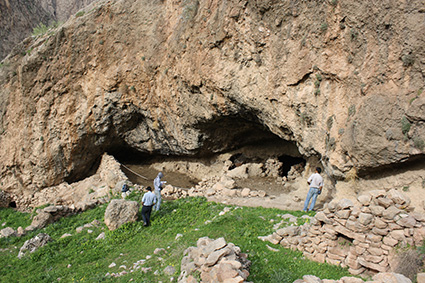
A Middle Paleolithic rockshelter site near Hajij village

This archaeological program, under the general direction of Fereidoun Biglari, has conducted several seasons of archaeological surveys and excavations within the area of the reservoir that led to the discovery of many important Paleolithic and more later sites. The Main excavated sites were Darai Rockshelter (Middle Paleolithic), Kenacheh Cave (Upper Paleolithic), Ruwār tomb (Iron Age), Sar Cham (Chalcolithic and Iron Age), and Barda Mār (19th century). Except for Ruwar sites, all other excavated sites were flooded in 2015–2016.

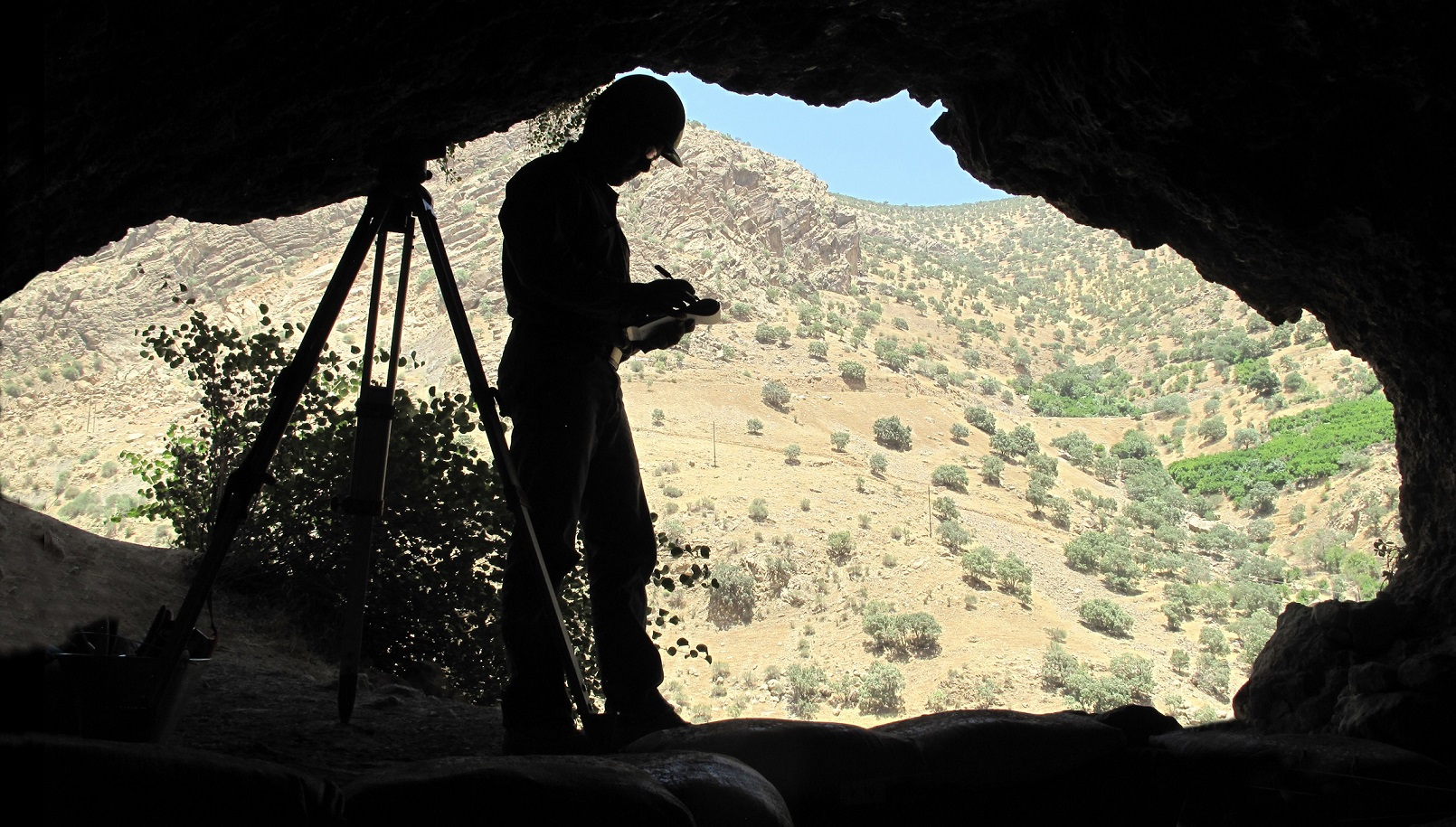
The Upper/Epipaleolithic cave site of Kenacheh, Sirwan valley, Hawraman

The results of these salvage excavations were presented at the First National Congress on Archaeology of Hawraman: Archaeological Salvage Excavations at the Darian Dam Reservoir in May 2018 at Kurdistan University. Some of the results of the research conducted in the area of the Darian Dam were presented at a special seminar hosted by the Iranology Foundation in December 2021

Publications

- Adams, Jenny L. and Amir Saed Mucheshi, (2020) The persistence of plastering technology: Defining plastering stones as a distinctive handstone category, Journal of Archaeological Science: Reports, Volume 31,102344, ISSN 2352-409X, The persistence of plastering technology: Defining plastering stones as a distinctive handstone category.
- Biglari, F., (2021) Construction de barrage et archéologie de sauvetage dans le Zagros, ARCHÉOLOGIA 595: 10–11.
- Biglari, F., S. Shidrang et al. (2017) Survey and salvage excavations at the Darian Dam Reservoir, Hawraman, Kurdistan and Kermanshah, Proceedings of the 15th annual archaeological Symposium of Iran, pp. 49–54, Iranian Center for Archaeological Research (ICAR), Research Institute of Cultural Heritage & Tourism (RICHT), Tehran
- Biglari, F and S. Shidrang (2019) Rescuing the Paleolithic Heritage of Hawraman, Kurdistan, Iranian Zagros, Near Eastern Archaeology 82 (4): 226–235.https://doi.org/10.1086/706536
- Ghasimi, T,(2019) Ruwar: an Iron Age tomb at Hawraman, Kurdistan, Mehr-e Parseh 16:109-111.
- Ghasimi, Taher, et al. (2021). Ruwar Tomb: New Insights into Material Culture, Burial Practice and Bioarchaeology of the Iron Age Communities in the Hawraman Mountains, Kurdistan, Iran, Bulletin of Miho Museum 21:111-122.
- Fiddaman et al.2023, Ancient chicken remains reveal the origins of virulence in Marek's disease virus. Science 382,1276-1281(2023).DOI:10.1126/science.adg2238
- Manca, L., Mashkour, M., & Ghasimi, T. (2023). Between land and sea. The exploitation of marine shells from the Neolithic to the Iron Age in Iran: the site of Ruwar (northwest of Iran). PALEO. Revue d'archéologie préhistorique, (Hors-série), 112–129.
- Tehrani, N., M. Mashkour, and F. Biglari, 2018. Ethnoarchaeological studies in the Naw village and the Asparez valley, an attempt to identify seasonal migration patterns and environmental exploitation in prehistoric Hawraman, presented in the First National Congress on Archaeology of Hawraman: Archaeological Salvage Excavations at the Darian Dam Reservoir, Ferdosi Hall, Faculty of Humanities and Social Sciences, University of Kurdistan, Sanandaj.
- Saed Mucheshi. A., and S. Khalifeh Soltani, (2019) Shiran: a submerged Iron Age grave in the Darian dam, Hawraman, Kurdistan. In Y. Hassanzadeh, Y. and Vahdati, A.A. and Karimi, Z. (eds.), Proceedings of the international conference on the Iron Age in western Iran and neighboring regions, Vol. 2: 215–226, Tehran, RICHT.
- Saed Mucheshi A, Esna-Ashari A, Rahmati S M, Bahadori R, Madani F S. (2019) Compositional Study of the Potteries from Sarcham, Bardemar and Kenacheh Sites, Hawraman Area, Kurdistan Province, Iran. Journal of Research on Archaeometry 5 (1):105-127. URL: مطالعه ساختاری سفال های منطقه هورامان استان کردستان (محوطه های سرچم، برده مار و کناچه)

== See also ==
- Diyala River
- Hawraman
- Darbandikhan Dam
