= Parchments of Avroman =

Ancient documents

The Parchments of Avroman (or Awraman) are three parchment documents, found in 1909 in a cave in the Hawraman region of Iranian Kurdistan. They were found in Tang-i Var, Kuh-e Salan Mountain (Kurdish: کۆساڵان), near the village of Shahr Hawraman. The documents were found in a sealed jar by a villager, and then taken to London by Sa'eed Kurdistani in October 1913.

Avroman Parchment I, document A

The documents date from 88/87 BC to 33 AD, with two written in Greek and one in Parthian. They document the sale of a vineyard and other land, and include the names of Pātaspak, son of Tīrēn and Awīl, son of Baænīn. The Greek documents were translated and studied by philologist Ellis H. Minns in 1915. The Parthian document was translated by several years later by Cowley, and studied more recently by Livschits.
