= Paveh =

City in Kermanshah province, Iran

Paveh Persian: پاوه
- City
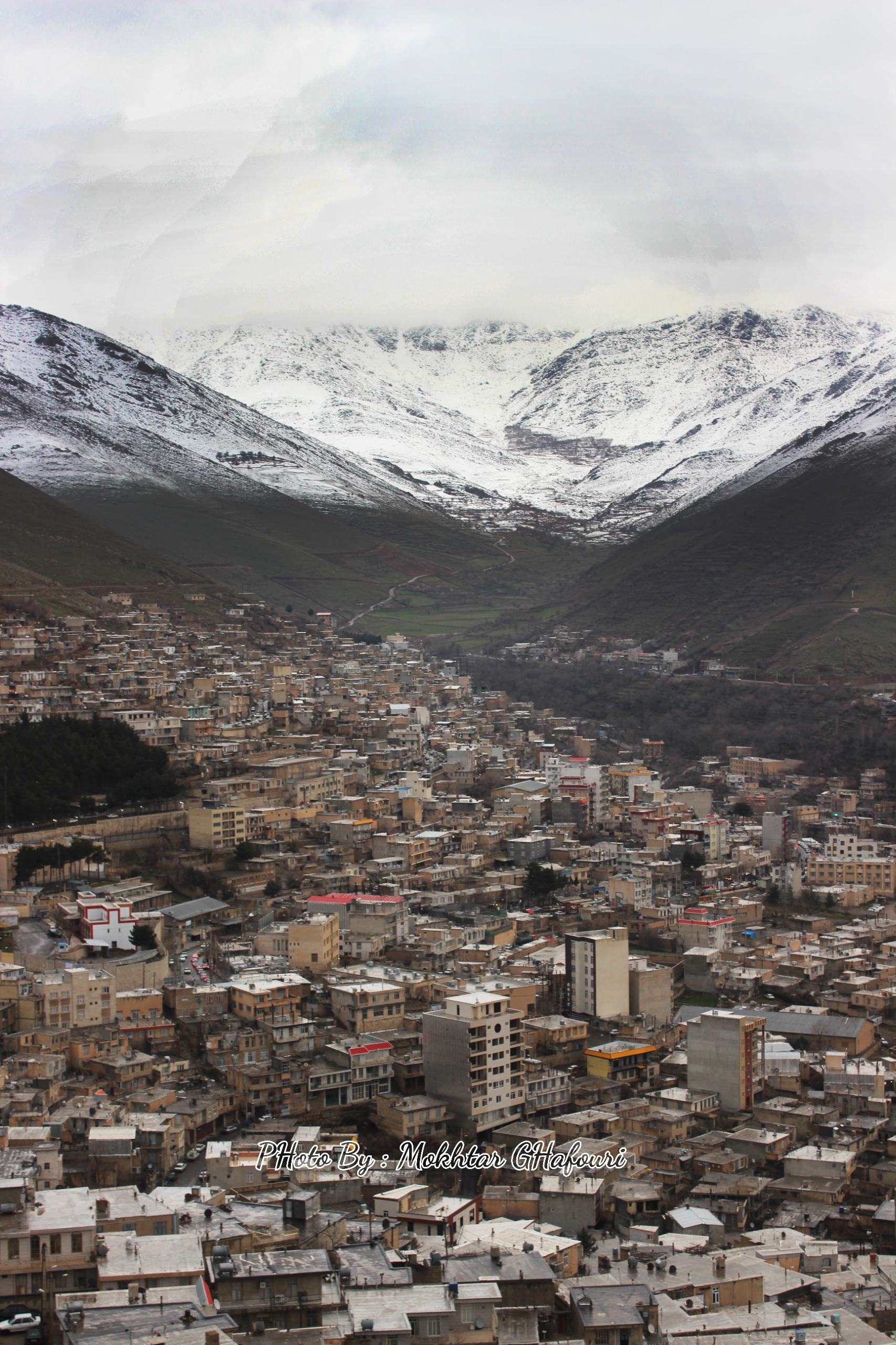
- Paveh

- Location within Iran
- Coordinates: 35°02′36″N 46°21′18″E
- Country: Iran
- Province: Kermanshah
- County: Paveh
- District: Central
- Elevation: 1,560 m (5,120 ft)

Population (2016)
  - Total: 25,771
- Time zone: UTC+3:30 (IRST)
- Area code: +(98)83

Paveh (Persian and Kurdish: پاوه) (Note: Also romanized as Pāveh, Pawah, and Pāweh; also known as Pâve and Pawe) is a city in the Central District of Paveh County, Kermanshah province, Iran, serving as capital of both the county and the district. It is in a region called Hawraman.

== History ==
An old myth regarding the name of the city is that the Emperor Yazdgerd III sent his son named Pav to this area to renew his religious Zoroastrian faith. Both Persians and the local Gorans practiced Zoroastrianism during the Sasanian Empire from which this myth is derived.

== Demographics ==
=== Language ===
The inhabitants of Paveh are Kurds and speak Hawrami (also: Gorani). They follow the Shafi‘i branch of Sunni Islam. The first language spoken by the population in the city is mostly Gorani language, but the language that is used in schools and offices is Persian, the official language of Iran in which almost everyone in the city is fluent.

=== Population ===
At the time of the 2006 National Census, the city's population was 19,774 in 5,171 households. The following census in 2011 counted 23,704 people in 6,723 households. The 2016 census measured the population of the city as 25,771 people in 7,932 households.

== Geography ==
=== Location and topography ===
Paveh is located in western Iran and is 112 km far from Kermanshah. It lies in a sub-region along the Iran-Iraq border commonly referred to as Hewraman, which is situated within the larger geographical region of Kurdistan. The city is considered by inhabitants of the region as the capital of Hewraman.

=== Climate ===
Paveh has a Mediterranean climate (Csa) according to the Köppen climate classification.

Climate data for Paveh (normals and extremes for 1992-2021)
Month	Jan	Feb	Mar	Apr	May	Jun	Jul	Aug	Sep	Oct	Nov	Dec	Year
Record high °C (°F)	17.7 (63.9)	19.4 (66.9)	27.4 (81.3)	29.3 (84.7)	35.6 (96.1)	40.0 (104.0)	40.9 (105.6)	41.4 (106.5)	39.1 (102.4)	38.4 (101.1)	28.9 (84.0)	21.0 (69.8)	41.4 (106.5)
Mean daily maximum °C (°F)	7.3 (45.1)	7.0 (44.6)	11.5 (52.7)	16.0 (60.8)	22.0 (71.6)	29.4 (84.9)	33.9 (93.0)	35.2 (95.4)	31.7 (89.1)	25.4 (77.7)	16.6 (61.9)	9.9 (49.8)	20.5 (68.9)
Daily mean °C (°F)	4.3 (39.7)	3.8 (38.8)	7.1 (44.8)	11.6 (52.9)	16.9 (62.4)	24.0 (75.2)	28.6 (83.5)	29.9 (85.8)	26.3 (79.3)	20.2 (68.4)	12.5 (54.5)	6.3 (43.3)	16.0 (60.7)
Mean daily minimum °C (°F)	0.9 (33.6)	0.2 (32.4)	3.1 (37.6)	7.1 (44.8)	11.9 (53.4)	18.1 (64.6)	22.3 (72.1)	23.8 (74.8)	20.4 (68.7)	14.9 (58.8)	8.2 (46.8)	2.9 (37.2)	11.2 (52.1)
Record low °C (°F)	−12.0 (10.4)	−14.8 (5.4)	−12.0 (10.4)	−7.0 (19.4)	0.7 (33.3)	7.0 (44.6)	13.0 (55.4)	15.0 (59.0)	10.0 (50.0)	2.4 (36.3)	−10.0 (14.0)	−11.0 (12.2)	−14.8 (5.4)
Average precipitation mm (inches)	97.1 (3.82)	145.4 (5.72)	116.2 (4.57)	129.4 (5.09)	68.0 (2.68)	6.6 (0.26)	1.0 (0.04)	0.8 (0.03)	1.3 (0.05)	13.9 (0.55)	107.9 (4.25)	109.7 (4.32)	797.3 (31.38)
Average precipitation days (≥ 0)	9.7	12.3	10.8	12.5	10.6	2.0	0.5	1.0	0.5	3.0	10.3	10.8	84
Source: Kermanshah Meteorological Office (precipitation days 2010-2021)

The town is encircled by fruit gardens. Paveh is situated along a mountainside like most cities and villages in the Hewraman region. Behind the city is the Shaho mountain and ahead of the city is a view of Atashgah, another mountain that was once the site of pilgrimages for ancient religions in the region. Among the most visited places is the Quri Qaleh caveman which is considered as the longest watery cave in the Middle East. The cave is located around 25 kilometers from Paveh's city center.

== Landmarks ==
=== Rivers ===
Sirwan River is one of the biggest rivers in Paveh. It rises near Sanandaj, in the Zagros Mountains of Iran. It then descends through the mountains, where for some 32 km it forms the border between the two countries. It finally feeds into the Tigris below Baghdad. Navigation of the upper reaches of the Diyala is not possible because of its narrow defiles, but the river's valley provides an important trade route between Iran and Iraq.

=== Mountains ===
Paveh is established among mountains on Zagros Mountains. The mountain chain of Shaho is located in the west of Paveh. Shaho is the highest mountain in Kermanshah province with an elevation of 3390.

== Notable people ==
- Mirza Ebdilqadire Paweyi

== See also ==
- Rawansar
- Javanrud
- Media related to Paveh at Wikimedia Commons
