= Mirza Ebdilqadire Paweyi =

- Born: 1850; Paweh, Iran
- Died: 1910 (aged 59–60); Kermanshah, Iran
- Citizenship: Iran
- Occupation: Poet

Mirza Ebdilqadire Paweyi, (میرزا عەبدۆلقادری پاوەیی, Mîrza Ebdilqadirê Paweyî in Kurdish), (1850–1910), was a Kurdish poet and writer. Paweyi was born in of Paveh city in Iran.
