= Darai Rockshelter =

Archaeological site in Iran

Darai
- Marou Darai
- Kogella
- Location in Iran
- 35°09′47″N 46°22′01″E
- Type: rockshelter
- Periods: Middle Paleolithic
- Cultures: Mousterian
- Associated with: Neanderthal
- Location: Kurdistan Province, Iran
- Region: Hawraman

History
- Built: ca. 70,000 BP
- Abandoned: ca. 40,000 BP

Site notes
- Elevation: 760 m (2,490 ft)
- Excavation dates: 2016
- Archaeologists: Fereidoun Biglari
- Condition: inundated
- Owner: Ministry of Cultural Heritage, Tourism and Handicrafts, Iran

Darai Rockshelter (Persian: دارای, Kurdish:مرو دارای) is an archaeological site in the southwest of Kurdistan Province, in west Iran. It is located in the Sirwan River valley, between Naw and Asparez villages, in the Hawraman region. It faces NNW at an altitude of 760m a.s.l.The shelter was discovered during Darian Dam Archaeological Salvage Program in 2015, excavated in 2015–2016, and it was subsequently submerged in 2016.

The Darian Dam Archeological Salvage Program (DDASP) was planned by the Iranian Center for Archaeological Research before flooding the Darian Dam reservoir. This archaeological program, under the general direction of Fereidoun Biglari, has conducted several seasons of archaeological surveys and excavations within the area of the reservoir that led to the discovery of a number of important Paleolithic and more later sites.

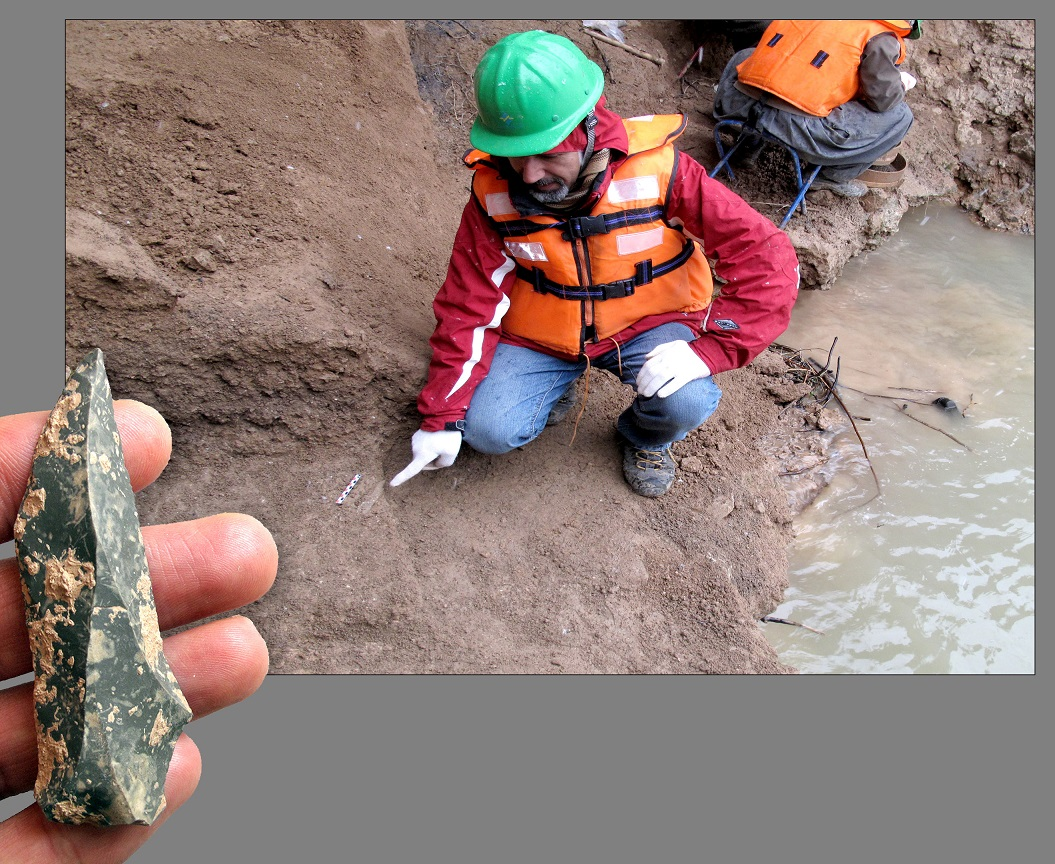
Salvage excavations at Darai Rock Shelter during the Darian Dam reservoir inundation. A team member marks the in situ position of a discovered stone tool.

== Archaeology ==
When discovered, it was partially collapsed and eroded by the Sirwan River. The site contained Middle Paleolithic archaeological deposits of about 2.30 m thick along back walls. Large-scale excavations at the site yielded two main Middle Paleolithic cultural layers. Numerous fireplaces and rich faunal and lithic assemblages were found during the excavation. The faunal assemblages are dominated by goat/sheep that show burning, cut marks, and other anthropogenic modifications. Based on the preliminary techno-typological study of the Darai lithic assemblage, the Middle Paleolithic flake-based industry of Darai generally resembles the Zagros Mousterian. The Levallois and discoid methods have been used to produce blanks for tools such as Mousterian points and side scrapers. It seems Darai was a focal point for Neanderthal habitation that resulted in the concentration of a thick accumulation of archaeological deposits in this location.
