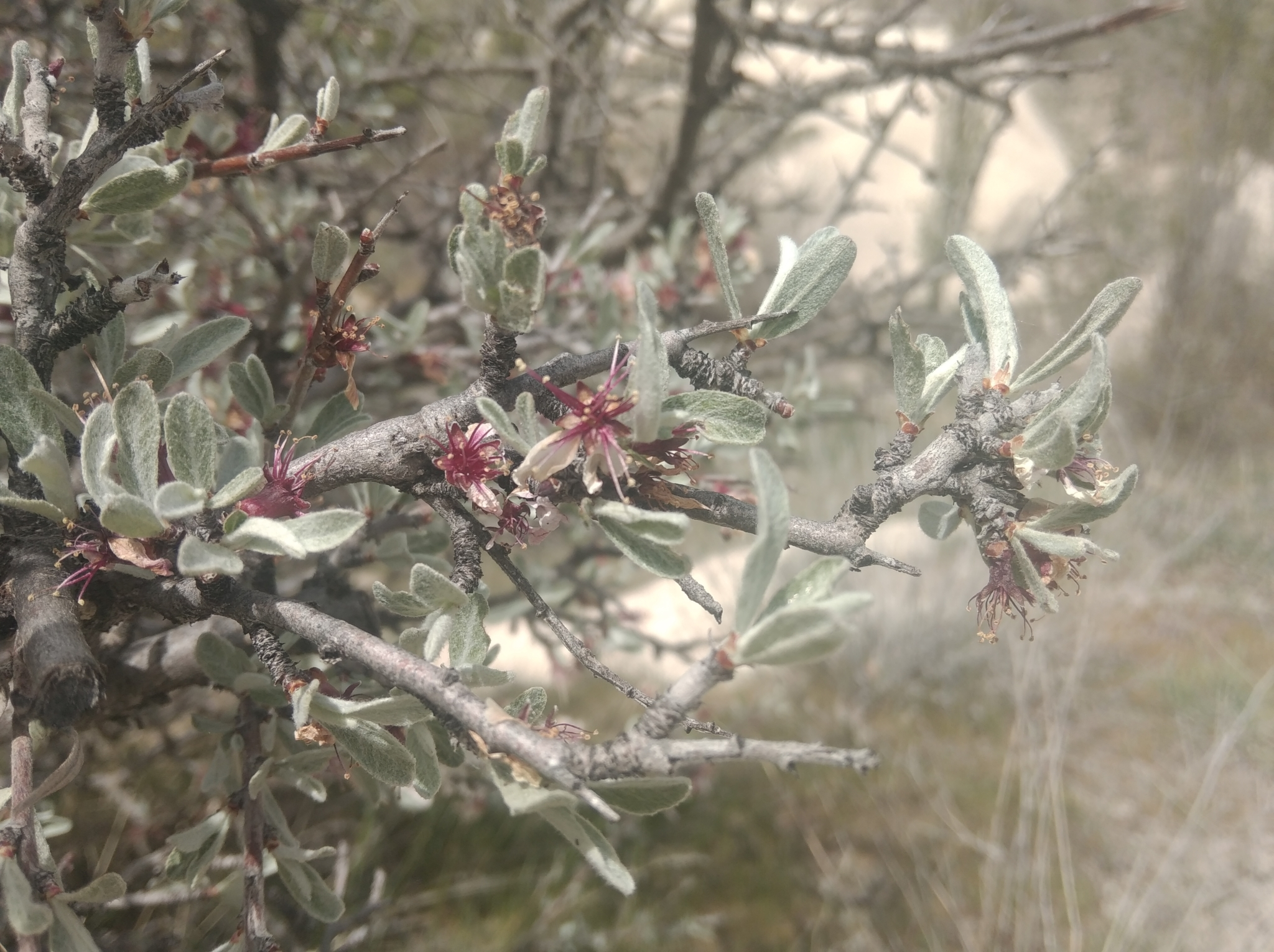

Conservation status
- Data Deficient (IUCN 3.1)

Scientific classification
- Kingdom: Plantae
- Clade: Tracheophytes
- Clade: Angiosperms
- Clade: Eudicots
- Clade: Rosids
- Order: Rosales
- Family: Rosaceae
- Genus: Prunus
- Species: P. argentea

Binomial name
- Prunus argentea (Lam.) Rehder

Synonyms
- Amygdalus argentea Lam.; Amygdalus orientalis Mill.; Amygdalus orientalis subsp. mesopotamica Browicz; Amygdalus variabilis C.K.Schneid.; Prunus orientalis (Mill.) Koehne non Prunus orientalis Walp; Amygdalus zielinski Browicz

= Prunus argentea =

Species of tree native to the Middle East

Prunus argentea, sometimes called the silver almond, is a species of wild almond found in the Levant, Turkey, Iraq and western Iran. It is a thorny shrub 0.5 to 3 m (1.6 to 9.8 ft) tall, with rough gray or brown bark. Its leaves are silvery white due to a covering of pubescent hairs. The leaves have a 1–5 mm petiole and the leaf blades are 10–44 mm (0.4–1.7 in) long and 10–23 mm (0.4–0.9 in) wide. Its inflorescences have red hypanthia and sepals, and pale pink or pink petals. The flowers are borne on a pedicel about 1 to 3 mm long, which lengthens to 2 to 7 mm when the fruit is fully developed. It is found growing in a variety of habitats; open oak woodlands, rocky slopes, dry silted areas, and steep banks of streams, at 500–2,000 m (1,600–6,600 ft) above sea level. A genetic study showed that its closest relative is probably Prunus haussknechtii.

== Uses ==
In warmer areas of Europe it is occasionally cultivated as an ornamental garden plant for its fragrant rose-pink flowers and attractive foliage, but it must be planted in a protected spot for best results.
