= Prunus carduchorum =

Scientific classification
- Kingdom: Plantae
- Clade: Tracheophytes
- Clade: Angiosperms
- Clade: Eudicots
- Clade: Rosids
- Order: Rosales
- Family: Rosaceae
- Genus: Prunus
- Subgenus: Prunus subg. Amygdalus
- Species: P. carduchorum

Binomial name
- Prunus carduchorum (Bornm.) Meikle

Synonyms
- Amygdalus carduchorum Bornm.; Amygdalus carduchorum subsp. serrata Browicz; Amygdalus carduchorum var. glabra Bornm.; Amygdalus carduchorum var. macrocarpa E.Hadac & J.Chrtek

Species of wild almond from Kurdistan

Prunus carduchorum (Persian: چغالک) is a rare species of wild almond native to Turkey, Iraq and Iran, near where the three countries meet. It is a subspinescent shrub 0.5-1.2 m tall. A native of the Eastern Anatolian montane steppe ecoregion, it prefers to grow at 1500 to 3000 m above sea level on marl slopes, in degraded oak forests. Genetically it groups with other scrubby almonds from the region. Based on morphology it was thought to yield Prunus × pabotii when crossed with Prunus haussknechtii.

== Etymology ==
The specific epithet, carduchorum, means "of the Carduchi, the wild tribesman of Kurdistan who so severely harried Xenophon and the Ten Thousand".
