= Watching brief =

Method in archaeology

In British archaeology a watching brief is a method of preserving archaeological remains by record in the face of development threat. An archaeologist is employed by the developer to monitor the excavation of foundation and service trenches, landscaping and any other intrusive work the developer undertakes to give the archaeologist sufficient time to identify and record any archaeological finds and features; however, the arrangement is rarely satisfactory for either party.

It is both intellectually and physically difficult to identify archaeological features in narrow foundation trenches and the potential delay to a project can also be difficult for a developer to incorporate into a development programme. Prior evaluation through trial trenching can overcome these problems by having the archaeology examined and removed or preserved before groundworks commence.

Defined by the Chartered Institute for Archaeologists (CIfA) as: “…a formal programme of observation and investigation conducted during any operation carried out for non-archaeological reasons. This will be within a specified area or site on land, inter-tidal zone or underwater, where there is a possibility that archaeological deposits may be disturbed or destroyed. The programme will result in the preparation of a report and ordered archive.” (IFA rev.1999) The purpose of an Archaeological Watching Brief is similarly defined by the CIfA and is: “to allow, within the resources available, the preservation by record of archaeological deposits, their presence and nature of which could not be established (or established with sufficient accuracy) in advance of development or other potentially disruptive works.”

== See also ==
- Archaeological field survey
- Shovel test pit
- Trial trenching
- Excavation
