= Inscription of Sargon II at Tang-i Var =

Kurdish historical inscription

The Inscription of Sargon II at Tang-i Var is carved on the flanks of the Zinanah Mt. in the Tang-i Var pass in Hawraman, Iranian Kurdistan, about 50 km southwest of Sanandaj. It was discovered during an archaeological survey carried out by Sardaraz in 1968.

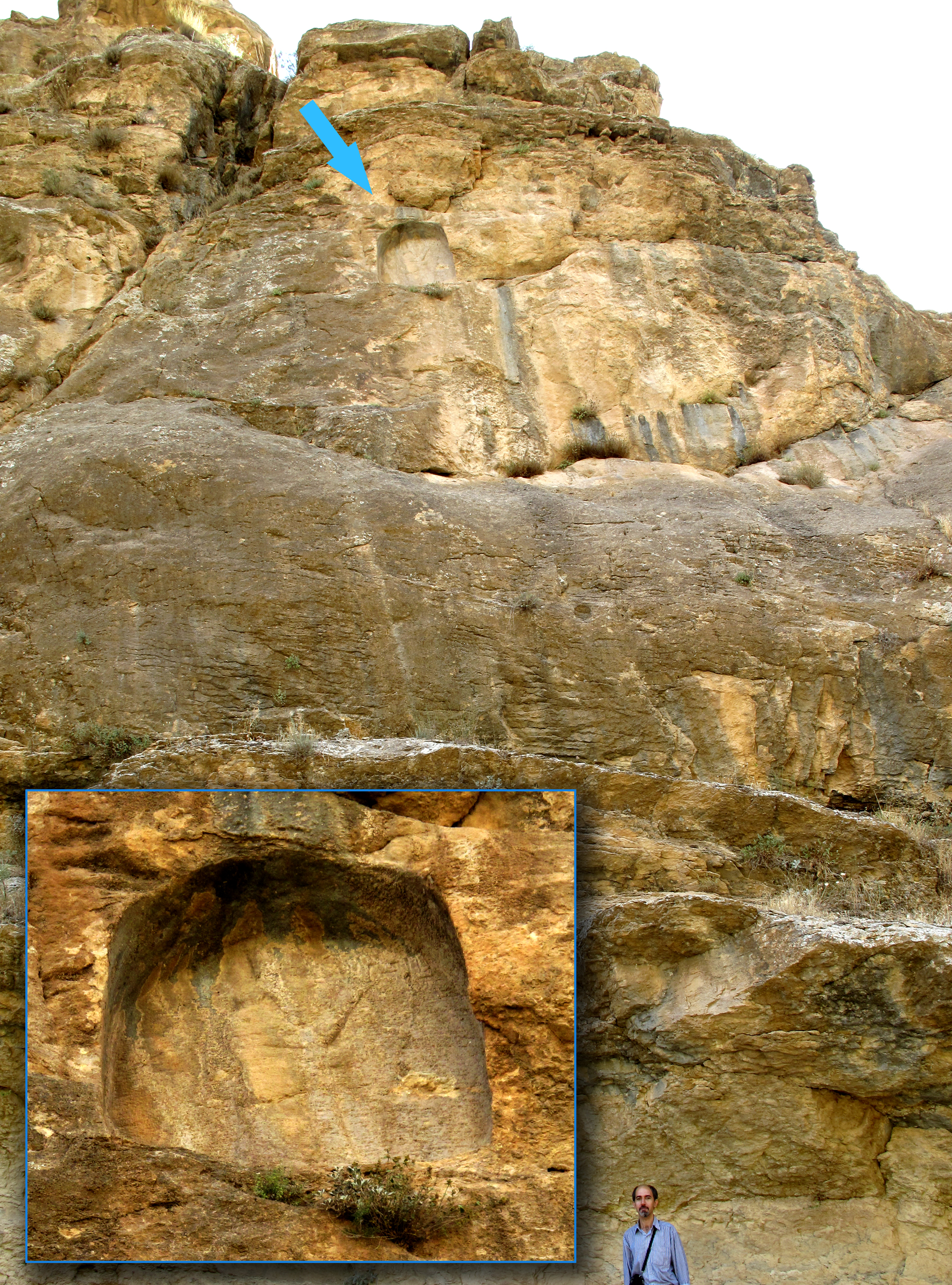
Tang-i Var 2012

It is located in a niche cut into the cliff face about 40 m above the valley floor and depicts an Assyrian ruler in a standard pose. A badly worn cuneiform inscription runs across the relief. The inscription records a campaign to the land of Karalla (lines 37 44) and also refers to Sargon's defeat of the Babylonian ruler Marduk-apla iddina 11 (Merodach -Baladan) which occurred in 710 -709. Since the Assyrian Chronicle mentions Karalla in its entry for 706, it is likely that there was a campaign to Karalla in that year, and that the relief and inscription of Sargon at Tang-i Var were made during or shortly after that campaign. This is the only known account of the campaign in Sargon's sixteenth year, a campaign that was not led by the Assyrian king.

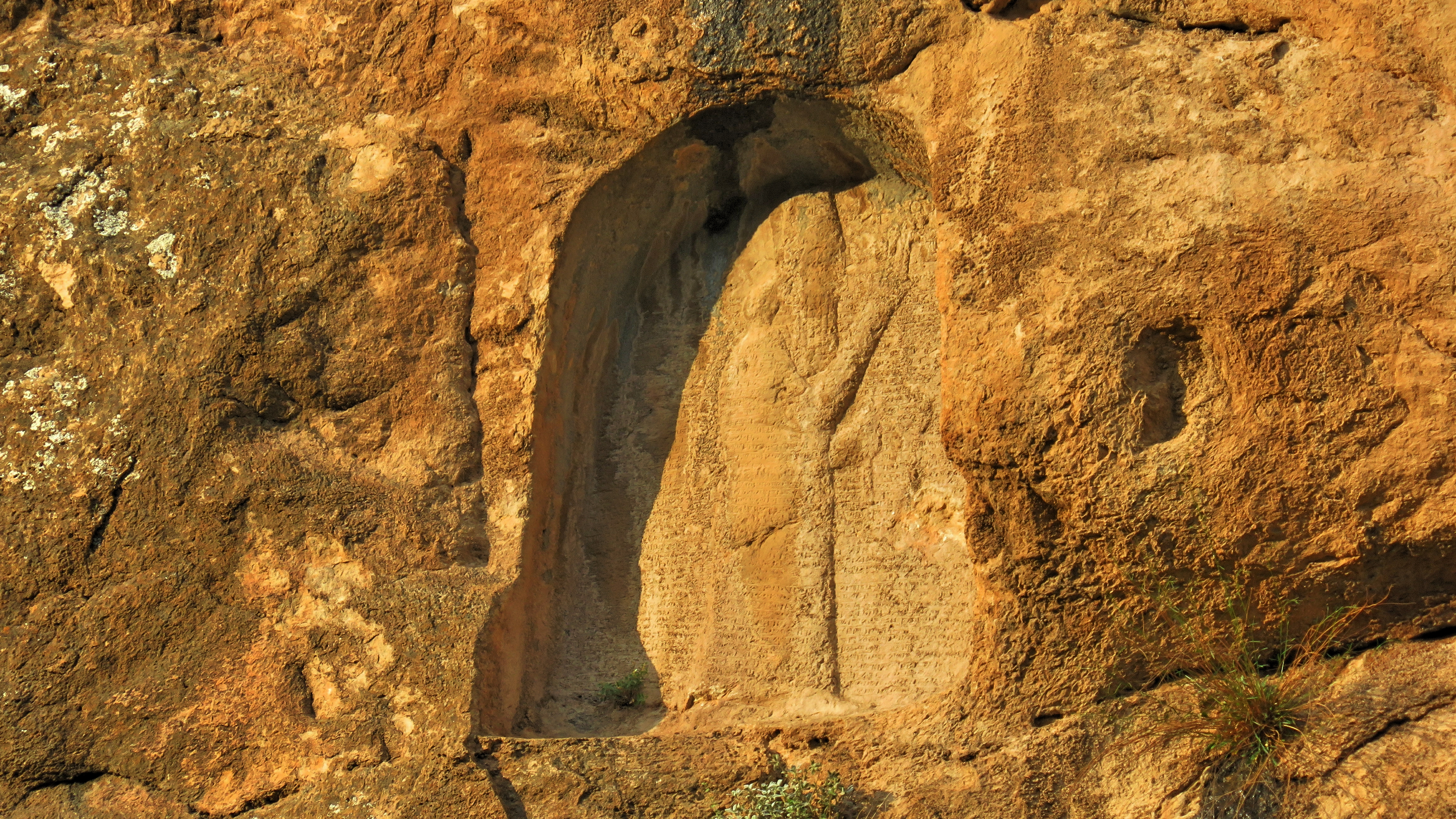
The Inscription of Sargon II at Tang-i Var
