= Sa'eed Kurdistani =

Kurdish Iranian physician, Protestant convert and evangelist

Dr. Saeed Khan Kurdistani (1863–1942), also known as Dr. Sa'eed of Iran or Said Khan Kurdistani, was a Kurdish Iranian physician, Protestant Christian convert and evangelist. He is regarded as one of the most important indigenous Protestant Christian leaders in the history of Iranian Kurdistan.

== Early life ==
Saeed was born into a Muslim Kurdish family in Sanandaj, western Iran in 1863. He followed his father into being a mullah but he converted to Protestant Christianity through contact with an evangelist called Kasha Yohanan. He subsequently devoted his life to medical practice and Christian ministry among Kurdish and Persian communities.

== Ministry ==
Saeed became one of the best-known indigenous Protestant leaders associated with the American Presbyterian mission in Iran. He was deeply influenced by the Plymouth Brethren in London, whom he found to be the most healthy expression of Christianity he encountered.
Alongside his medical practice he preached Christianity, translated and distributed Christian literature, and travelled extensively among Kurdish communities. His ministry brought him into contact with tribal leaders, government officials and missionaries working throughout western Iran.

In his study of Christianity among the Kurds, Robert Blincoe identifies Saeed as one of the principal indigenous figures in the emergence of a Kurdish Protestant witness during the twentieth century.

== Medical Practice ==
Saeed became a leading physician in Persia in no small part because of two years spent training in London (1893–95). He attended Cook's School of Anatomy and Physiology; he studied ophthalmology at the General Hospital, Croydon and the Central Hospital; and was an early student of Dr Patrick Manson, later founder of the London School of Tropical Medicine, whose instruction was of immense value in his practice in Persia. He treated people of all classes and various ethnic groups in Persia, including many prominent people such as Prince Eyn-ed-Dowleh. His biographers summarised this breadth in his outreach thus in the subtitle of their book: 'Kurdish Physician to Princes and Peasants, Nobles and Nomads'.

== Legacy ==
His pioneering medical practice was the subject of an article in an Iranian journal of the history of medicine in 2015. Isaac Malek Yonan published the first full biography of Saeed in 1934, describing his conversion, medical career and evangelistic work. A more extensive biography by Jay M. Rasooli and Cady Hews Allen appeared in 1957.

Presbyterian missionary William McElwee Miller devoted the first three chapters of Ten Muslims Meet Christ to the stories of Dr Saeed and his brother Kaka.

The historian Marcin Rzepka argues that Said Kurdistani was "one of the most important persons in the history of Christianity in Kurdistan in the twentieth century", noting that his life illustrates the emergence of an indigenous Kurdish expression of Christianity distinct from foreign missionary control.
