= Pir Shalyar =

Festival in Kurdistan

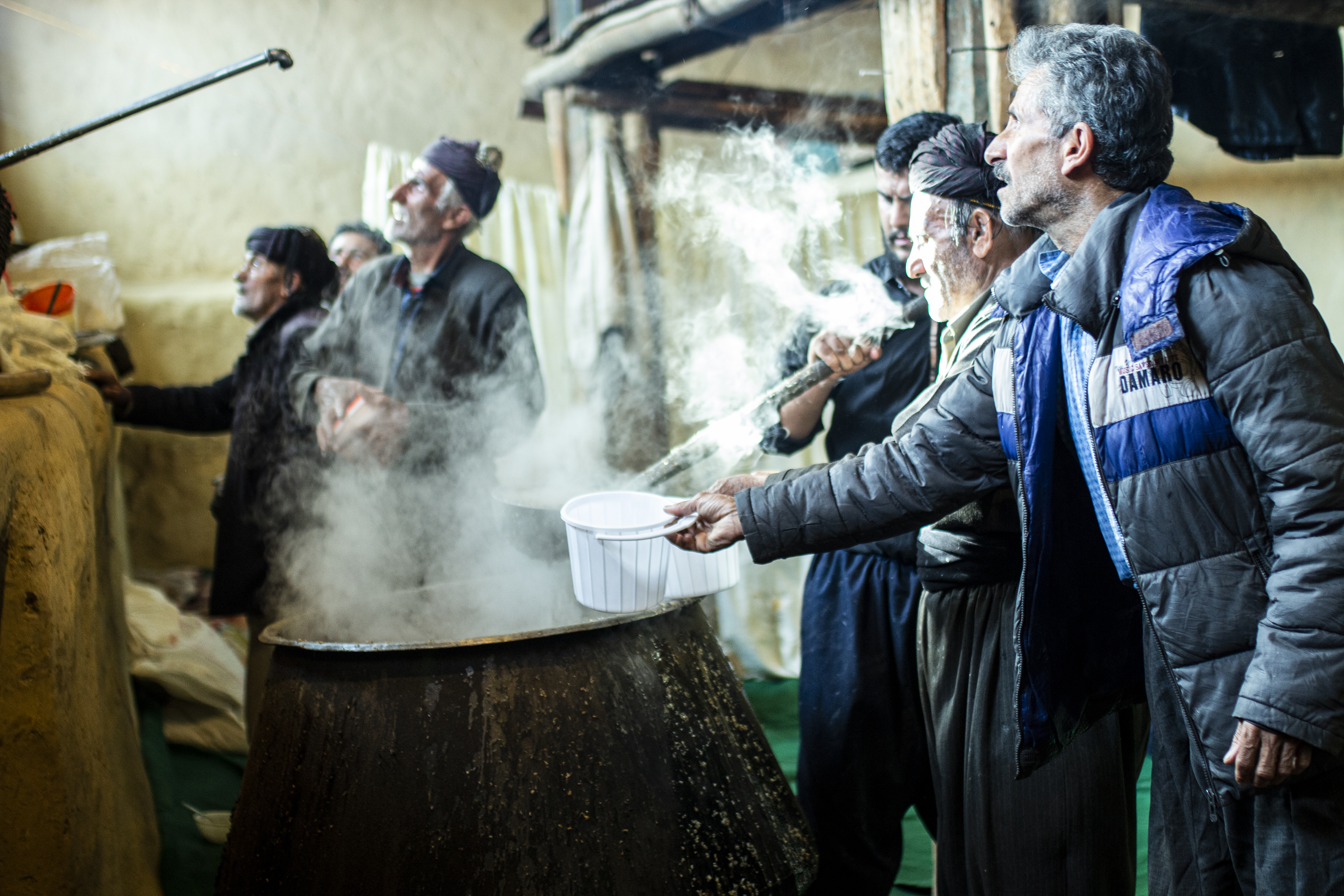
Preparation for Pir Shalyar

The festival of Pir Shalyar (Kurdish: زەماوەندی پیر شالیار) (also spelled as Shaliyar) is an old traditional ceremony in Kurdistan. It is held in the 40th day of winter. The celebration is held in three stages, each in a day of three consecutive weeks.

== Pir Shalyar ==
Pir (saint/magi) Shalyar (vizier), (Kurdish: زەماوەندی پیر شالیار i.e. Pir Shaliyar is believed to have cured a Bukharan princess and married her; the ceremony marks their marriage. It's also believed to be the 'oldest' literary text in Kurdish before the Islamization of Kurdistan.

The word "Pir Shalyar" consists of three parts, each of them has different meaning. "Pir" from the point of view of Mithraism is said to someone who has passed the seven stages of this creed. "Sha" is told whose have magnitude and greatness that could catch people's attention. "Liyar" is the third part of the word and means mate, deputy and agent. Actually, "Pir Shalyar" has been an historical myth that was living hundreds of years ago under the name of king of kings or master of masters.

Pir Shalyar from the laymen perspective:

From the laymen perspective, Pir Shalyar is the second name of Seyyed Mostafa who has changed the sacred book of the first Pir Shalyar under the name of "epistemology of Pir Shalyar" and has written about Islamic doctrine, moreover he changed her name to Mostafa, the son of God.

As written in historical books, the first Pir Shalyar is Siaw the son of Jamasb was living 150 years before BC. He has been a Zoroastrian follower and the writer of the book "Epistemology of Pir Shalyar".

The second Pir Shalyar is Seyyed Mostafa Khodadadi, who was living in the age of Sheikh Abdul Qadir Gilani in the year 561 AH and has been totally familiar with thoughts an idea of first Pir Shalyar. Seyyed Mostafa has changed the Zoroastrian creed in the book and added the Islamic teaching instead.

== Celebration ==
In the first week children inform the people of the coming of the ceremony with distribution of walnuts to every home.

In the second week, at the Wednesday night before sunrise, children go up to the roofs of homes, singing the traditional Kurdish songs. Shortly after sunrise cows and sheep are sacrificed. In the evening they play Daf and pray repeating spiritual hymns.

In the third Friday of the month Rebendan (second month of winter in Kurdish calendar), golden breads made of wheat and walnut in the shape of the sun (disc) are brought to the tomb of Pir to be distributed among participants and eaten.
