= Shovel test pit =

Standard method for archaeological surveys

A shovel test pit (STP) is a standard method for archaeological survey. It is usually a part of the Cultural Resources Management (CRM) methodology and a popular form of rapid archaeological survey in the United States of America and Canada.

It designates a series of (c. 0.50 m or less) test holes, usually dug out by a shovel (hence the name) in order to determine whether the soil contains any cultural remains that are not visible on the surface. The soil is sifted or screened through 1/4" or 6 mm wire mesh to recover the artifacts.

STPs will often be laid out over the project area in a grid-like fashion or in a consistently spaced line, creating a fairly systematic survey. Therefore, after the holes have been dug, one may map artifact densities over the project area, pinpointing the locations of possible sites where further investigation may be necessary. The interval at which the STPs are placed varies considerably and, in CRM at least, is sometimes prescribed by state regulations (in the U.S.) or is determined by the conditions in the field. The usual space between two STPs is 10 m or more but it can be considerably less (e.g., 1 m). The current standards in the United States is 30m or less. The depth of an STP depends on the depth at which either the bedrock or the sterile subsoil is found.

The form of STP may vary from region to region and even within regions by company/organization. Common forms include circular and square shaped. Circular STP often have cylindrical to "bullet" (i.e., cylinder with short inverted conical base) shaped profiles and range from 30 cm to 50 cm diameter. Square STPs are typically about 50 cm, but some locations prefer other sizes (e.g., 40 cm). Unusual and unusually ineffective variants include circular (30 to 50 cm diameter) STP with truncated conical profiles.

Depth of STP excavation also varies widely and is often dependent upon local soil types and expected maximum depth of sites. Typically this ranges from 30 cm to 1.0 m. A second factor is mechanical, in that excavation is limited by the tools and techniques used (i.e., shovel versus trowel). Typically STP are excavated to a maximum average of 1.0 m, although it is possible to excavate somewhat deeper (1.25 to 1.5 m) dependent upon the excavator and the tools available. STP can be combined with other techniques and tools (augers, corers) to extend the maximum depth of effective testing beyond 1.5 m.

== See also ==
- Archaeological excavation
- Trial trenching
- Watching brief
