= Trial trenching =

Method of archaeological evaluation

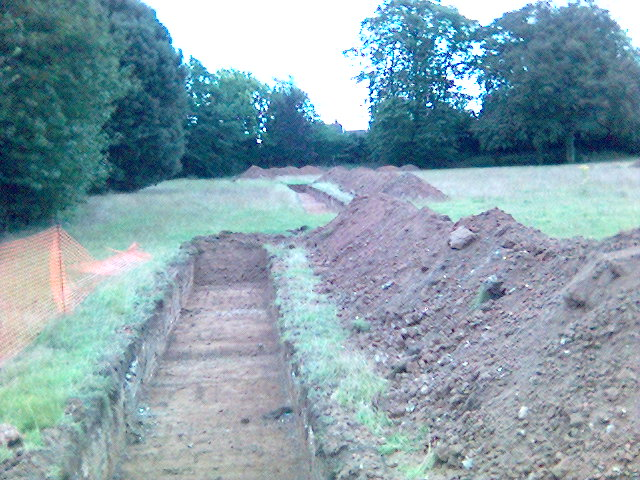
Archaeological trial trenches

Trial trenching is a rapid and relatively inexpensive method of archaeological evaluation used to estimate the archaeological potential of a site.

== Method ==
Trenches are dug at regular intervals across a site, leaving the rest untouched. A mechanical excavator is used to dig down to archaeological features or natural geological deposits, and any material suitable for archaeological study is recorded. No further excavation takes place at this stage. The results of the trial trenching are used to inform any future stage of work which may extend to full excavation of the rest of the site, if the evaluation reveals significant finds.

In the UK, the results of trial trenchings are used to inform a decision on the need for any further archaeological work to be undertaken prior to development. This process is enshrined in the National Planning Policy Framework (NPPF).

=== Sampling strategy ===
There is some argument over the sampling strategy to be employed in trial trenching, especially in evaluating sites that are intended for development. Issues such as the effectiveness of certain trench layouts or the percentage of the site to be dug (normally around 5% at present) are widely discussed. Whether an effective picture of past human activity on a site can be truly estimated through this methods is widely debated. Development can destroy buried archaeology forever and a reliable evaluation methodology is very important. Whilst it is difficult to quantify the number of false negative results there have certainly been examples of evaluations suggesting a relatively limited amount of past activity which has had to be upwardly revised during the excavation.

== See also ==
- Archaeological field survey
- Excavation
- Shovel test pit
- Watching brief
- wikt:sondage
