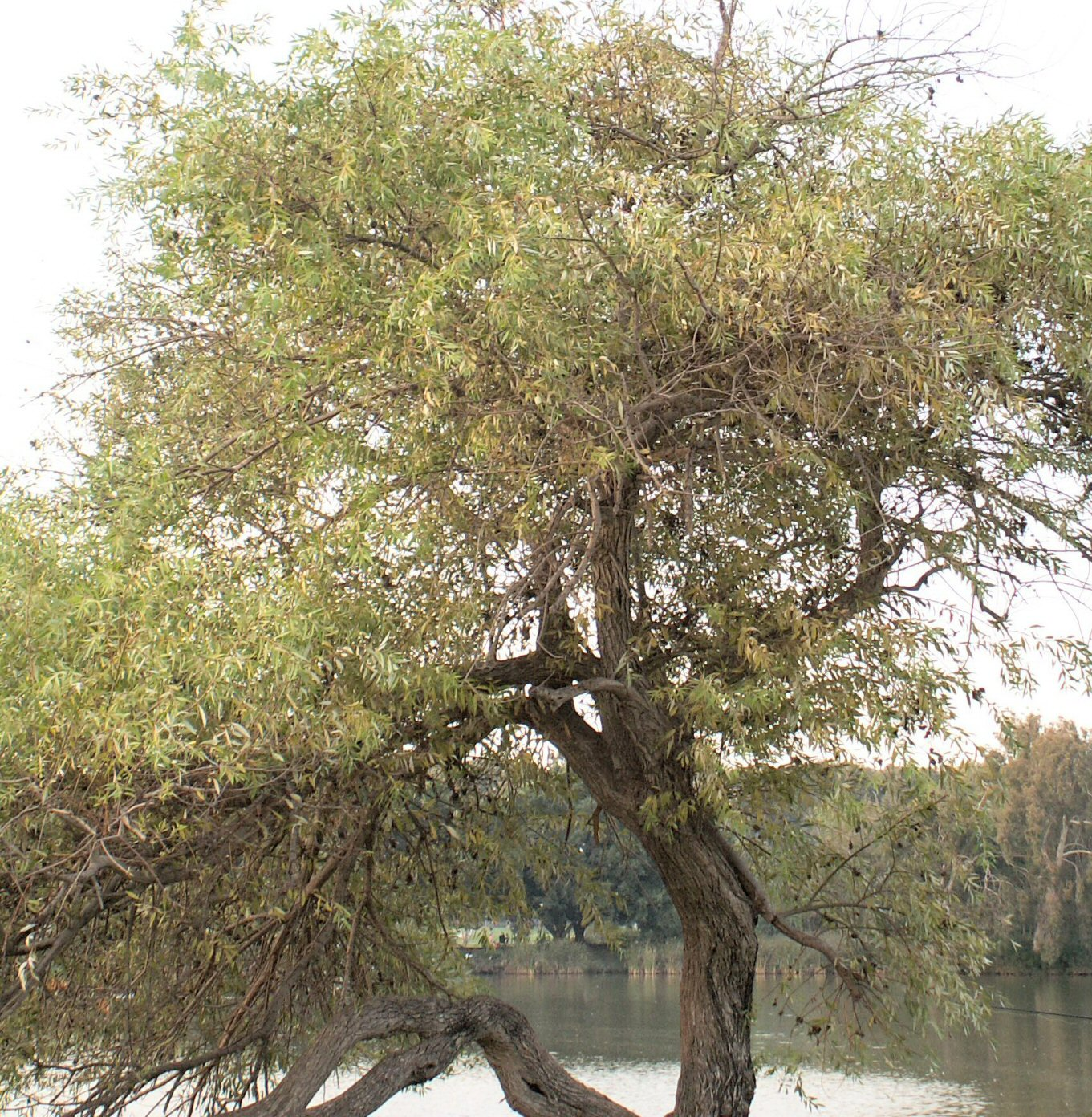

Conservation status
- Least Concern (IUCN 3.1)

Scientific classification
- Kingdom: Plantae
- Clade: Embryophytes
- Clade: Tracheophytes
- Clade: Spermatophytes
- Clade: Angiosperms
- Clade: Eudicots
- Clade: Rosids
- Order: Malpighiales
- Family: Salicaceae
- Genus: Salix
- Species: S. acmophylla

Binomial name
- Salix acmophylla Boiss.

Synonyms
- Pleiarina dealbata (Andersson) N.Chao & G.T.Gong; Salix daviesii Boiss. Salix dealbata Andersson; Salix dinsmorei Enander ex Dinsm. Salix glaucophylla Andersson; Salix louisii A.Camus & Gomb. Salix persica Boiss. Salix pseudosafsaf A.Camus, Gomb. & Guillaumin

= Salix acmophylla =

Species of flowering plant

Salix acmophylla, also known as brook willow, is a willow native to central Asia, the Middle East and Egypt.
