= Bil spring =

Natural spring in Avroman, Iran

Coordinates: 35°10′05″N 46°21′00″E

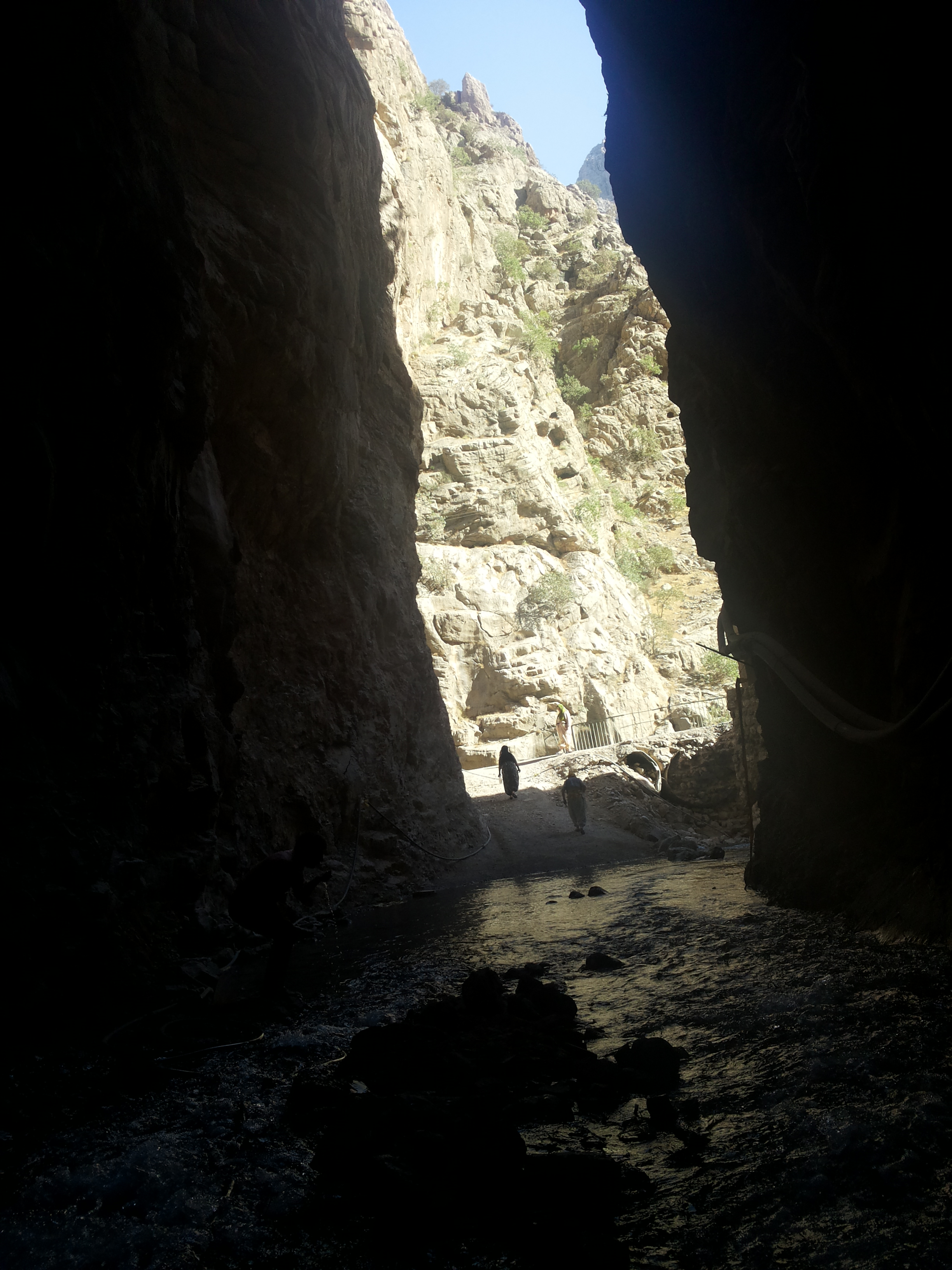
Entrance of hāna-w Beli

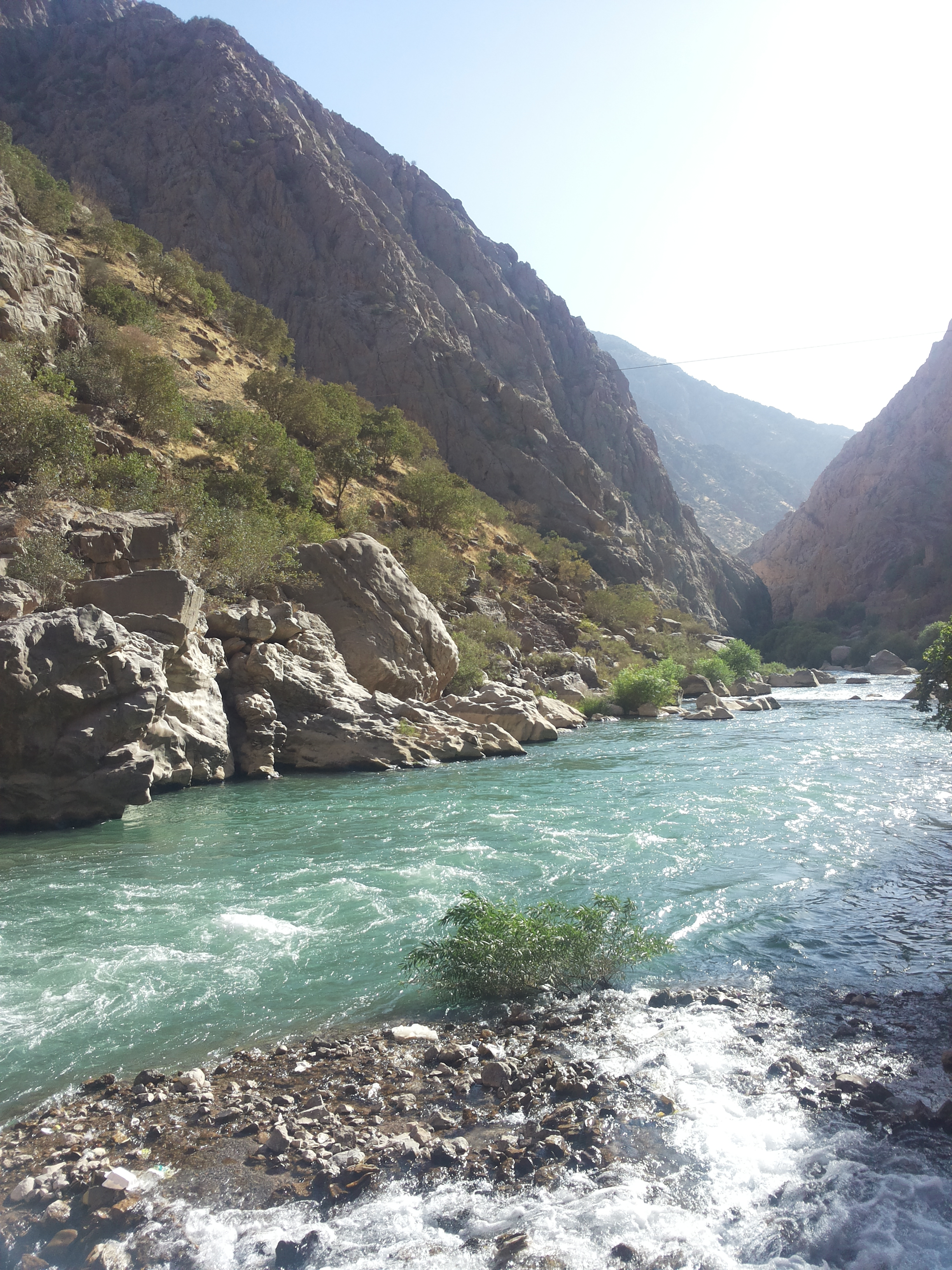
Intersection of hāna-w Beli and Sirwan River

Bil Spring (Persian: چشمه بل; Kurdish: کانی بڵ, Kaniya Bil, Kanî Bill; Gurani: کانی بڵ, romanized: Hāna-w Beli) is a natural spring in the Hewraman region in Iran. Bil Spring is the biggest spring in western parts of Iran. It is of very significant cultural value to the Hewrami people and there are many references to it in their culture, identity and Literature. However, it is in danger of annihilation because of construction of the "Daryan" dam nearby. The river that is formed by this fountain is 15m long, making it the shortest river in the world.
