= Hajij-e Bozorg =

Hajij-e Bozorg حجيج بزرگ
- Village
- Location within Iran
- Coordinates: 35°09′51″N 46°20′02″E
- Country: Iran
- Province: Kermanshah
- County: Paveh
- Bakhsh: Nowsud
- Rural District: Sirvan

Population (2006)
  - Total: 603
- Time zone: UTC+3:30 (IRST)
  - Summer (DST): UTC+4:30 (IRDT)

Hajij-e Bozorg (Persian: حجيج بزرگ, also Romanized as Hajīj-e Bozorg; also known as Ḩajīj) is a village in Sirvan Rural District, Nowsud District, Paveh County, Kermanshah Province, Iran. At the 2006 census, its population was 603, in 163 families.

The village is in a district called "Hawraman" which lies through the mountains of Shaho. The language spoken by the native people is a variant of Kurdish called Hewrami. The tomb of Kose Hajij is located in the village. There is a large spring about 2 kilometers away from the village called Kani Bil or Bil spring which is the largest Karst spring in the region.

The earliest archaeological records show that the Hajij vicinity was inhabited by humans since Middle Paleolithic Period. This evidence was discovered by archaeologists near the village and include stone tools that were probably made by Neanderthals. .

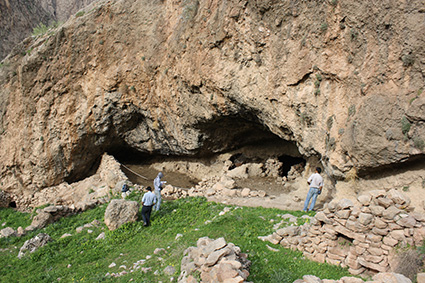
A cave site near Hajij village, where archaeologists discovered stone tools dating back to more than 40 thousand years ago in 2015
