= Javanrud =

City in Kermanshah province, Iran

Javanrud Persian: جوانرود Kurdish: جوانڕۆ
- City
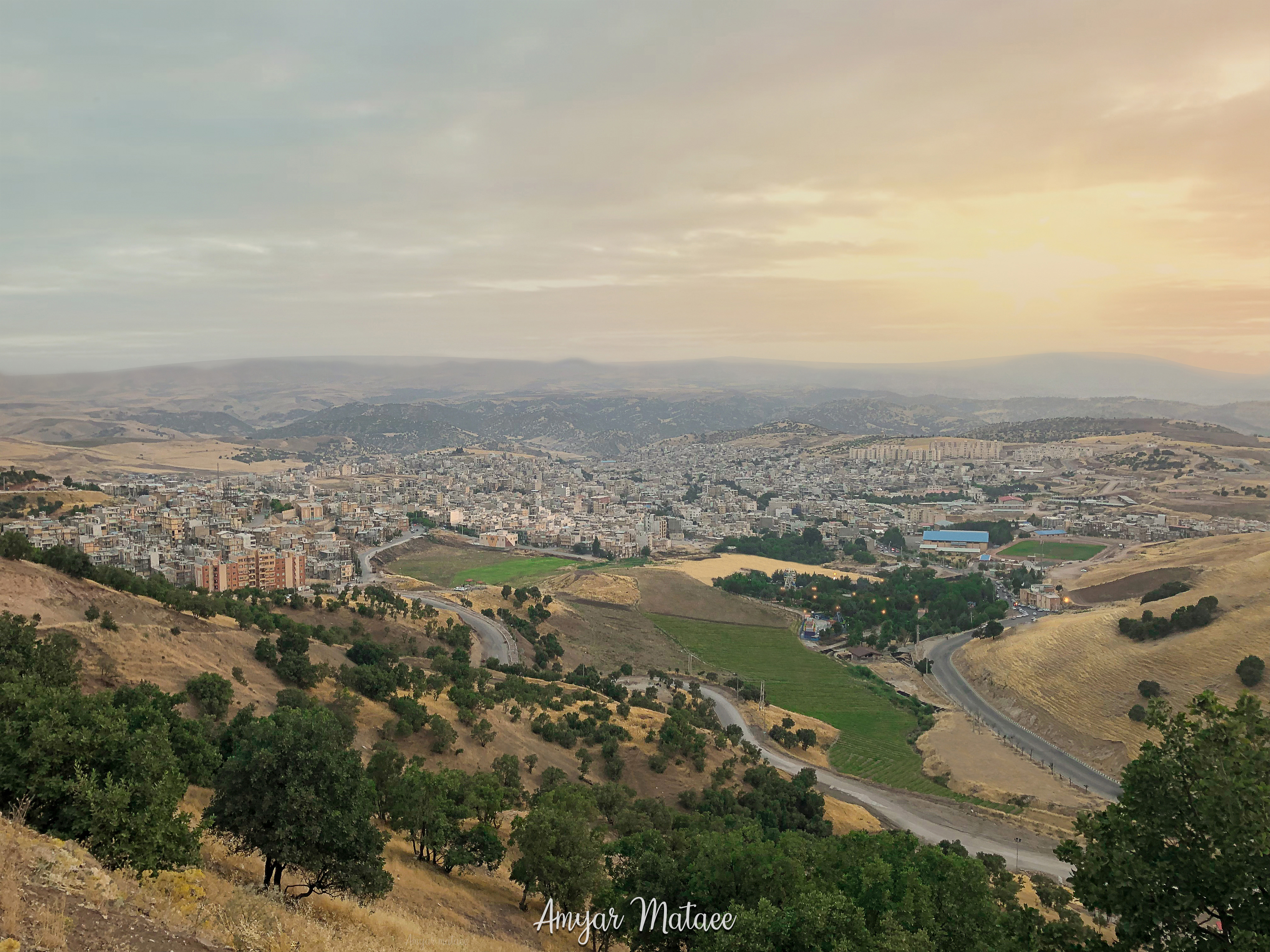
- Landscape near Javanrud

- Location within Iran
- Coordinates: 34°48′28″N 46°29′38″E
- Country: Iran
- Province: Kermanshah
- County: Javanrud
- District: Central

Population (2016)
  - Total: 54,354
- Time zone: UTC+3:30 (IRST)

Javanrud (Persian: جوانرود) (Note: Also romanized as Javānrūd; also known as Qal‘a Jūanrūd, Qal‘eh Jūānrūd, and Qal‘eh-ye Javānrūd (English: Fort Javanrud); also Ciwanro and Jūānrū (Kurdish: جوانڕۆ, romanized: Ciwanro)) is a city in the Central District of Javanrud County, Kermanshah province, Iran, serving as capital of both the county and the district. The city is 79 kilometers north of Kermanshah and is 1,300 meters above sea level.

== Etymology ==
The name of the city is derived from the Kurdish Javanrud tribe, which had formerly dominated the area, and which has now become almost fully urban.

== History ==
During its early history, Javanrud was part of the loosely defined Ardalan province, the previous name of the present-day Kurdistan province. In 1909, its vali (governor) Aman-Allah Khan Ardalan (r. 1799–1825) ordered the construction of a fortress named Qal'a-ye Javanrud on a small hill near the middle of the Javanrud. In the mid-1970s, Javanrud was added to the Kermanshah province, later receiving its own sub-province in 1989.

== Demographics ==
=== Language, ethnicity, and religion ===
The city is populated by Kurds, from various tribal backgrounds, who adhere to Sunni Islam. However, the Jaff tribe is the main tribe in the city. The two Sufi branches Naqshbandi and Qadiriyya have a strong presence in the city as well. The locals speak Gorani, Sorani and Persian.

=== Population ===
At the time of the 2006 National Census, the city's population was 43,104 in 9,591 households. The following census in 2011 counted 51,483 people in 13,043 households. The 2016 census measured the population of the city as 54,354 people in 15,010 households.

== See also ==
- Ravansar
- Paveh
