= Prunus webbii =

Scientific classification
- Kingdom: Plantae
- Clade: Tracheophytes
- Clade: Angiosperms
- Clade: Eudicots
- Clade: Rosids
- Order: Rosales
- Family: Rosaceae
- Genus: Prunus
- Subgenus: Prunus subg. Prunus
- Species: P. webbii

Binomial name
- Prunus webbii (Spach) Fritsch

Synonyms
- Amygdalus webbii Spach; Amygdalus salicifolia Boiss. & Balansa; Amygdalus webbii var. salicifolia (Boiss. & Bal.) Boiss.

Species of plant

Prunus webbii is a species of Prunus found growing around the Mediterranean Sea, from the Iberian peninsula through Sicily, Greece, Crete and the Aegean Islands, the Balkans and Anatolia, and possibly as far as Iraq or Iran. It is also found in certain areas of Northern Africa. A dense spiny shrub or small tree with extremely bitter seeds, it is thought to have contributed with some genes to the domesticated almond Prunus dulcis, although the extent of the contribution is debated and not yet fully understood.
