= Fereidoun Biglari =

Iranian archaeologist (b. 1970)

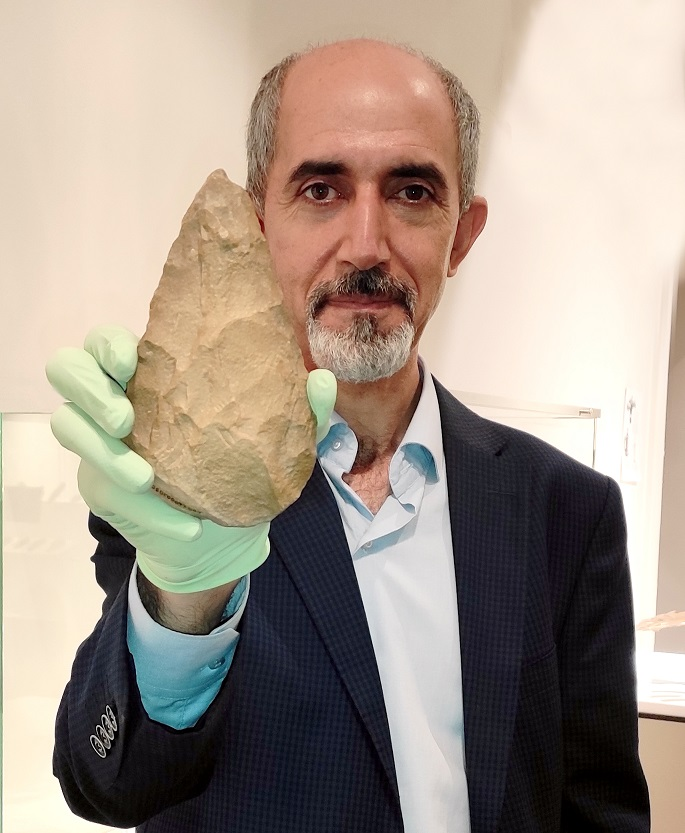
- Born: 9 March 1970; Qasr-e Shirin, Kermanshah province, Imperial State of Iran
- Occupations: Head of the Paleolithic Department, and Deputy for Cultural Affairs
- Employer: National Museum of Iran

Fereidoun Biglari (Persian: فریدون بیگلری; Kurdish: فەرەیدوون بیگلێری; born 9 March 1970) is an Iranian archaeologist and a museum curator.

== Career ==
Fereidoun Biglari is co-founder and head of the Paleolithic department in National Museum of Iran which was established in 2001. He is serving as a member of the research council of the Iranian Center for Archaeological Research (ICAR). He is also editor-in-chief of "Journal of Iranian Archaeology" since its establishment in 2010. The journal is a scholarly journal about ancient Iran and neighboring regions. Since 1993, he has been directing archaeological field projects in various parts of Iran. His field of research covers Lower Paleolithic of Iran and western Asia and Middle Paleolithic of Iran in general and Zagros region (Iran and Iraq) in particular.

He is co-director of a joint archaeological project in collaboration with the laboratory "PACEA" Prehistory and Quaternary Geology Institute (CNRS-University of Bordeaux 1), Bordeaux, France in the Central Zagros and Isfahan regions. He was awarded a doctoral fellowship in 2007, and currently is a PhD candidate at University of Bordeaux 1. He established the Zagros Paleolithic Museum in Kermanshah in collaboration with Kermanshah provincial office of the Iranian Cultural Heritage Organization in 2008. This museum is the first established museum in Iran devoted to the Paleolithic period of Iran.

He has been continuously involved in the research, surveys, and excavations of Paleolithic sites in Iran which resulted in many discoveries in both Zagros and the Iranian Central Plateau. His most recent project was Darian Dam Archaeological Salvage Program, planned by the Iranian Center for Archaeological Research before flooding the Darian Dam reservoir in the Hawrāmān region of Kurdistan and Kermanshah, Iran. Under his direction, four teams excavated 16 archaeological sites, of which four date back to Middle Paleolithic, Upper Paleolithic, and Epipaleolithic periods.

He is active in presenting paleolithic archaeology to the public through different media such as newspapers, magazines, exhibitions, Instagram, and TV Telecast.

== Selected publications ==
=== Books ===
- Otte, M., F. Biglari, and J. Jaubert (eds), 2009, Iran Palaeolithic, Proceedings of the XV World Congress UISPP, Lisbonne, Vol. 28, BAR International Series 1968.
- Biglari, Fereidoun and Kamyar Abdi (eds), 2014, Evidence for Two Hundred Thousand Years of Human-Animal Bond in the Land of Iran, edited by Published in conjunction with the exhibition "Evidence for Two Hundred Thousand Years of Human-Animal Bond in the Land of Iran", National Museum of Iran, August–September, Tehran
- Biglari, Fereidoun, Jebrael Nokandeh, Abdolmajid Naderi Beni and Ali Hozhabri (eds), 2020, Human and the Sea: A Review of Thousands of Years of Relationship between Humans and the Sea in Iran, National Museum of Iran and Ports and Maritime Organization of Iran, Tehran

=== Articles ===
- Trinkaus, E and F. Biglari, 2006, Middle Paleolithic Human Remains from Bisitun Cave, Iran, Paléorient: 32.2: 105-1
- Biglari, F. and Shidrang, S., 2006, The Lower Paleolithic Occupation of Iran, Near Eastern Archaeology 69(3–4): 160-168
- Biglari, F., 2007, The Lower and Middle Paleolithic Occupations of Iran: A Brief Review, In Iran, Fragments from Paradise, pp. 31–39, Instituto Nacional de Antropologia e Historia, Mexico City
- Otte, M., F. Biglari, D. Flas, S. Shidrang, N. Zwyns, M. Mashkour, R. Naderi, A. Mohaseb N. Hashemi, J. Darvish, & V. Radu, 2007, The Aurignacian in the Zagros region: new research at Yafteh Cave, Lorestan, Iran, Antiquity 81:82-96
- Biglari F, M. Javeri, M. Mashkour, Y. Yazdi, S. Shidrang, M. Tengberg, and K. Taheri and J. Darvish, 2009, Test excavations at the Middle Paleolithic sites of Qaleh Bozi, Southwest of Central Iran, A preliminary report, In: M. Otte, F. Biglari, and J. Jaubert (eds), Iran Palaeolithic. pp. 29–38, Proceedings of the XV World Congress UISPP, Lisbonne, Vol. 28, BAR International Series 1968.
- Biglari, F. and V. Jahani, 2011, The Pleistocene Human Settlement in Gilan, Southwest Caspian Sea: Recent Research, Eurasian Prehistory, 8 (1–2): 3–28.
- Biglari, F. 2012, The Development of the Paleolithic Archaeology in Iran; a Review, in Eighty years of Iranian Archaeology, Edited by Yousef Hassanzadeh, pp. 7–48, Pazineh Publication, National Museum of Iran and Iranian Center for Archaeological Research, Tehran
- Biglari, F., and S. Shidrang 2016, New Evidence of Paleolithic Occupation in the Western Zagros foothills, in The Archaeology of the Kurdistan Region of Iraq and Adjacent Regions, Edited by Konstantinos Kopanias and John MacGinnis, pp. 29–38, Archaeopress.
- Biglari, F and S. Shidrang 2019, Rescuing the Paleolithic Heritage of Hawraman, Kurdistan, Iranian Zagros, Near Eastern Archaeology 82 (4): 226-235.https://doi.org/10.1086/706536.
- Zanolli, Clément, Fereidoun Biglari, Marjan Mashkour, Kamyar Abdi, Herve Monchot, Karyne Debue, Arnaud Mazurier, Priscilla Bayle, Mona Le Luyer, Hélène Rougier, Erik Trinkaus, Roberto Macchiarelli. 2019, Neanderthal from the Central Western Zagros, Iran. Structural reassessment of the Wezmeh 1 maxillary premolar. Journal of Human Evolution, Vol: 135.
