= Prunus haussknechtii =

Scientific classification
- Kingdom: Plantae
- Clade: Tracheophytes
- Clade: Angiosperms
- Clade: Eudicots
- Clade: Rosids
- Order: Rosales
- Family: Rosaceae
- Genus: Prunus
- Species: P. haussknechtii

Binomial name
- Prunus haussknechtii C.K.Schneid.

Synonyms
- Amygdalus haussknechtii (C.K.Schneid.) Bornm.

Species of wild almond from Iran

Prunus haussknechtii (Persian: ارجنک) is a species of wild almond native to Iran. It is shrub or small tree 1–2 m tall, sometimes reaching 4 m, with pink flowers. It prefers to grow at 1200 to 3600 m above sea level, near water, either riverbanks or mountain bases where there is melting snow. It has the largest nut and seed of the 17 species of almond.
