= Feyli Kurds =

Kurdish tribe in Iraq and Iran

کوردەیل فەیلی
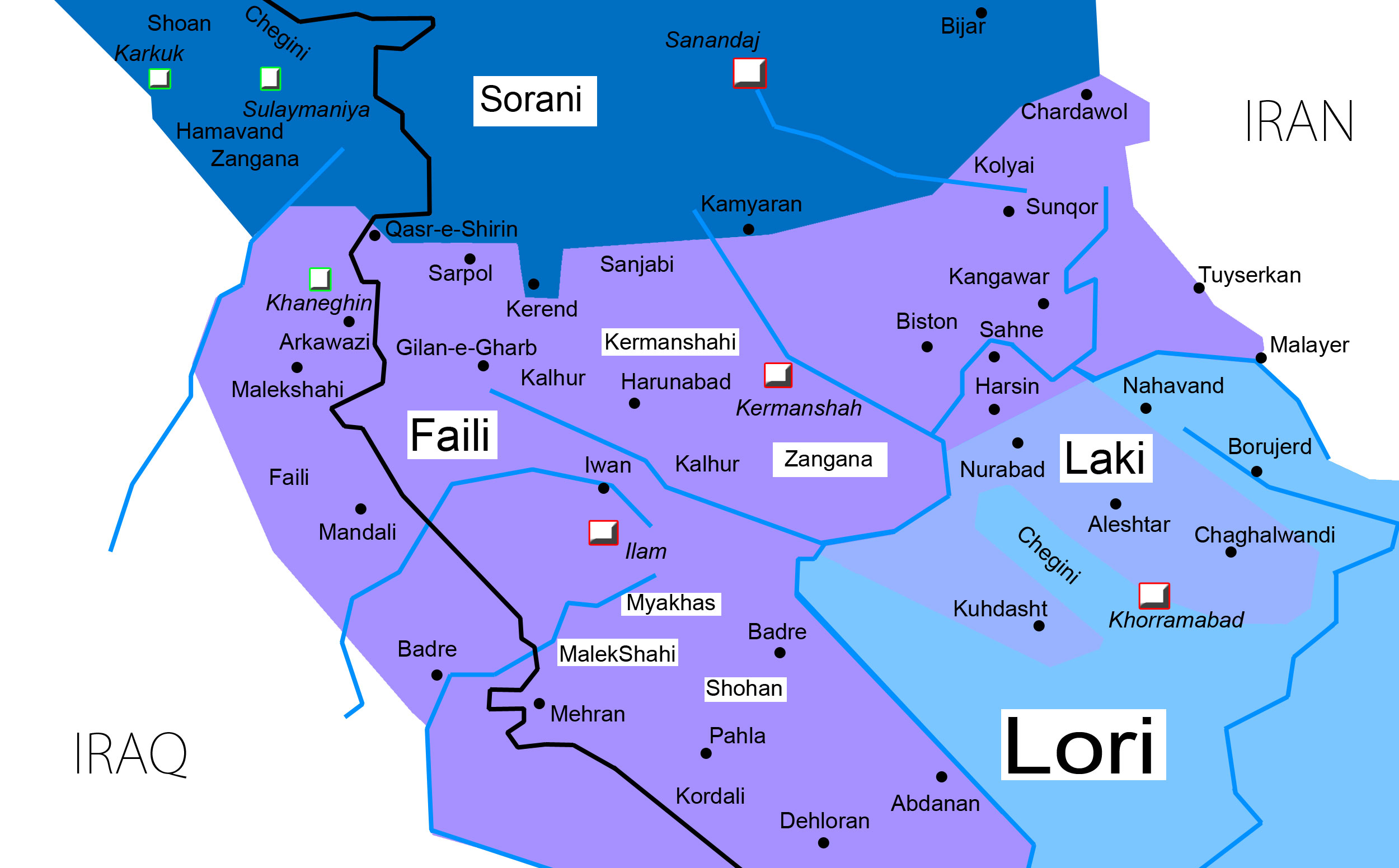
- A map of the regional dialects including the Feyli Kurds

Regions with significant populations
- Primarily in eastern Iraq and western Iran

Languages
- Feyli (Ilami) dialect of Southern Kurdish

Religion
- Predominantly Shia Islam, minority Yarsanism

Related ethnic groups
- Other Kurds

Feyli Kurds (Kurdish: فه‌یلی/فەێلی, romanized: Feylî) are a collection of Kurdish tribes in the borderlands between Iraq and Iran. Historically, the lands of the Feyli Kurds were ruled by the Vali dynasty. Feyli Kurds are distinct from Feyli Lurs, and they speak the Feyli dialect of Southern Kurdish, which is also known as "Ilami" and is distinct from the Feyli dialect of northern Luri. They are mostly Shia Muslims.

Feyli Kurdish was traditionally spoken in Ilam and Kermanshah provinces in Iran and in eastern Iraq. In 2017, their population was estimated around 1,500,000 in Iraq, mainly in Baghdad, but also the eastern parts of Diyala, Wasit, Maysan, and Basra provinces, and many in the Kurdistan Region. Mahdi Al-Tamimi, the director of the Office of the United Nations High Commissioner for Human Rights in Basra, estimated the total population of Feyli Kurds at more than 3,000,000 in 2020. In 2008, there were 7,000 Feyli Kurdish refugees from Iraq in Iran.

== Etymology ==
The term "Feyli" was associated with the Vali dynasty, and was applied to all tribes that were under their authority. While the Vali dynasty was Lur, it ruled over Kurdish, Lur, and Lak tribes. The tribes of Ilam and Lorestan provinces were all labelled Feyli during the Safavid period, whether they spoke Southern Kurdish, Luri, or Laki. While it was generally agreed that the term "Feyli" referred to the Vali dynasty and was applied to the tribes under their rule, there were different views over what the term "Feyli" actually meant and where it derived from.

From the Safavid to the Qajar eras, all the tribes living under the Vali dynasty were collectively referred to as "Feyli Lurs" in official settings, which also included the Kurdish tribes. Feyli Kurds were often mislabeled as Feyli Lurs in historical documents, mostly because Posht-e-Kuh was under Lur governance for over 700 years under the Khorshidis and Valis, thus being considered part of Lur-e-Kuchak, causing many writers throughout history to assume that Posht-e-Kuh was mostly Lur like the rest of Luristan. However, writers who personally went to Posht-e-Kuh, or did sufficient research, did mention the Feyli Kurds. They were also called the "Kurds of Feyli Luristan".

In Iraq, the term "Feyli Kurd" was initially applied to immigrants from Posht-e-Kuh, which were mostly Kurds. With the formation of the Iraqi state, it was gradually used for all Shia Kurds in the country, whether they had always been in the eastern regions or immigrated from Iran. After the 2003 invasion of Iraq, the Feyli Kurdish label expanded to include all Shia Kurds, regardless of where they came from, while some added that they appeared to be evolving into a sect if not an ethnic group. Historically, the term "Feyli" was sometimes used to generalize all dialects of Southern Kurdish or Northern Luri, although academics gradually stopped using the term by the 21st century due to its inherent ambiguity, and to avoid the conflation of Feyli Kurds and Feyli Lurs. Fattah instead referred to them as "Posht-e-Kuhi Kurds", adding that the population of Lur-e-Kuchak comprised "Posht-e-Kuhi Kurds", "Lak Kurds" and "Fayli Lors". He added that it was only some Kurds in Baghdad who identified with the term "Feyli".

== Origin ==
The region of Posht-e-Kuh had a Kurdish majority, with Lurs in the south and Laks in the east. Lurs were the majority of Pish-e-Kuh which had a Lak population in the north. Vladimir Minorsky described them as a Kurdish community living among the Feyli Lurs in Posht-e-Kuh and one of the Kurdish communities of Luristan, alongside the Lak tribes in the north. Garnik Asatrian also accounted for the Kurds of "western Luristan". According to Gilbert Lazard, a group identifying as ethnic Kurds had historically immigrated from northern Luristan to Baghdad, and their dialect also met the characteristics of Southern Kurdish. Alfons Gabriel wrote that the population of Posht-e-Kuh included "Feyli Lurs" in the south and "Kalhor Kurds" in the north. Chris Kutschera mentioned them as ethnic Kurds who migrated to Iraq from Iranian Luristan. The Feyli Kurds of eastern Iraq, who were mostly Shia Muslims speaking Southern Kurdish, were often ethnically linked to the Kurds of Kermanshah. Hamzeh'ee also wrote that the Feyli Kurds in eastern Iraq were related to the Kurds of Kermanshah, and David McDowall described them as being "of Kirmanshahi origin". According to G. B. Akopov, the Feyli Kurds in Posht-e-Kuh were in fact ethnic Kurds, although historically they did absorb some Lur elements which assimilated among them. Other scholars clarified that some historians had generalized the inhabitants of Posht-e-Kuh as Feyli Lurs because they were ruled by a Feyli Lur dynasty, while they actually spoke Kurdish and identified as Feyli Kurds.

In Iraq, the historic label "Irani ol-asl" ("originally Iranian") variously included people of Persian, Kurdish, and Lur heritage. Some Lurs had "spilled over into Iraq" in the Zagros foothills around Mandali and in towns along the Tigris, and were a much smaller community considered distinct from their Feyli Kurdish neighbors. The Feyli Kurds were also counted separately from the Iraqi Persians, who were the larger group in the 1980s, and 20th-century Feyli Kurdish immigrants from Ilam province to Iraq generally felt no connection with the Persian community there aside from their association to Iran. All three communities were similarly persecuted in the Ba'athist period, with the Iraqi Persians and Feyli Kurds being targeted in deportations, and the Lurs also undergoing a large-scale relocation to Iran.

== History ==
Feyli Kurds originated from the region historically known as Masabadhan. After the Islamic conquest of Iran, Masabadhan was frequently mentioned as a region of Jibal. The term Luristan came into use with the rise of the Lur dynasties such as the Khorshidis. Under the Lur dynasties, the region of Masabadhan became known as Posht-e-Kuh, and made up the western part of historical Lur-e-Kuchak. The Kurds of Masabadhan (and the wider Jibal region) were frequently mentioned by Arab historians after the Islamic conquests, after which several native Kurdish dynasties rose from the region, including the Hasanwayhids and Annazids.

According to the 12th century Mojmal al-Tawarikh, the Hasanwayhids originated from the rulers of Jibal and Masabadhan. The Hasanwayhids were a Kurdish dynasty which descended from Hasanwayh, who succeeded his maternal uncle, the last ruler of the Kurdish Aishanid dynasty. The Hasanwayhids were succeeded by the Annazids, another Kurdish dynasty which was related to them by marriage and in a rivalry with them. The Annazids ruled over a vast territory, on both sides of what later became the Iran–Iraq borderlands. After the Annazids collapsed, their territory was incorporated by the Lur Khorshidi dynasty, beginning the Lur governance over the region.

In 1655–1656, Evliya Çelebi travelled from Baghdad to Shahrizur and Erbil, passing through the Safavid vilayat of Lorestan, which he stated was under the Vali dynasty and independent from both the Safavids and Ottomans. He wrote about the presence of the "Kurds of Luristan" (Ekrad-i Luristan) in the region, as well as several mixed towns inhabited by both Luristani Kurds and Sunni Kurds. Martin van Bruinessen stated that it was likely that the "Luristani Kurds" mentioned by Evliya Çelebi were the Feyli Kurds. When the Russian-Ottoman-Persian boundary commission surveyed the borders from 1848 to 1852, Mehmed Hurşid Paşa, a member of the commission, wrote a travelogue in which he wrote that there were two main groups along the southern parts of the Ottoman-Iranian borders, the Arab Bani Lam and the Feyli tribes. He wrote that the Feyli tribes were "entirely Kurds" (kâffesi Ekrâd) and also "Persian subjects" (İran'a tâbi'i), and listed the tribes of Posht-e-Kuh and Pish-e-Kuh, which he estimated to be 50,000, and added that they were mostly Shia with Yarsani minorities and had scholars and poets which wrote in both Persian "and their own language, Gurani." Hurşid listed the Feyli tribes in Posht-e-Kuh as the Kord, Mahaki, Rizawand, Charkhesetun, Dinarwand, and Shadkhun, and those in Pish-e-Kuh as Kakawand, Bitiyawand, Muminawand, Bitirnawand, and Jawari, in addition to the Silsilah tribe in Dilfan, the Amala tribe, the Hulaylani tribes (Osmanwand, Jalalwand, Dajiyawand, Balawand, and Suramiri), the Bajalan tribes (Daliyawand and Sagwand), and the Beyranvand tribes (Aliyyawand and Dushiyyawand). Hurşid wrote that the city of Khanaqin and province of Kermanshah were Kurdish but not considered Feyli, and that the center of the Feyli Kurds was Dih-i-Bala. The Ottomans noted the existence of a Feyli community (Feyli ta'ifesi) in Kirkuk in 1910, while others were counted just as members of a tribe (Feyli aşireti).

Aziz al-Haj, a Feyli Kurdish scholar and ICP leader, in his book "Baghdad of That Time", wrote that the Feyli Kurds in Iraq descended from Kurdish tribes from Iran who entered Iraq to fight in the Revolt of Zulfiqar Khan and settled there afterwards. Many Feyli Kurds became part of Iraq after the Ottomans captured parts of their homeland during several border conflicts with Iran, while others came to Iraq later. At the beginning of the 19th century, many Feyli Kurds migrated westwards from Posht-e-Kuh across the border to eastern Iraq, where there was already a Feyli Kurdish community, and some went to Baghdad. Most of the Feyli Kurds in Iraq traced their origin to these migration waves from Iran, although some had always lived in Iraq. In 1928, the Iranian government ordered its consulate in Baghdad to provide Feyli Kurds with incentives to return to Iran. The Iranian consulate of Mandali in 1925 estimated that over 20,000 Feyli Kurds migrated from Iran to Iraq that year, with 10,000 in the Kurdish villages of eastern Iraq, 4,000 in Baghdad, and the rest in Kirkuk and southern Iraq. There were more Feyli Kurds in Iraq than in Iran. At the beginning of the 1920s, around 20,000 of the total population of 185,000–200,000 in Baghdad were Feyli Kurds. In 1936, after the Pahlavi government established authority in Posht-e-Kuh, the region was renamed Ilam. Feyli Kurds in Baghdad were historically second-class if not third-class citizens, and the main Feyli Kurdish community in Baghdad was known as "Aqd al-Akrad". Many of them also lived in slums.

Most Feyli Kurds in Iraq historically rejected Ottoman citizenship. During the British period after World War II and the early years of the Iraqi state, the Feyli Kurds in the Iraq-Iran border faced movement restrictions because of newly enforced border arrangements, and were given the choice between Iraqi or Iranian citizenship, with most choosing to become Iranian subjects but continued residing in Iraq. Their choice was likely prompted by liberal Iranian citizenship arrangements, and again, to avoid conscription in the state ruled by Sunni Arabs. As the newly enforced borders divided the traditional Feyli Kurdish homeland, those on the Iraqi side of the border were offered Iraqi citizenship, while their relatives across the border in Kermanshah and Ilam were not. As the allegiance of Feyli Kurds was generally to their tribe rather than the modern state, members of the same tribe often preferred to take up the same nationality, usually choosing what the majority had chosen. A sizeable amount of Feyli Kurds did not register with either country. By the 1940s, most Feyli Kurds in Iraq had applied to be registered as Iraqis and no longer wanted Iranian citizenship, although by that time, Iraqi citizenship laws had become very complicated.

In 1916, Muhammad Amin Zaki Beg went on an official trip to Posht-e-Kuh where he met the Vali. He wrote that he had no issues speaking Kurdish with the locals, who identified themselves as Kurds. He also wrote that even the Vali of Posht-e-Kuh knew Kurdish. Hossein-Ali Razmara, an officer in the geography unit of the Iranian Army, and older brother of Ali Razmara, visited Posht-e-Kuh in 1941 and wrote that most tribes were Kurdish and had an ancient presence there. In 1953, British historian Stephen Hemsley Longrigg mentioned the Feyli Kurds while writing about the political history of Iraq. He added that the land of the Lurs was divided into Greater and Lesser Luristan, the latter of which was divided into Pish-e-Kuh and Posh-e-Kuh, with Posht-e-Kuh being the home of the Feyli Kurds, who were familiar in Baghdad and Basra where they monopolized their occupation as porters of heavy loads, and lived as traders and craftsmen in the middle-Tigris and Gharraf regions, and also dominated Mandali, Badra, and the nearby villages.

The connection of the Feyli Kurds to the trade routes between Iran and Iraq gave them an important role in commerce. During the Jewish exodus after the declaration of the Israeli state in 1947, the Feyli Kurds quickly took over former Jewish businesses, and their status dramatically changed. In many cases, the Jewish businessmen fleeing Iraq simply handed their businesses over to their employees who were Feyli Kurds. However, the economy was again dominated by a minority which sharply differed from the Sunni Arab ruling class, and the traditional resentment of Jews had shifted over to the Feyli Kurds by the early 1950s. A Feyli Kurd became a member of the Baghdad Chamber of Commerce in the 1960s.

Before the Ba'athist era, most Feyli Kurds had been active in politics, in which they supported either the Kurdistan Democratic Party or the Iraqi Communist Party. The Feyli Kurds had a hybrid identity as ethnic Kurds, Iraqi nationals, and Shia Muslims. As Shias, they were a minority among the Kurds but a majority among the Arabs. As Kurds, they were a minority among the Arabs. While an Iraqi identity offered them a better position, the lack of Iraqi citizenship affected their attachment to Iraq. This situation encouraged many Feyli Kurds to join the Iraqi Communist Party which had campaigned against discrimination. While many of the Kurds from further north joined the ICP to transform Kurdish society, the Feyli Kurds usually joined the ICP to escape discrimination. The Feyli Kurds historically supported the ICP because most other parties were Arab nationalist. From the late 1950s, Feyli Kurds increasingly joined Kurdish nationalist parties, specifically the KDP. In the 1970s, many Feyli Kurds were leaders in the Kurdish national movement in Iraq and the wealthy Feyli Kurdish businessmen greatly contributed to the financing of the movement. The Feyli Kurds were actively persecuted throughout the Ba'athist period. The Iraqi government officially justified the persecution of Feyli Kurds by claiming they were originally Iranian, although its main goal was to reduce Kurdish influence in Iraq.

After the 2003 invasion of Iraq, many Feyli Kurds rose to prominent positions, including Fuad Hussein. Aras Habib Karim, a Feyli Kurd from a family with longstanding KDP ties, also served as the intelligence chief of the Iraqi National Congress. Feyli Kurds were recognized in the Iraqi constitution of 2005. Many Feyli Kurds complained about Western scholars portraying them as "Arabized Kurds." In November 2007, Sa'ad Iskandar, a Feyli Kurd serving as the director of the Iraqi national archive, strongly criticized a scholar for using the term and argued that it diminished the Kurdishness of the Feyli Kurds.

The Islamic Feyli Grouping, led by Miqdad al-Baghdadi, joined the United Iraqi Alliance for the 2005 elections and later joined the State of Law (SOL) bloc. The Feyli Kurdish Islamic Union, led by Tha'ir al-Fayli, initially joined the UIA for the January 2005 elections but withdrew and ran independently, later joining the SOL. From 2006 to 2010, Abdulsamad Rahman Sultan, a Feyli Kurd, served as the minister of migration and displacement under Nouri al-Maliki. The Feyli Kurdish Brotherhood List was established in 2012. Nouri al-Maliki helped establish the Feyli Kurdish Peace Organization for the 2014 elections. In the 2013 provincial elections, the Feyli Kurds were given two reserved seats, one in Baghdad and one in Wasit, with the Brotherhood List winning both seats, with Fu'ad Ali Akbar in Baghdad and Haydar Hisham al-Fayli in Wasit. For the 2018 elections, a seat was reserved in Wasit for the Feyli Kurds, which was won by independent politician Mazin Abdulmonim.

During the war on the Islamic State in 2014, the Peshmerga established a Feyli Kurdish militia, as part of several Yazidi, Kaka'i, and Christian militias under the Ministry of Peshmerga Affairs. The Popular Mobilization Forces also established a Feyli Kurdish militia under the Badr Brigades. After the 2017 Kurdistan Region independence referendum, Feyli Kurds in Baghdad became targets of Anti-Kurdish attacks, and many fled to the Kurdistan Region. They also established their own parties in the KRG. The Feyli Kurds, who traditionally centered their activism around ethnic identity, were increasingly targets of PMF recruitment after 2017, resulting in an emphasis on Shia identity among some of them. With the beginning of the 2020s, the KRG increased support for Feyli Kurds and announced plans to help them organize within an organization.

== Subdivisions ==
The Kurdish tribes which historically lived under the Vali dynasty were considered Feyli Kurds. They lived mainly in Ilam province and adjacent areas of eastern Iraq. Kurdish tribes which were considered Feyli included the Kordali, Malekshahi, Khezel, Dehbalayi, Kalhor, Hazara (Arkavazi-Boli), Suramiri, Rizavand, Mishkhas, Shuhan, Ali Sherwan, among many others.

== Language ==
The Feyli Kurds speak the Feyli dialect of southern Kurdish. Their dialect was also known as Ilami, as most of its speakers traditionally lived in Ilam province, and to distinguish it from the dialects of Northern Luri which were also called Feyli. By the 21st century, linguists gradually stopped using the term Feyli to avoid conflation as it was naturally an ambiguous term. Feyli Kurdish dialects were also called "Kurdish of the Vali" (کردی والی; Kordi-ye Vali), referring to the Vali of Luristan.

Historically, due to Lur governance, the Kurdish dialects of Ilam province (Posht-e-Kuh) were often incorrectly classified as Luri, although later and more thorough linguistic studies in the 20th and 21st centuries revealed their Kurdish nature.

The term Feyli was sometimes also applied incorrectly on all dialects of Southern Kurdish. Fattah claimed that Feyli Kurdish and the other dialects of Southern Kurdish were "interrelated and largely mutually intelligible." In Posht-e-Kuh, the largest language was traditionally Southern Kurdish.

Their dialect shared many similarities with the neighboring Sorani dialect. Many Feyli Kurds adopted Sorani as their literary language due to its more prestigious status.

== Notable Feyli Kurds ==
- Ghulamrezakhan Arkawazi, poet
- Fuad Hussein, politician
- Leyla Qasim, Kurdish national hero
- Sabah Mirza Mahmoud, bodyguard
- Aras Habib, politician
- Ahmed Yasin, footballer
- Jalal Abdul-Rahman, footballer

== See also ==
- Kurdish tribes
