= Suramiri (tribe) =

Kurdish tribe living mainly in Iraq and Iran

The Suramiri (Kurdish: سوورەمێری, Sûremêrî; Persian: سوره‌میری) are a Kurdish tribe living in parts of Iran and Iraq. They traditionally speak Southern Kurdish and follow Yarsanism and Shia Islam.

== History ==
Jafar Khital, who documented oral tradition among the tribes of Ilam province, mentioned two stories about the Suramiri tribe. One of the stories he heard in Darrehshahr claimed that during the Abbasid era, a son of Musa al-Kazim fled to Posht-e-Kuh (then Jibal), and two men were sent to find him, but eventually took his side during a dispute and became his followers. One of them married into the Balu'i tribe, while the descendants of the other one entered the service of Sayyid Ibrahim (Surahim), a son of Muhammad al-Baqir, who had a shrine in Zarrinabad. The other story he heard was from Suramiri elders descended from the historic tribe leader Hoseyn-Ali Khan bin Safar-Ali bin Hoseyn bin Nawruz-e Sorkhamehri, also in Darrehshahr in the Seymareh region, where some of the tribe settled after they were expelled from Posht-e-Kuh by the Vali dynasty. They claimed that during the Abbasid era, Sayyid Ibrahim ibn Musa al-Kazim, also known as Baba Bozorg, came to Jibal fleeing oppression, and sought refuge with in Posht-e-Kuh with a local elderly woman and her son, named Sorkheh-Mard or Sura-Mard, a young herder living in a tent. His name literally meant "red face", referring to his reddish tan from his pale complexion. The Abbasids, in pursuit of Baba Bozorg, attacked the tent, capturing Sura-Mard as they advanced towards Khorasan. His mother pursued the Abbasids and again encountered Baba Bozorg, who transformed into a merchant, and freed Sura-Mard after paying the Abbasids with red banknotes, and he became the ancestor of the Suramiri tribe.

The name of the tribe was historically spelled in various ways, including Suramiri (سوره‌میری), Sorkhamehri (سرخه‌مهری), Sadamiri (ساده‌میری), Sayamiri (سایه‌میری), Suramehri (سوره‌مهری), Suramehdi (سوره‌مهدی), and Sormili (سرمیلی), or Surmali (سورملی). It had also been spelled as Sorkhameri (سرخامری), Surameri (سوره‌مری), and Süramiri (سیوره‌میری or سویره‌میری). A reason the name of the tribe had various spellings was that Arabs were less familiar with Kurdish dictation during the early Iraqi state and often misspelled their names. The first story documented by Jafar Khital linked the name of the tribe to their service for Sayyid Ibrahim (Surahim), while the second story suggested that their ancestor was called "Sura-Mehr-Ali", which became "Suramiri" over time with local pronunciation, and became the name of his descendants. Others derived the name of the Suramiri tribe from "Sura-kar-mehri", a matronymic meaning "Sura, son of Mehri", referring to a man named Sura or Sorkheh, whose mother was named Mehri. Those who traced the origin of the Suramiri tribe to Sorkhab Ayyar also derived their name from him. Others linked the name of the Suramiri tribe to folklore that they historically worshipped Mithra (Mehr) or Anahita.

There was a prominent claim that the ancestor of the Suramiri tribe was Sorkhab Ayyar of the Annazid dynasty. Some also claimed that the Suramiri tribe descended from Sari-Geri or Sari-Gerd, a son of Bahram Gur, and that the Rizavand and Ali-Beygi, two other nearby Kurdish tribes, descended from his two other sons. Others claimed the Suramiri tribe had affinities to the Soran Emirate.

As a Shia Kurdish tribe, the Suramiri were historically included under the Kordali label before it narrowed to just the Kordali tribe. According to tribal folklore, the Suramiri accepted Shia Islam and joined the supporters of Baba Bozorg, whose shrine was located around Delfan, northeast of the Khaveh plain, although the shrine was associated with Yarsanism rather than Twelver Shi'ism. Historical records kept at the shrine of Baba Bozorg mentioned that he was killed in the region of Delfan by a certain "Sohrab Sorkhamili" (سهراب سرخه‌میلی). The Suramiri tribe were actively persecuted by the Vali dynasty, especially during the late Safavid and early Zand periods. During the rule of Shahverdi Khan and his son Ismail Khan, the Vali dynasty intensified the suppression of the Lak tribes which had generally become rebellious and insubordinate. Some Suramiri elders claimed that the tribe was oppressed since the arrival of Baba Bozorg who introduced them to Shia Islam.

A prominent historical figure from the tribe was Silimo Surkha Mihrī, who composed Laki poetry in the Qajar period, although nothing else was known about him. The conflict between the Suramiri tribe and the Vali dynasty reached its worst during the rule of Hasan Khan, as the Suramiri tribe had waged a rebellion that was brutally suppressed, and resulted in the tribe being dispersed and largely expelled from Posht-e-Kuh, as their tribal structure also collapsed. The dispersion of the Suramiri after they were expelled had also caused them to become fragmented, with tribes such as the Rizavand emerging as independent tribe. Others suggested that the tribes of Payravand and Bijanvand also had the same origin and emerged as independent tribes after the dispersal of the Suramiri. After leaving their traditional land in Posht-e-Kuh, the Suramiri tribe mostly settled in Khanaqin, as well as Miqdadiyah, and other districts of Diyala. Much of the region of Haftab (or Haftaw; around Heydarabad), belonged to the Suramiri tribe before they were expelled, and the Mishkhas later emerged as the main tribe. The Suramiri established themselves as one of the main Kurdish tribes in Khanaqin, and Iraq in general.

The Suramiri were often listed as a tribe of Holeylan, and Frederick Charles Maisey added that they were also casually included as part of Kermanshah. Mehmed Hurşîd Paşa, a member of the Russian-Ottoman-Persian commission to survey the borders from 1848 to 1852, mentioned the tribe of "Sûremerî" among the Kurdish tribes of Khanaqin who were Ottoman subjects, but also mentioned the "Sûre Merî" or "Sûrha Merî" among the Feyli tribes who were Iranian subjects and were "entirely Kurds" (kâffesi Ekrâd). He had also spelt their name as "Süre Mîrî", "Sürha Mîrî", and "Süremeri". In April 1918, the Suramiri tribe, alongside the Bajalan and Dilo tribes in Khanaqin, comprised a British contingent of two hundred Kurdish tribal auxiliaries, and fought the Ottomans along the Diyala River. The tribe leader at the time, Muhammad Bey Suramiri, was a fierce anti-Turkish commander close to the British. Abbas al-Azzawi mentioned the Suramiri tribe as part of the Lak confederation of Kurdish tribes in Iraq, and described them as followers of Yarsanism, also stressing that they were not part of the Feyli tribes, historically subjected to the Vali dynasty, despite living together.

The subgroups of the Suramiri tribe were unclear as the tribe was historically dispersed in small groups across a vast region. Sediq Safizadeh described the Suramiri as a Kurdish tribe around Khanaqin, which comprised the clans of Qaytul, Tutak, Kalavani, Mamajan, and Kheyvelian, and was historically led by an Ottoman subject named Sura-Mir. Sheikh Mohammad Mardukh listed the Suramiri as a Kurdish tribe comprising the clans of Tutak, Antar, Ayina, Mamajan, and Kalhuri, numbering around 2,025 households on the edges of Khanaqin, with the Antar clan also living between Miqdadiyah and Abu Jisra. Muhammad Amin Zaki gave similar information, although with only 225 households. In 1918, Ely Bannister Soane also gave similar information, and added that the Suramiri had migrated to Khanaqin around 100 years earlier from Zohab alongside the Bajalan, and had earlier migrated to Zohab from Holeylan. A collection of British military records titled "Kurdistan and the Kurds" mentioned the Suramiri as having "came originally from Hulailan in Luristan, followed the Bajlan from Zohab and settled round Khaniqin; its chiefs are Muhammad Bey and Husein Bey; its five sub-tribes are called Kalhuri, Tutik, Mamajan, Aina and Antar."

There were several tribes which shared origin with the Suramiri but later split due to the dispersal of the tribe. The Rizavand, and also Ali-Beygi, were commonly said to have the same origin as the Suramiri. Others suggested that the Suramiri were possibly related to the Balavand tribe. Many of the Suramiri tribe which remained in Posht-e-Kuh after they were expelled by the Vali dynasty were absorbed by larger local tribes, with those who remained around Mehran and Dehloran being absorbed by tribes such as the Malekshahi, Mimayi, Kaveri, and Bapirvand. Most of the Suramiri who stayed in Posht-e-Kuh were absorbed by the Malekshahi tribe, and identified with both tribes. The clans of Khairsha, Sadamiri, Hamana-Wadush, Golga, and Jom'a, within the Malekshahi tribe, were said to be originally Suramiri. The Kaka-Ali clan of the Mamiyavand tribe and the Sharaf clan of the Shuhan tribe were reportedly also originally Suramiri. Other clans said to have Suramiri origins included the Qotbin, Mia, and Nuri clans of the Qotbuddin and Khalil tribes, as well as the Kharbazani clan, which was absorbed by the Shahlarvand tribe and later the Bazgir tribe. The clans of Moghila, Sanali, and Batoli were reportedly part of the Gelalziri tribe before being absorbed by the Ali-Badrayi tribe, and some claimed that the Gelalziri were originally Suramiri. The families of Suramehri, Shahrani, and Sormili, prominent families in Nahavand and Tehran, were originally Suramiri. Some also suggested that the clans of Panjasetun and Melkhatawi within the Malekshahi tribe may have been originally Suramiri.

The Suramiri traditionally spoke Southern Kurdish as their native language. Before their dispersal by the Vali dynasty, the Suramiri tribe was mainly concentrated in Posht-e-Kuh and adjacent parts of eastern Iraq. By the 21st century, the Suramiri tribe in Iran mainly lived in the Kermanshah, Ilam, Lorestan, and Hamadan provinces, including Gilan-e Gharb, Islamabad-e Gharb, Chamchamal, Harsin, Ilam, Darrehshahr, Aleshtar, Kuhdasht, Malayer, and Nahavand, while those in Iraq mainly lived in Khanaqin, Zorbatiya, Ali al-Gharbi, and Ali al-Sharqi. Some Suramiri settled in Fasa and around Khuzestan during the rule of Karim Khan Zand. The tribe had much of its land confiscated by the Ba'athist government which also relocated many of them to Arab regions. They were one of the seven Kurdish tribes of particular concern for the government, and the first tribe to be targeted.

During the 1991 Iraqi uprisings, Akbar Haydar Khanaqini, a senior KDP politician, from the Suramiri tribe, supported the Peshmerga in taking over Khanaqin. In May 2019, the leader of the Suramiri tribe, Kamil Jamil Beg, criticized the deterioration of the region and displacement of locals after the 2017 Kirkuk crisis, and declared that his tribe supported the KRG, while calling on the Peshmerga to redeploy units to the disputed territories for Kurds that did not trust Iraqi security forces. In January 2026, Shukr Mahmud Aziz Agha became the Suramiri tribe leader, succeeding his elder brother, and all Kurdish tribe leaders attended the ceremony.

== See also ==
- Kurdish tribes
