= Dilo (tribe) =

Kurdish tribe living mainly in Iraq

Delo (Kurdish: دەلۆ, Delo) is a Kurdish tribe living mainly in northern Iraq. The tribe was traditionally concentrated around Kirkuk, Jalawla, and Khanaqin. They are mostly Sunni Muslims. Delo is part of Lak (tribe). Dilo Tribe is Speak Kalhuri/Sorani

== History ==
The Dilo tribe were an important Kurdish tribe around Kirkuk. The Dilo tribe historically had a castle named Diz-i Deloya and they gave asylum to the Annazid Kurds there. Mehrdad Izady reported that the Dilo tribe was made up of the clans of Gash, Jamrezi, Karez, Panjankushti, Salim Waysi, and Taskawand, and lived in the Khush mountains near Sarkala and Khanaqin. Ely Banister Soane listed the clans of the Dilo tribe as Jamrezi, Panjangushti, Gachi, Tarkawand, Kahrezi, and Selim Waisi. He wrote that the Dilo tribe lived near Qaradagh and Kifri and was mainly under the leadership of Mahmud Beg, who was pro-British, and Khurshid Beg, who was pro-Ottoman, and that they were on bad terms. They had been exiled to different villages on the border to protect it from the Sanjabi Kurds of Iran. The Dilo tribe was often rebellious and commonly allied with the Hamawand tribe. Sheikh Mardukh mentioned the Dilo tribe as six hundred families in Kirkuk, Kifri, and Khanaqin, consisting of the clans of Kash, Jamrezi, Panjankushti, Karezi, Tarkawand, and Salim Wais.

Claudius James Rich mentioned a mountain named Ali Dilo in Qaradagh. He specifically mentioned it as a hill between Qaradagh and Ibrahim Khanji. He also mentioned a nearby district named Dilo. He also wrote that the Dilo and Zangana were along the inhabitants of Kifri. Mohammad Amin Zaki wrote that the Kurdish poet Hasan Katush of Sulaymaniyah was either from the Dilo tribe or Hamanjiya tribe.

After the Arab Revolt, the Dilo tribe, along with the Suramiri and Bajalan tribes, were the first Kurdish tribes employed by the British to fight against the Ottomans. In total they made up a contingent of 200 tribesmen which fought the Ottomans along the upper Diyala River in April 1918. However, a year after the 1919 revolt of Mahmud Barzinji, which boosted Kurdish nationalism, the Dilo, Zangana, Dawudi, and other Kurdish tribes in the southern part of the Kirkuk division revolted against the British occupation. During the Iraqi revolt of 1920, Phillip Willard Ireland wrote that the Dilo Kurds did most of the revolt in the cities of Khanaqin and Qizil Ribat, which fell on August 14, but that their revolt had no trace of the national aspirations of the wider Iraqi revolt.

The Dilo tribe seized the district of Kifri and killed the British officer Captain Talment, before being expelled by the British. The tribe was under the leadership of Waysi Bek and Ibrahim Khan. Kurdish participation in the 1920 Iraqi revolt was limited due to damage sustained during the 1919 revolt of Mahmud Barzinji and activities of the Al-Ahd Society (Pro-British Arab nationalists). However, by the time the 1920 revolt had reached the Middle Euphrates, the Dilo tribe had mobilized and captured the city of Khanaqin. Khurshid Bek, leader of the Dilo tribe who was head of the Mujahideen Society during Ottoman rule, was appointed as governor of the city. When the Arab tribes of Jubur, Rabi‘a, and Bani Wais living near Qizil Ribat had heard of the news, they besieged Khanaqin until the British took control again in August 1920 and expelled Khurshid Bek. When the British captured Khanaqin and Miqdadiya, they left Mandali alone but sent a messenger demanding the release of the detained governor. The government of Mandali sent the governor along with his family to the Dilo tribe which returned him to the British.
