= Disputed territories of northern Iraq =

Geographic territories

The largest extent of the territory claimed to have been Arabised (unofficial map); Kurdistan Region; Unrecognised incorporated territory; Other claimed and controlled territory; Other claimed territory; Rest of Iraq

The disputed territories of northern Iraq (Arabic: المناطق المتنازع عليها في العراق, Kurdish: ناوچە جێناکۆکەکانی عێراق) are regions defined by article 140 of the Constitution of Iraq as being Arabised during Ba'ath Party rule in Iraq. The article stipulates that the Iraqi government must "normalize" these areas; effectively reverse the actions of the previous regime and reimburse those affected. The Committee for Implementing Article 140 defines these territories as including the following areas: parts of Nineveh Governorate, Erbil Governorate, Diyala Governorate and the entirety of Kirkuk Governorate. Most of these regions are inhabited by non-Arabs, including Kurds, Assyrians, Yazidis, Turkmens, and Shabaks. Although article 140 includes a deadline, which is 31 December 2007, as of May 2026 it remains to be implemented.

The disputed areas have been a core concern for many Arabs, Assyrians, Kurds, and Turkmens, especially since the 2003 U.S. invasion of Iraq and the subsequent political restructuring. The Kurdistan Regional Government gained control of more territory after 2003, taking over land they claimed as part of "Iraqi Kurdistan", such as Aqrah District and Shaykhan District.

Kurdish officials in Iraq have alleged that in 2017 the Iraqi state began a new strategy of demographic engineering in the disputed territories, dubbed "Administrative Arabization", which includes "the replacement of Kurdish officials in senior administrative posts and changes related to land and agricultural contracts" as well as settling Arabs onto lands belonging to Kurdish farmers. They alleged in 2026 that the Iraqi government is conducting Arabisation through bureaucratic mechanisms instead of direct population transfers. The main Kurdish tribes in the region targeted by the Ba'athist government were the tribes of Zargush, Qaralus, Kaka'i, Gurkush, Suramiri, and Arkawazi.

== Implementation ==
During the administration of Prime Minister Nouri al-Maliki, he issued Executive Order No. 46 establishing the Committee for Implementing Article 140 of the Iraqi Constitution. Among its tasks was to define the disputed territories and oversee their "normalisation", as well as conducting a census and thereafter a referendum which would decide whether they will be incorporated into Kurdistan Region or remain under federal control.

The article stipulates a deadline, which meant that the aforementioned processes needed to be completed at a date not exceeding 31 December 2007. After the Iraqi government refused to implement the article before as well as after the deadline, tensions began to increase between the federal government and the Kurdistan Regional Government (KRG).

In April 2012, Masoud Barzani, president of Kurdistan Region, demanded that officials agree to their demands regarding power sharing and territorial control or face secession from Baghdad by September 2012.

In September 2012, the Iraqi government ordered the KRG to transfer its powers over Peshmerga to the central government. Relations were strained further by the formation of a new command center (Tigris Operation Command) for Iraqi forces to operate in a disputed area over which both Baghdad and the KRG claim jurisdiction.

On November 16, 2012, a military clash between the Iraqi forces and the Peshmerga resulted in one person being killed. CNN reported that 2 people were killed (one of them an Iraqi soldier) and 10 wounded in clashes at the town of Tuz Khurmatu.

On the night of November 19, clashes between security forces of the central Iraqi government and the KRG forces in Tigrit left 12 Iraqi soldiers and one civilian dead, according to Demirören News Agency. The clash erupted when Iraqi soldiers attempted to enter northern Iraq; Peshmarga tried to prevent the Iraqi soldiers from entering the area upon Barzani's instructions. On November 25, it was reported that Kurdistan Region sent reinforcements to a disputed area where its troops were involved in a standoff with the Iraqi army, despite calls on both sides for dialogue to calm the situation.

During the Islamic State offensive in 2014, the KRG took advantage of the situation and the Peshmerga forces took over large parts of the disputed territories.

In 2017, KRG conducted an independence referendum and attempted to secede all of the territory it had hitherto managed to gain. Iraq, Turkey and Iran uniformly rejected the referendum, with the Iraqi federal government retaliating militarily and retaking all of the areas, including Kirkuk Governorate, strategically important because of its oil fields, during the 2017 Iraqi-Kurdish conflict. The conflict left 400 Kurdish civilians dead, at least 200 dead Peshmerga and displaced hundreds of thousands of Kurds. The conflict reversed all of the Kurds' previous gains since 2014, with the independence referendum being seen as a strategic blunder. The Israeli Jerusalem Institute for Strategy and Security stated: "It would have been better for the Kurds to settle for strengthening their autonomous region in Iraq rather than challenging their stronger neighbors." Furthermore, their inability to militarily defend the territory they hitherto controlled, cast "serious doubts on the long-term prospects of the Kurds". The Washington Institute for Near East Policy stated that after the defeat that the Kurds suffered in 2017 the balance of power that once favored the KRG shifted in Baghdad’s favor.

Since 2017, the Iraqi government has been conducting Arabisation in the disputed territories with no regard for the implementation of article 140. Kurdish defeat following the 2017 conflict and the subsequent "fall of Kurdish power" has been considered a determining factor in the article's lack of implementation.

== Territories included ==
The Committee for implementing article 140 defines the disputed territories as those areas that were Arabised and whose borders were modified between July 17, 1968, and April 9, 2003. Those areas include parts of four governorates in pre-1968 borders.

One of the major problems in trying to implement Article 140 was a discrepancy in the definition of 'disputed area'. The article only refers to regions that would go through this normalization process as "Kirkuk and other disputed areas". In 2003, Kurdish negotiator Mahmud Othman suggested that Kurdish-majority areas south of the Green Line be attached to the KRG immediately, and 'mixed areas' should be questioned on a case-by-case basis. Sunni Arabs felt as if Kurds should gain no additional land as a result of the US invasion. Reattaching Kirkuk districts to reflect the 1975 boundaries posed many problems for Iraqis and brought along unintended consequences.

=== Nineveh Governorate ===
Nineveh Governorate includes Aqra District and the northern part of Al-Shikhan District, which have been under Kurdish control since 1991, later, even the three districts of the Nineveh Plains of Assyrian, Yazidi and Shabak population as well as Sinjar town and Tel Afar District of mixed Arab and Yazidi population. Sinjar District and northern parts of Tel Afar District and Nineveh Plains is currently under the control of federal government of Iraq, as are most of Al-Hamdaniya (also called Bakhdida), Tel Kaif Districts, and everything else in the Governorate north of the Tigris River.

=== Erbil Governorate ===
The disputed territories include Makhmur District which has been separated from the rest of the governorate since 1991. Since the 2017 Iraqi–Kurdish conflict, the district is controlled entirely by the federal government.

=== Kirkuk Governorate ===
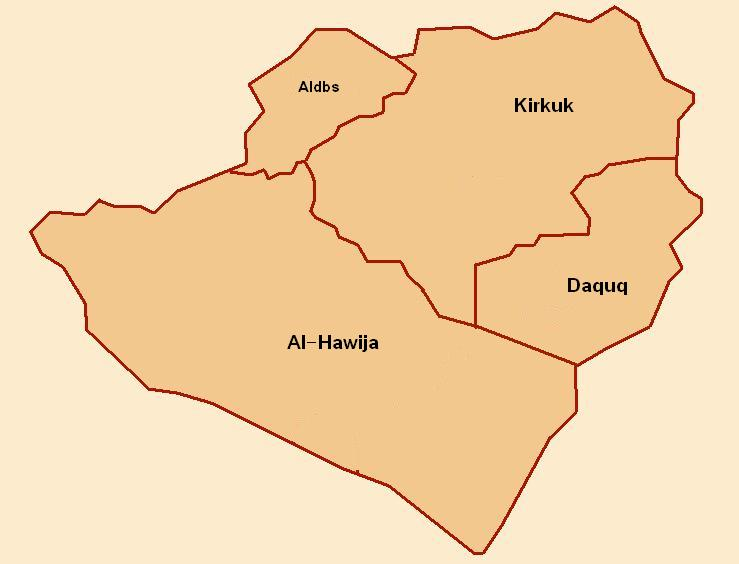
Districts of Kirkuk Governorate

Kirkuk Governorate is defined by its pre-1968 borders, including Chamchamal and Kalar districts of Sulaymaniyah Governorate and Tooz District of Salah ad Din and Kifri District of Diyala.

Kirkuk province borders were altered, the Kurdish-dominated districts were added to Erbil and Sulamaniya Governorates. The Arab districts were added to Kirkuk Governorate. Turkmen villages were added to Diyala and Salahuddin Governorates. On June 12, 2014, all of Kirkuk Governorate was taken by Kurdish forces when Iraqi army withdrew following the success of the ISIL 2014 Northern Iraq offensive. Subsequently, after the battle of Kirkuk (2017) the Iraqi central government reinstated control over the governorate.

Census results for Kirkuk Governorate
Mother tongue	1957	Percentage	1977	Percentage	1997	Percentage
Kurds	187,593	48.2%	184,875	38%	155,861	21%
Arabs	109,620	28.2%	218,755	45%	544,596	72%
Turkmens	83,371	21.4%	80,347	17%	50,099	7%
Assyrians	1,605	0.4%				
Jews	123	0.03%				
Other	6,545	1.77%	0	0%	2,189	0.3%
Total	388,829	100%	483,977	100%	752,745	100%

=== Diyala and other governorates ===
Other territories that Kurds have claimed include Khanaqin, Kifri and Baladrooz districts of Diyala Governorate, Tooz District which is currently part of Salah ad Din Governorate, and Badra District which is currently part of Wasit Governorate.

== See also ==
- Kirkuk status referendum
- List of disputed territories
