= Qaralusi (tribe) =

Kurdish tribe living mainly in eastern Iraq

The Qaralusi (Kurdish: قەرەلووسی, Qerelûsî) are a Kurdish tribe living mainly in eastern Iraq around Mandali near the Iran–Iraq border. They speak Southern Kurdish and mostly follow Shia Islam.

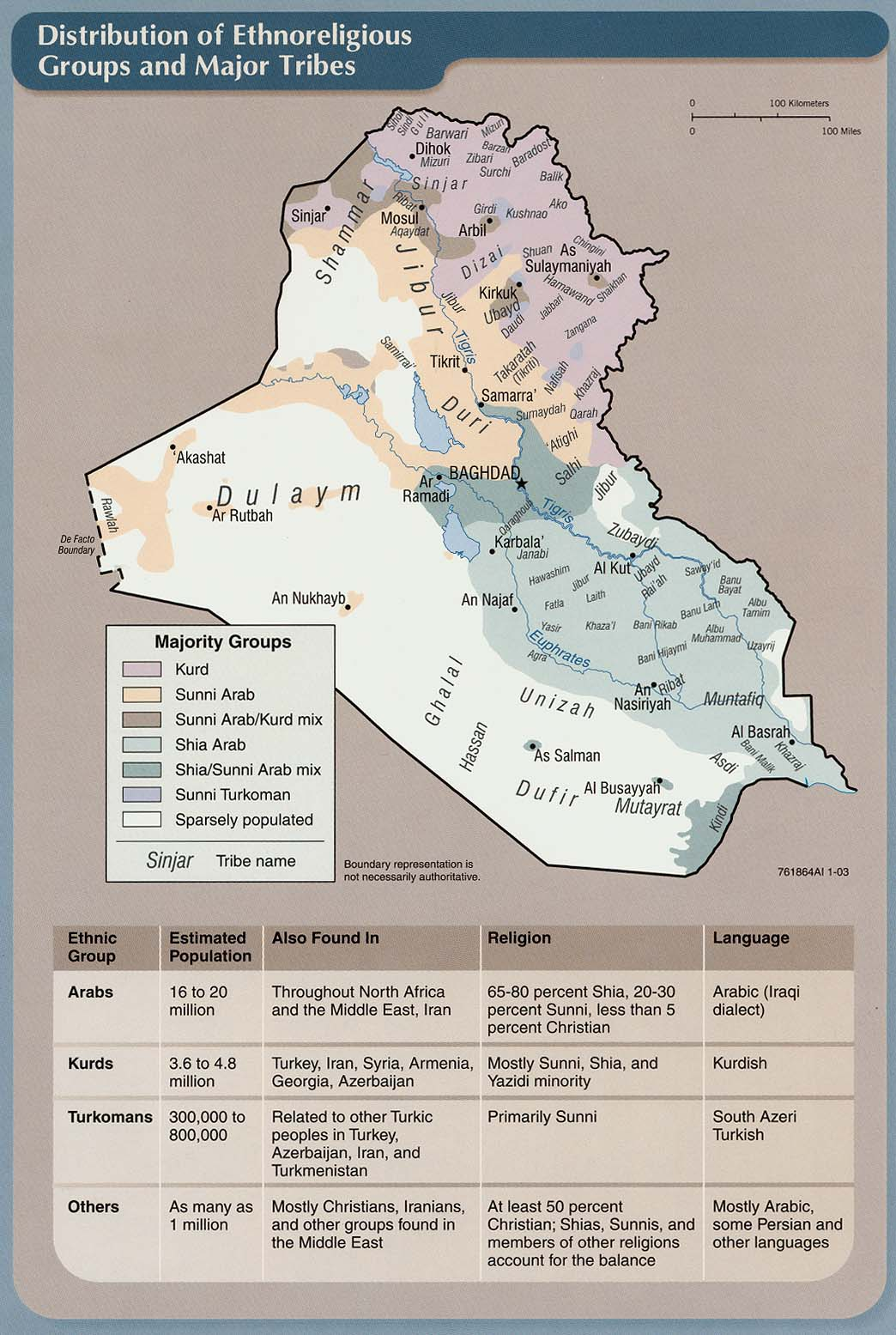
A map of Iraq from the CIA Factbook in 2003, showing the Qaralusi around Mandali among the Kurdish tribes

== History ==
The Qaralusi were traditionally known as a Shia majority Kurdish tribe mainly concentrated around Mandali. They were mentioned in Tarikh-e Alam-ara-ye Abbasi as having moved from Hamadan to Lorestan to seek refuge with the Khorshidi Atabek Shahverdi Khan, but were later deported elsewhere after Hoseyn Khan Solvizi came to power. During the Ottoman-Iranian border dispute, they were attacked by forces of Hoseynqoli Khan. In Tarikh-e Mardukh, the Qaralusi tribe (قره‌الوس) was said to comprise around 2,000 households at the edges of Khanaqin and Mandali, and consisted of 6 clans, the Gash, Katiyun, Naftchi, Kakawand, Charmawandi, and Gawsuwari. Mardukh added that there was a separate tribe of the same origin as the Qara-Alus but pronounced 'Alus (قره‌علوس). Ely Bannister Soane described the tribe as the southernmost Kurdish tribe in Iraq engaged in agriculture, sheep herding, petroleum, and donkey transport, also being peaceful but good fighters if provoked, and speaking "extreme Southern Kurdish, not Kurmanji", also being entirely Shia Muslims. He divided the tribe into the clans of Gachi, Qaytun, Charmawandi, Kakawand, Naftchi, and Gawsuwari. Many of the Qaralusi became targets of violence by Sunni extremist groups during the Iraqi civil war. They later began a large-scale political campaign to recover their losses.

Historically, there was another Kurdish tribal group known as Kara Ulus (the "black nation"). The Ottomans had created nomadic tribal confederations, or people ("ulus"), to serve the state. The two major confederations were the Kara Ulus and the Boz Ulus (the "grey nation"). The Boz Ulus, a remnant of the Aq Qoyunlu confederacy, consisted of Turkoman and Kurdish tribes, while the Kara Ulus was almost entirely Kurdish.
