= Payravand (tribe) =

Kurdish tribe mainly in Iran

The Payravand (Kurdish: پایرەوەن, Payrewen; Persian: پایروند, پایره‌وند) are a Kurdish tribe living mainly in western Iran, mostly in the provinces of Kermanshah and Ilam. They mainly speak Southern Kurdish.

== History ==
Minorsky described the "Payrawand" or "Pahrawand" as a Kurdish tribe near Kermanshah, and associated their name with their homeland on the west face of Mount Paraw (Bisotun). Others also mentioned a Kurdish tribe named Payravand or Pahravand (پهروند). The name Farawand in historical sources may have been connected to the Payravand (Pahravand) tribe as the Arabized version. There was also a village near Kermanshah named Payravand. The name of the Payravand tribe was also pronounced Padravand (پادروند).

The Payravand spoke a dialect of Southern Kurdish. The Payravand were mentioned in a list of the local Lak tribes compiled by J. L. Rousseau at Kermanshah in 1807. The Payravand traditionally spent winters around Mount Paraw, Bilavar, and Dizgaran, and summers in Zohab, Qasr-e Shirin, and Qala Sabzi. The Payravand were also among the Kurdish tribes in Qazvin. The Payravand, along with the other Kurdish tribes of Rizavand and Bijanvand, were said to have been originally part of the Suramiri tribe. During the Qajar era, the Payravand and Rizavand made an alliance with the Khezel tribe. The Payravand mainly lived in Zardalan, Piyazabad, and Shilekosh.
