= Rizavand (tribe) =

Kurdish tribe living mainly in Iran

The Rizavand (Kurdish: رێزەوەن, Rêzewen; Persian: ریزه‌وند، ریزوند), also known as Chardawli (Kurdish: چواردەوڵی; Persian: چهاردولی، چاردولی) are a Kurdish tribe living mainly in western Iran. They speak Southern Kurdish, as well as Sorani Kurdish, Azerbaijani, and Persian, and are mostly Shia Muslims.

== History ==
The tribe name in Kurdish was spelled "رێزەوەن" (Rêzewen). In Persian, it was spelled "ریزوند", or "ریزه‌وند". The tribe was also known as Chardawli, spelled "چهاردولی" or "چاردولی" in Persian, and "چواردەوڵی" in Kurdish. Their name was also pronounced Chardawri, spelled "چرداوری" in Persian.

Mehmed Hurşîd Paşa, a member of the Russian-Ottoman-Persian boundary commission which surveyed the borders from 1848 to 1852, listed the Rizavand as a Feyli Kurdish tribe of Posht-e-Kuh. The Rizavand tribe were originally Kalhor Kurds native to the region called Chardavol or Rizavand in the north of Ilam province. Their native language was the Rizavandi dialect of Kurdish. While some stayed in Ilam, most of the tribe later scattered and migrated in several large waves to other provinces in Iran, mainly Hamadan, Kurdistan, West Azerbaijan, Khuzestan, and Kermanshah. After their migrations, they were also known as Chardawli, after their native region in Ilam province. The Rizavand was often listed as part of the Kalhor tribes. The Kurdish tribe of Rizavand (ریزه‌وند) was not to be confused with the Bakhtiari tribe of Rizavand (رضاوند), or the tribe of Rizavand (رضاوند) which was part of the Payamni tribe affiliated with the Sagvand.

The Rizavand, along with the tribes of Payravand and Bijanvand, were said to have been part of the Suramiri, which rebelled against Hasan Khan of the Vali dynasty when he came to power in Posht-e-Kuh, after which they were suppressed and persecuted, with their tribal structures collapsing as they were scattered to different regions and gradually split into separate tribes. The Suramiri moved westwards to Khanaqin. They were largely expelled from Posht-e-Kuh. Some Rizavand also moved to Iraq and identified with the Suramiri Kurds. The Rizavand mainly lived in Chardavol in Ilam and parts of Kermanshah. Some historians also suggested the Rizavand of Ilam was related to the Rutavand of Kermanshah, another Kurdish tribe. Smaller clans within the Rizavand in Ilam province included Sarableh, Kalhor, Shayabi Seh Baqle, and Badr Abadi.

Eugene Aubin described them as a Lak tribe established around Fars, although when Agha Mohammad Khan Qajar, he trained several loyalist factions, which included a thousand Chardawli families. When the king died, the Chardawli leader, Norouz Khan, fled westwards towards Miandoab and deserted. Others also noted the historic conflict between the Chardawli and the Afshar tribes. Sheikh Mardukh referred to them as "Charduli or Chardawri", and estimated them at around 200 families living near the Esfandiyarabad region around Sanandaj. Pierre Oberling stated that the tribe was moved to Fars before the Qajars, and then to Qazvin by Agha Mohammad Khan Qajar, and then to the region around Miandoab and Sain Qaleh by Abbas Mirza, and during his visit to their community in 1960, he counted them at 2,000 families, almost entirely sedentary, occupying 38 to 40 villages mostly to the north of the road linking Miandoab and Sain Qaleh, and speaking Turkic and following Shia Islam. He claimed their name was given to them after defeating four tribes in battle.

The Chardawli tribe in Kurdistan province joined the Kalhor, Jaf, Sheikh Ismaili, and Goran tribes in the failed revolt of Salar od Dowla Qajar who tried to win the support of Kurdish tribes. The Rizavand, alongside the Khezel and Bijanvand tribes, which were neighbors in northern Ilam province, had independently resisted the Russian invasion of Ilam province during World War I, while the Vali of Posht-e-Kuh did not resist and was mainly concerned about preserving his rule.

Some of the Rizavand living in Qorveh in Kurdistan province continued to speak Southern Kurdish, and their dialect was variously called Chahardawli or Chardawri, after the district of Chardavol where they claimed to originate. They also referred to their dialect as Kolya'i and used it interchangeably with Chardawri, due to its similarities with the Southern Kurdish dialect spoken by the Kolya'i tribe in Kermanshah. The Chardawli Kurdish dialect, which was also close to Laki, was endangered and losing ground to other languages, especially Azerbaijani.

Kamil Ahmadi, who also encountered the tribe during his arrest in Iran, claimed that they were initially open to Kurdish nationalism and even had conflicts with neighboring Turkic groups, although during the 1979 Kurdish rebellion in Iran after the Islamic revolution, they became disgruntled with Kurdish groups, chiefly the KDPI, which was accused of ignoring and neglecting Shia Kurds, including the tribe, which led to the tribe assisting the IRGC during the conflict against KDPI.
