= Kalhor =

Kalhor (Kurdish: Kelhûr, Persian: کلهر), also spelled as Kalhur, may refer to the following:

- Kalhor (tribe), a Kurdish tribe in Kermanshah Province
- Kalhor, Ardabil, a village in Ardabil Province, Iran
- Kalhor, East Azerbaijan, a village in East Azerbaijan Province, Iran
- Kalhur, East Azerbaijan, a village in East Azerbaijan Province, Iran
- Kalhor, Fars, a village in Fars Province, Iran
- Kayhan Kalhor (1963- ), a Kurdish (from Iran) kamancheh player
- Mirza Mohammad Reza Kalhor (1245 - 1310 AH. / 1829 - 1892 AD), a 19th-century Iranian calligrapher of Kurdish origin
