= Kordali (tribe) =

Kurdish tribe native to Iran and Iraq

The Kordali, (Kurdish: کوردەلی, Kurdelî; Persian: کردلی) also known as Kord, (Persian: کرد; Kurdish: کورد, Kurd) or Abdanani, (Persian: آبدانانی; Kurdish: ئاودانانی, Awdananî) are a Kurdish tribe living mainly in western Iran and eastern Iraq. They speak the Kordali dialect of Southern Kurdish and are mostly Shia Muslims.

== History ==
There were several theories about the origin of the name of the Kordali tribe, with some suggesting that Kordali was short for "Kurd-e Feyli", and others suggesting that it meant "Kurds of Ali" due to their Shia faith. The term Kordali was historically applied to other Shia Kurdish tribes such as the Suramiri.

Historically, the southern parts of Posht-e-Kuh were known as the "Kord belt" and included the Kord tribal confederation, comprising the tribes of Kordali, Dinarvand, and Kayidkhurda, all of which were collectively called "Kord-Ali-Khani". The Kordali tribe was one of the main Feyli Kurdish tribes. It was regarded as one of the original Kurdish tribes and the only tribe in all of Kurdistan to simply be called "Kurd".

In Iran, the tribe mainly lived in the southern parts of Ilam province, around Abdanan and Dehloran. It was among the main tribes of Ilam. In Iraq, the tribe lived in Ali al-Gharbi in Maysan as well as Sheikh Saad in Wasit. There were historically some tribes in Turkish Kurdistan and Syrian Kurdistan with the same name, although their relation to the Kordali was never confirmed.

The tribe speaks the Kordali dialect, which was also called Abdanani, Pahla'ei, or Poshtekuhi. It was considered a dialect of Southern Kurdish, or a dialect of the Feyli/Ilami dialect group of Southern Kurdish. Some of the Kordali tribe which lived in Ali al-Gharbi were known as Jaderi and spoke Arabic due to living near Arabs.

Iraj Afshar Sistani added that the Kordali included the Jayervand, a local Kurdish tribe comprising the clans of Shahriarvand, Pirani, Hazrat Reza, Baluyi, Isavand, Mozaffarvand, Gorki, Sadat-e Seyyed Ibrahim, Bazgir, Sadat-e Seyyed Ibrahim Qattal, and Ahmadjashani, among others. He also included the Mamasivand, comprising the clans of Qotbuddin, Mimayi, Golgoli, Mamus Maziya, Mamus Divena, Nawruzvand, Sadat-e Seyyed Fakhroddin, Baramasi, and Bapirvand, among others. He added the tribe of Kol-e Kuh, comprising the Maspi, Zargush, Nasir Ali, and Dashti (Qaytoli). Among the Kordali he also mentioned the tribes of Kayidkhurda, Dinarvand, and Dostalivand (including Moradkhani, Tahmasbi, and Soleymani). Others claimed that the tribe was known as the Kord tribe, and under the Vali dynasty, they were part of the tribal confederation known as Kordali, along with the local tribes of Dinarvand, Kayidkhurda, Shuhan, and many others. The tribe lived mainly around Abdanan, Dehloran, Mehran, Mandali, Badra, Zorbatiya, Jassan, Ali al-Gharbi, Kut, and Amarah, and was divided into two main clans, the Kol-e Kuh in the mountains and the Kol-e Pa in the lowlands, with the Kol-e Kuh mainly comprising the Zargush, Maspi, Mimayi, Mamus, and Bazgir, in addition to the tribe of Sayfi. Others divided the tribe among four groups, the Jayervand, Mamiyavand, the connected tribes, and the independent tribes.

Most historical interactions of the Kord tribe were with the nearby tribes of Kayidkhurda and Dinarvand. The Kord and Kayidkhurda were one unit in the army of the Vali dynasty. In 1928, when the Iranian government under Reza Shah was ready to take Posht-e-Kuh after Gholamreza Khan the Vali had fled, although they initially struggled due to bad weather and little familiarity with the geography, causing Ahmad Amir-Ahmadi to seek help from the Kord tribe.
