= Haifa Zangana =

Iraqi writer, painter and political activist

Haifa Zangana (born 1950 in Baghdad, Iraq) is an Iraqi writer, painter, and political activist, known for her novel Women on a Journey: Between Baghdad and London about political repression, violence and exile. She has written both novels and short stories as well as nonfiction, mainly about current political events relating to Iraq, Palestine or Tunisia.

== Life and career ==
Haifa Zangana was born in Baghdad to a Kurdish father from the northern city of Kirkuk and an Arabic mother from Karbala. Her family home was always full of relatives from the northern cities. She was seven, when the Iraq Revolution of 1958 resulted in the country gaining independence. She was a teenager, when the Ba'ath Party assumed power.

In the 1960s, she was part of a protest rally to release the Algerian political prisoner, Djamila Bouhired. As a young Iraqi growing up in an environment of political upheavals, she noted that:

"The woman freedom fighter looms large in the Arab world. For us teenagers, it was Jamilah, not a pop-singer nor a super model that served as a role model"

In the early 1970s, as a young activist in the Iraqi Communist Party, Haifa was imprisoned by the Baath regime at Abu Ghraib prison. She was one of a group of female resisters, who were imprisoned for distributing leaflets at their university and for attending political meetings. They were captured and tortured and forced to sign confessions, but Zangana managed to escape execution because of intervention by her relative Sabah Mirza, Saddam's bodyguard chief. When she was released from prison, she stayed in Iraq to continue her studies.

She graduated from Baghdad University and its School of Pharmacy in 1974. After graduating, she was appointed to manage the Red Crescent's nascent pharmaceutical unit in Dummar, near Damascus, Syria. This was a challenging role due to lack of funds and her work required frequent movements between Syria and Lebanon.

She left Iraq for political reasons, first moving to Syria, where she continued to work for the Palestinian Red Crescent. She eventually relocated to Britain in 1976 and settled there.

== Artistic career and activism ==
As a painter and writer, she participated in the eighties in various European and American publications and group exhibitions, with one-woman shows in London and Iceland. She is also a commentator for The Guardian, and a contributor to other European and Arabic publications, such as Red pepper, Al Ahram weekly and Al Quds (weekly comment). She is a founding member of the International Association of Contemporary Iraqi Studies and a member of the advisory board of the BRussel's Tribunal on Iraq. She was an advisor for the UNDP Report "Towards the Rise of Women in the Arab World" (2005). Further, she worked as consultant for ESCWA (United Nations Economic and Social Commission for Western Asia). She contributed to the "Arab Integration" report and the "Towards Justice in the Arab world" report, which was withdrawn by the UN secretary-general.

In her 2005 article on the political situation in Iraq, she strongly criticized the preparations for a new constitution as "aimed at legitimising the occupation" and commented on the situation of Iraqi women, who "were long the most liberated in the Middle East."

Zangana has consistently drawn on her experience of living in exile to inform her artwork and writing. She has also been active in helping other women to write about their lives, as in the case of Palestinian ex-prisoners. Her work with women, who were formerly political prisoners in Tunisia, focuses on helping them to write their own experiences as part of a transitional justice process.

== Works ==
Books

- Packaged Lives: Ten Stories and a Novella (2021)
- Party for Thaera: Palestinian women writing life [in Arabic] (2017)
- Iraqi Women Hair Braids, co-authored with D.U, Dar Fadhaat, (Amman, 2013)
- Arab Women Political Participation, (Arab Unity Studies Centre, Beirut, 2012)
- The Torturer in the Mirror, co authored with Ramsey Clark, Thomas Ehrlich Reifer, Seven Stories, NY, 2010
- Dreaming of Baghdad (2009)
- City of Widows: An Iraqi Woman's Account of War and Resistance (2008), Seven Stories Press
- Women on a Journey: Between Baghdad and London (2007)
- Keys to a City (2000)
- The Presence of Others (1999)
- Beyond What the Eye Sees (1997)
- Through the Vast Halls of Memory (1991)

Contributions to books

- "The developing role of colonial feminists in Iraq", in: Arab Feminism, Jean Makdisi, Noha Bayoumi & Rafif Sidawi (eds), I.B.Tauris, 2014
- "Iraq", in: Dispatches from the Arab Spring, Paul Amar & Vijay Prashad (eds), University of Minnesota Press, 2013
- "Women and learning in the Iraqi War Zone", in: Women, War, Violence and Learning, Shahrazad Mojab (ed.), Routledge, 2010.
- "Abu Ghraib: Prison as a Collective Memory" in: Contested Spaces, ed Louise Purbrick, Palgrave, 2007.
- "Song of Resistance" in:War with No End, STW & Verso 2007.
- "Behind the mask" in: “Dr Rice in the house”, ed Amy Scholder, Seven Stories, 2007.
- "Democracy Strangled at Birth", in: “Asking we walk”, ed Corinne Kumar, Streelekha, 2007.
- “The three Cyclops of Empire: Targeting the Fabric of Iraqi Society”, in: Empire’s Law, Pluto, Feb 2006
- “Colonial Feminist: From Washington to Baghdad”, in: Barriers to Reconciliation, Washington University Press, 2006.
- "The Right to Rule Ourselves", in: Not One More Death, [ A collection of writings against the Iraq war/ occupation], STW and Verso- March 2006.

== See also ==
- Culture of Iraq
- Iraqi art
- Arabic literature
- List of Iraqi artists
