= Mandali District =

Mandali
- District
- Location within Iraq
- Coordinates: 33°44′N 45°33′E
- Country: Iraq
- Governorate: Diyala
- Elevation: 341 ft (104 m)

Population (2019)
  - Total: 47,796
- Time zone: UTC+3

Mandali (Arabic: مندلي , Kurdish: مەندەلی, romanized: Mendelî , Turkish: Mandali) is one of the disputed areas between Baghdad and Erbil and belongs to Diyala Governorate administratively. It is 93 km away from the city of Baqubah, the center of Diyala Governorate. It is inhabited by a mixture of Arabs, Kurds and Turkmen.

Mandali borders Khanaqin district from the north, and lies on the border strip with Iran from the east, and Qazaniyah district, the center of Baladruz district, from the west.

In 1987 Mandali was a district, and Baladruz and Qazaniya sub-districts belonged to mandali district, then Baladruz was transformed into a district and Mandali became a Subdistrict of it till recently when it gained district status.

== History ==
Mandali district was inhabited by a majority of the Feyli Kurds, who were subjected to a large-scale campaign of displacement, were deprived from their Iraqi citizenship and properties by the Baathist regime in the late 1970s and early 1980s.

The Feyli Kurds were also subjected to deportation, displacement, arrest, and murder during the rule of former President Ahmed Hassan al-Bakr in 1970 and 1975, and, Saddam Hussein's regime in 1980.

Historians believe that the displacement was due to their sectarian and ethnic affiliations, as well as their struggle for autonomy and independence.

In 2010, the Supreme Criminal Court issued its verdict regarding the crimes of displacement, disappearance, and seizure of the rights of the Feyli Kurds, deeming them to be acts of genocide.

On December 8 of the same year, the Iraqi government issued a decision committing to removing the negative effects of targeting the Feyli Kurds, followed by a decision from the Parliament on August 1, 2010, which declared the forced displacement and disappearance of the Feyli Kurds as a crime of genocide.

On 12 March 2023, the district was re-established by the Iraqi government. The ministry of planning said that they aim of this was to restore life to neglected districts. It also argued, that the decision to abolish the district was initially issued to hurt the local Feyli Kurds.

Mohsen Mandalawi, deputy speaker of the Parliament of Iraq and a Feyli Kurd, who is seen as the mastermind behind the re-establishment of the district, nominated Farid Talib Ibrahim, a Feyli Kurdish, for the post of the mayor. This triggered protests from Sunni and Shia Arab tribes from the area, who criticized that Ibrahim, who worked as a lawyer in Baghdad, wasn't established in the community of the city. However, there were no Turkmen or Kurdish tribes present at the tribal meeting that organized the protest.
