= Mandali, Iraq =

Mandali Mendelî, Bendink
- Town
- Location within Iraq Mandali (Iraqi Kurdistan)
- Coordinates: 33°44′N 45°33′E
- Country: Iraq
- Governorate: Diyala
- District: Mandali District
- Elevation: 341 ft (104 m)

Population
  - Total: 29,882−50,000
- Time zone: UTC+3

Mandali (Arabic: مندلي, Kurdish: مەندەلی, romanized: Mendelî) is a town in Balad Ruz District, Diyala Governorate in Iraq, near the Iranian border. The town has a Feyli Kurdish majority, and a significant Arab and Turkmen communities. Mandali is disputed between the federal government of Iraq and Kurdistan Region, and experienced Arabization during the Saddam era.

== History ==
The former name of Mandali was Bendink which was the capital of the Kurdish principality Bani Annaz.

Kurds constituted 50% of the population in 1947 and the majority continued throughout the 1950s. About 4,000 Kurdish families were deported or fled the town after the collapse of the Kurdish movement in 1975. The main Kurdish tribe of Mandali was Qaralusi.

During September 1980 of the Iran–Iraq War, the town and other nearby villages were attacked by Iranian forces. The population of the town was 25,656 in 1977 but decreased to 8,092 in 1987. A republican decree established Baladruz District in 1987 which Mandali was attached to.

In 1987, Mandali district was abolished by the Ba'athist government and the area added to the Balad Ruz District. On 12 March 2023, the district was re-established by the Iraqi government. The ministry of planning said that they aim of this was to restore life to neglected districts. It also argued, that the decision to abolish the district was initially issued to hurt the local Feyli Kurds.

Muhsin Al-Mandalawi, deputy speaker of the Parliament of Iraq at the time and a Feyli Kurd, who is seen as the mastermind behind the re-establishment of the district, nominated Farid Talib Ibrahim, also a Feyli, for the post of the mayor. This triggered protests from Sunni and Shia Arab tribes from the area, who criticized that Ibrahim, who worked as a lawyer in Baghdad, wasn't established in the community of the city. However, there were no Turkmen or Kurdish tribes present at the tribal meeting that organized the protest.

== Cultural and economic significance of date cultivation ==
Mandali is known for its palm tree orchards and dates. There are two traditional date variants from the city, "Black Cloves" and "Golden Black", who have become internationally known for their unique taste. The numerous palm orchards of Mandali are surrounded by historic mud walls, some of which date back 200 years. Besides the harvest of the date cloves, the dried leaves of the palm trees are also used to produce mats, baskets, brooms and components for houses.

The cultivation of date palms has only recently been revived. During the Ba'athist period, the area was hit by war and faced mass displacement, water scarcity, burning of orchards and neglect. This essentially halted the date production for over three decades. In the 2000s the tradition was revived and infused with modern agricultural practices. By 2010, the orchards yielded a 70% increase in date harvest compared to previous years.

== Border trade ==
Being located in the vicinity of the Soumar border marketplace, in the Iranian Kermanshah province, there are commercial exchanges with Iran.

== See also ==
- Sumar
