= Hazara (Kurdish tribe) =

Kurdish tribe in Iran and Iraq

The Hazara (Kurdish: هەزارە, Hezare; Persian: هزاره), also known as Arkawazi-Boli, are a Kurdish tribe living mainly in western Iran, as well as eastern Iraq. Its two main tribes are the Arkawazi and Boli. They speak Southern Kurdish and mostly follow Shia Islam.

== History ==
The name Hazara was historically applied to the Kurdish tribes of Arkawazi and Boli, which were both traditionally centered around the city of Ilam in Iran. The Hazara were a large Kurdish tribe in Ilam province. They spoke Southern Kurdish and followed Shia Islam. The total population of the Hazara tribe, including the Arkawazi and Boli tribes, in Ilam province was estimated at 70,000 in 2022, making it one of the largest tribes of Ilam province. Some believed that the Arkawazi tribe was ethnically connected to the Kurmanji-speaking Kurds and had historically migrated to Ilam province from Van and Diyarbakır. Their dialect had also had considerable similarities with Kurmanji. The Feyli or Ilami group of Southern Kurdish had a dialect named Arkawazi. Fattah classified the Arkawazi dialect as part of the Kalhori group of Southern Kurdish.

The Arkawazi were one of the main tribes of Ilam province. The Boli tribe also lived around Erbil. In addition to the provinces of Ilam, Kermanshah, Kurdistan, and Lorestan in Iran, the Arkawazi tribe was also present in Iraqi Kurdistan and Turkish Kurdistan. A group known as the Chavari, who had Arkawazi origin, lived in Nurabad-e Delfan, and had adopted the local Laki language. The population of the Arkawazi tribe across Iran and Iraq was estimated at over 150,000 in 2022. The Arkawazi tribe was especially concentrated in Ilam province, Eslamabad-e-Gharb, Khanaqin, and Mandali. The Arkawazi tribe consisted of many clans.

The Hazara tribe was traditionally engaged in animal husbandry and agriculture, and some were renowned performers of local Kurdish vocal traditions such as Howreh, with their specific style known as Arkawazi-Cher. The Hazara tribe was historically known for its peacefulness and exceptional hospitality, as well as contributions to art, poetry, and mysticism, as well as ancient rituals and festivals. Gholamreza Khan Arkawazi and Shaka Boli were traditionally seen as the two greatest poets from Ilam, and both belonged to the Hazara tribe. Haji Haji, Haji Tavileh Feyzollahi, and Hajj Hossein Kardoust were also from the Arkawazi tribe. The tribe had relatively good relations with the Vali dynasty when they ruled Posht-e-Kuh. During the Ba'ath period, many of the Hazara and Khezel tribes were deported to Iran together. By the 21st century, while considered a Kurdish and Shia tribe, it was not included among the Feyli tribes.

The Arkawazi tribe consisted of the clans of Mal-Shewani, Qura-Shewani, Kara-Shewani, Mir, Bawasiya, Qaytoli, Mumai, Girdal, Bey, Miyasim, Bawa, Muret, and Asingar. Iraj Afshar Sistani listed the Arkavazi clans as Qorushvand, Qaytoli, Kareshvand, Mir, Bey, Meysam, Muma, Muret, Kurdil, and Melkashvand.

== See also ==
- Feyli
- Kalhor
- Kurdish tribes
