= Sultanum Begum =

Queen consort of the Safavid Empire (c.1516-1593)

- Mahd-e Olyā
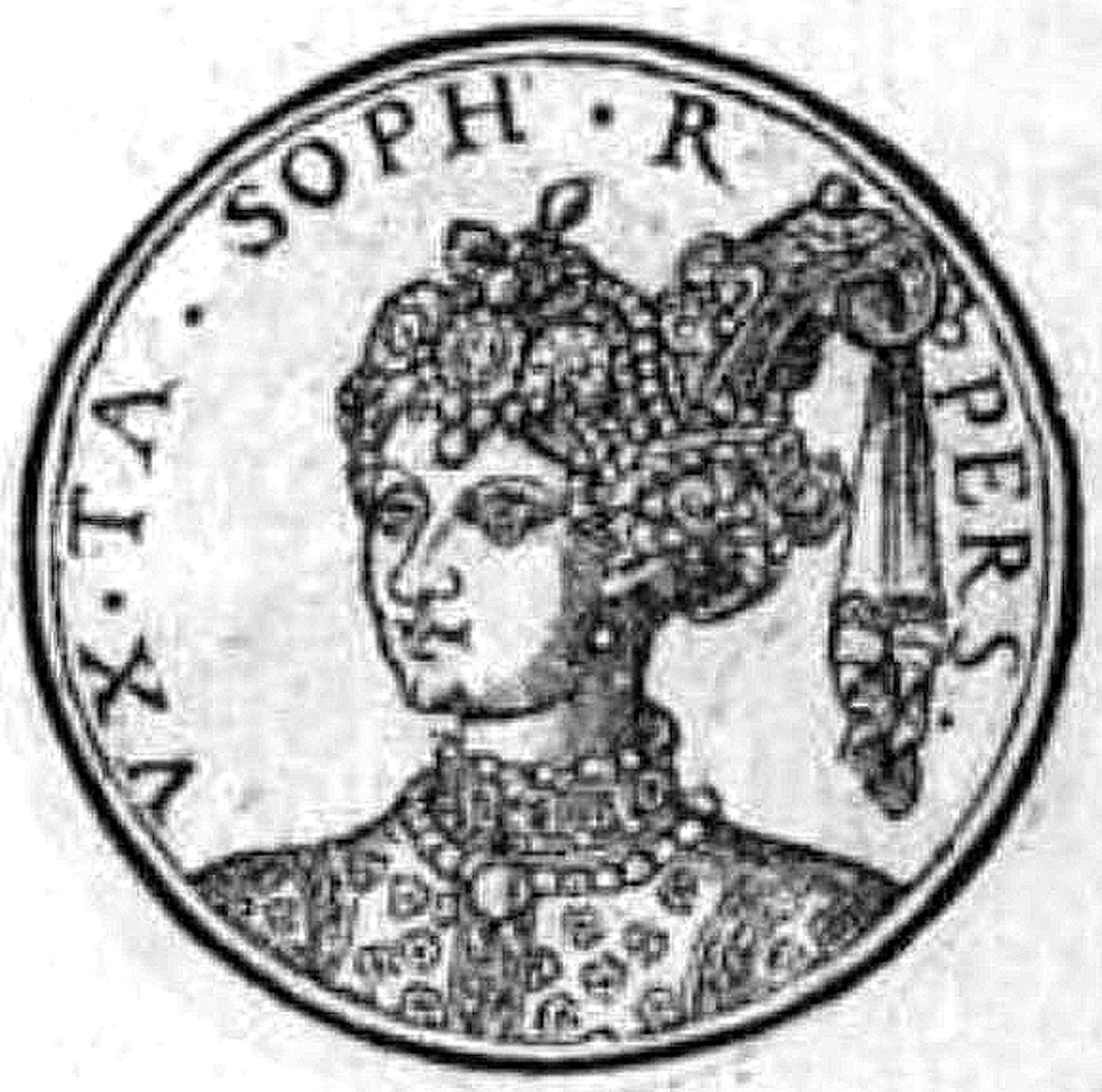
- Queen of Tahmasp I. Promptuarii Iconum Insigniorum (1553)

Chief consort of the Safavid Iran
- Tenure: 23 May 1524 – 25 May 1576

Queen mother of Safavid Iran
- Tenure: 25 May 1576– October 1587
- Predecessor: Tajlu Khanum
- Successor: Dilaram Khanum
- Born: c. 1516
- Died: c. 1593 (aged 76–77); Qazvin, Safavid Iran
- Burial: Imam Reza shrine, Mashhad
- Spouse: Tahmasp I
- Issue: Mohammad Khodabanda; Ismail II; Gohar Sultan Begum
Names
- Persian: قدم علی سلطانم بیگم; English: Kadam Ali Soltanum Khanum
- House: Mawsillu (by birth); Safavid (by marriage)
- Father: Isa bey Mawsillu
- Religion: Islam

Sultanum Begum (Persian: سلطانم بیگم; (c. 1516 – 1593), also known as Kadam Ali Soltan Khanum, was the first wife and chief consort of the second Safavid king Tahmasp I. She was the mother of her husband's successor, Ismail II, and the mother of Mohammad Khodabanda, who reigned from 1578 until his overthrow in 1587.

== Life ==
Sultanum Begum was the daughter of Isa Beg Mawsillu. Like Tahmasp's mother Tajlu Khanum, Sultanum belonged to the Turcoman Mawsillu tribe of the Aq Qoyunlu, and was a maternal third cousin of her husband. Musa Soltan, governor of Azerbaijan was his brother. Begum had two children during her marriage.

Sultanum Begum rose to become the leader of the safavid harem after Tajlu Khanum's exile to Shiraz in 1540. She had an independent royal court and her vizier was Khwaja Ibrahim Khalil. She also gained the honorific title of Mahd-i Ulya.

=== Reign of her sons ===
She mainted her strong position during the reign of Ismail II as her tribe, Mawsillu, also supported him. She was alive during her son Mohammad Khodabanda's and grandson Abbas I's reigns.

== Sources ==
- Soudavar, Abolala (1992). Art of the Persian Courts: Selections from the Art and History Trust Collection. New York: Rizzoli. p. 154. ISBN 978-0847816606.
