= Revolt of Zulfiqar Khan =

16th century revolt in Safavid Iran

Date	1528–1529
Location	Baghdad, Arab Iraq
Result	Safavid victory

Belligerents
Safavid Iran; Qizilbash; Mawsillu; Tekelu; Zangana Kurds	Forces of Zulfiqar Khan; Kalhor Kurds

Commanders and leaders
Tahmasp I Ibrahim Khan Mawsillu; Ali Beg Begtashoghli; Ahmad Beg; Sharaf al-Din Ali Tekelu	Zulfiqar Khan Mawsillu

The revolt of Zulfiqar Khan was a pro-Ottoman revolt led by Zulfiqar Khan against the Safavids. Zulfiqar Khan belonged to the Mawsillu tribe and was the Safavid governor of Iranian Kurdistan, but revolted in Baghdad in 1528, capturing the city and killing the governor, his uncle Ibrahim Khan. He then pledged allegiance to the Ottomans, although the Safavids had recaptured Baghdad in 1529 and Zulfiqar Khan was killed. The Safavids lost control of Baghdad again in 1534 to the Ottomans.

== Background ==
Historical sources mentioned the Kurdish tribe of Kalhor during the reign of Shah Tahmasp I and the revolt of Zulfiqar Khan Mawsillu. The sources also indicated that the rulers of the Kalhor tribe at that time resided in Baghdad. The Mawsillu were among the Qizilbash Turkmen tribes living in the region of Diyar Bakr who entered the service of Shah Ismail in 1504. The Safavids often gave administrative and leadership positions to Qizilbash leaders instead of local leaders. Thus, Zulfiqar Khan, the son of Nukhud Sultan, had governed over the Kalhor tribe of Kurds, despite being from the Mawsillu tribe of Turkmens. Other sources referred to Zulfiqar Khan himself as Kurdish. Historical sources generally maintained that he was from the Mawsillu tribe but governed over the Kalhor tribe.

After Shah Ismail was defeated at Chaldiran, the Ottomans conquered Diyar Bakr and Mosul with the help of Sunni Kurdish tribes. Many of the Qizilbash Turkmen then migrated to Safavid territory, continuing a process which had begun with the formation of the Mawsillu, Dulkadir, and Shamlu tribes of the Qizilbash. The Safavids maintained control over Baghdad. The Tekelu tribe were dominant out of the Qizilbash in Baghdad.

== History ==
Ibrahim Khan had assumed governorship of Baghdad in 934 (1527–28), and he was the grandson of Gulabi Beg II ibn Amir Khan, who died in 1528, and was a prominent Mawsillu chief of the late Aq Qoyunlu and early Safavid periods. The Mawsillu tribe married off two of its female members to Shah Ismail and Shah Tahmasp, with the marriages and the Mawsillu governorship over the western confines of the Safavid Empire marking the complete integration of the Mawsillu into the Qizilbash. In 935, Ibrahim Khan was overthrown and killed in a revolt by his nephew Zulfiqar Khan, the governor of Iranian Kurdistan, which was generally known as "Ulka-yi Kalhur" (the Kalhor country) in Safavid historiography. Zulfiqar Khan captured Baghdad around May 1528. He also captured the entirety of Arab Iraq.

As Zulfiqar Khan killed his paternal uncle and many of his cousins, he sent an envoy to the Sublime Porte pledging allegiance to Sultan Suleyman. Shah Tahmasp had defeated the Uzbeks in Khorasan and was returning from battle when he heard of the revolt of Zulfiqar Khan. Shah Tahmasp decided to suppress Zulfiqar Khan, and sent an army to Arab Iraq which recaptured the region with relative ease in 935 as the Ottoman army were preoccupied with the Habsburg army in Europe. Before any confrontation with the Safavids, Zulfiqar Khan was killed by his Mawsillu relatives. Zulfiqar Khan had sent his letter to Sultan Suleyman earlier in summer 1529, while the Safavids recaptured Baghdad by June 1529. Zulfiqar Khan had even read the khutba read in the name of Sultan Suleyman.

In his memoir, Shah Tahmasp wrote that he was heading to Khorasan with an army at the beginning of the "Year of the Rat", 934 (1527–28), to confront the Uzbek invaders, and while at Tehran, news reached him about Zulfiqar Beg, the son of Ali Beg Nukhud Sultan, who was serving as the leader of the Kalhor Kurds. Zulfiqar Beg had attacked his uncle Ibrahim Khan Mawsillu, who was assigned leadership of his father Amir Khan's troops, and was Safavid governor of Baghdad and Arab Iraq. Zulfiqar Khan killed his uncle and most of his cousins, most notably Merjumek Sultan, son of Ibrahim Khan, and became governor of Arab Iraq. Shah Tahmasp chose to remain focused on the Uzbeks. Shah Tahmasp wrote in his memoir that at an auspicious hour of the "Year of the Ox", 935 (1528–29), he was leading his army to Baghdad from Qazvin when Ali Beg Begtashoghli and his brother Ahmad Beg, the grandsons of Sufi Khalil Mawsillu, overcame Zulfiqar Beg and killed him. They brought his head to Shah Tahmasp on June 10, 1529. Shah Tahmasp appointed Muhammad Sultan Sharaf al-Din Ali Tekellu as the governor of Baghdad. Although the Safavids recaptured Baghdad, the fighting had given the Uzbeks a chance to recover, and they raided Khorasan again later in 1529.

The Kurdish tribe of Zangana helped the Safavids recapture Baghdad after the revolt of Zulfiqar Khan and the Kalhor. At the same time, the Kalhor tribe lost favor with the Safavid government due to the revolts, in addition to being weakened after internal conflict, and the Zangana tribe, with the support of the government, had replaced the Kalhor as the most powerful Kurdish tribe in Kermanshah by the time Shah Abbas I was in power. Although Safavid authority was temporarily shaken by the revolt of Zulfiqar Khan, the Safavids maintained control over Baghdad until 1534 when the Ottomans captured it.

Iskandar Beg Munshi mentioned the revolt of Zulfiqar Khan and the Kalhor tribe. The poet Fuzuli also mentioned it. Nevertheless, Safavid chronicles generally did not give clear or detailed explanations of the seemingly minor revolt, instead linking it to the personal goals of Zulfiqar Khan who sought his own independent rule in Arab Iraq during a chaotic period in the Safavid Empire. The Feyli Kurdish community in Iraq was first established by Kurdish tribal fighters who settled in Iraq after the revolt.

== See also ==
- Kalender Çelebi rebellion
