= Jalal Abdul-Rahman =

Iraqi footballer (1944–2026)

Personal information
- Date of birth: 6 May 1944
- Place of birth: Iraq
- Date of death: 29 September 2026 (aged 82)
- Position: Goalkeeper

Senior career*
Years	Team	Apps	(Gls)
1964−1975	Al-Naqil SC		
1975−1980	Al-Zawra'a SC		

International career
1970–1976	Iraq		
- * Club domestic league appearances and goals

Jalal Abdul-Rahman (Arabic: جَلَال عَبْد الرَّحْمٰن; 6 May 1944 – 29 September 2026) was an Iraqi footballer who played as a goalkeeper for Iraq in the 1976 AFC Asian Cup. He played for the national team between 1970 and 1976.

Abdul-Rahman was of Feyli Kurdish origin. He played in the first World Cup qualifiers for Iraq. Abdul-Rahman died on 29 September 2026, at the age of 82.
