= Ghulamrezakhan Arkawazi =

Kurdish poet (1765–1834)

Ghulamrezakhan Arkawazi (Kurdish: غوڵامڕەزاخان ئەرکەوازی; Persian: غلامرضا خان اَرکوازی c. 1765–1834) was a Kurdish poet and ascetic and a prominent literary figure from Pish-e Kuh region near Khorramabad in Iran. He wrote in Southern Kurdish and Gorani.

== Biography ==
Little is known about the life of Arkawazi and the chronology of his literary works. He was born in the village of Ban-e Vizeh near Ilam to a Shia Kurdish family who belonged to the Arkavazi tribe. His family were wealthy and he grew up in the village. His father Hasan Bag was a well-known figure and held the title of Khan. Arkawazi grew up speaking Feyli but also knew Gorani since it was the literary and administrative language of the Pish-e Kuh region. He moved to Najaf for his studies and documents indicate that he was well-versed in contemporary theological and mystical disciplines. He was respected in his home region of Pish-e Kuh and the ruler of the region Hasan Khan described him as "[T]hat lord of poets". However, at the height of his career, Arkawazi was considered an enemy of Hasan Khan. Reasons for this could have been the oppression of Hasan Khan but also because Arkawazi did not accept prizes given by the ruler. Nonetheless, the rivalry worsened and Arkawazi was imprisoned. After years in prison, Arkawazi left for Kerend-e Gharb where he lived in seclusion. When he died around 1834, few people came to his funeral. Arkawazi had a son named Ahmad Khan and known as Kelwelay who died young from a snake bite.

== Poetry ==
Arkawazi wrote in a simple and direct matter. Despite being from an aristocratic background, the poetry of Arkawazi concerned itself more with the lower classes of Kurdish society. For example, he wrote about the well-being but also the misery of the Kurds. Another theme in his writing was mysticism stemming from his ascetic life and nostalgia.

== Literature ==
Works of Arkawazi include:

- Munacatname – a mystical mathnawi in 24 bands and 666 verses
- Baweyal – an elegy written about the death of his son Kelwelay. Baweyal is still popular in Ilam and different versions exist of it.
- Xurbet – a poem he wrote after he settled in Kerend-Gharb
- Zilixam Şûran – lyric verse
- Zilixam Jeçîn – lyric verse

== Bibliography ==
- Dehqan, Mustafa (2009), Arkawāzī and His Baweyaļ: A Feylî Elegiac Verse from Piştiku, vol. 42, Iranian Studies
