= Mawsillu =

Oghuz tribe

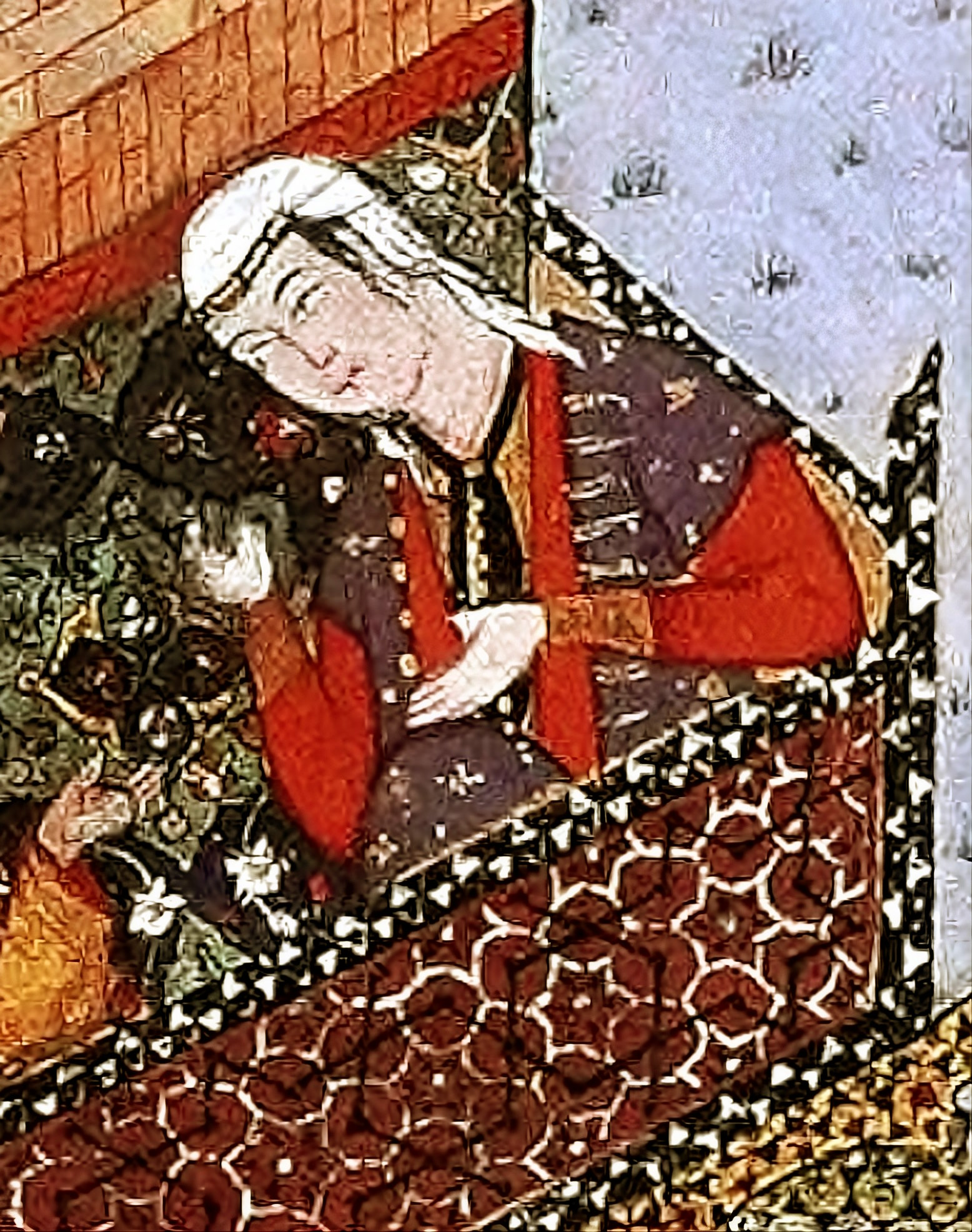
Likely depiction of Tajlu Khanum, member of the Mawsilu Turkoman tribe, first wife of Shah Ismail and Shah Tahmasp's mother. Painted circa 1531.

The Mawsillu (lit. 'from Mosul'; Azerbaijani: Mosullu; Turkish: Musullu) was one of the great Turkmen tribes composing the Aq Qoyunlu confederation. It was one of the most active Turkic tribes that operated during the Aq Qoyunlu and Safavid empires, and one of the Turkmen tribes that formed the Qizilbash. The Mosul tribe, more commonly referred to as Turkmen in the Safavid Empire, originated from the region of Mosul.

== History ==
=== Aq Qoyunlu ===
According to Turkish historian Tufan Gündüz and John E. Woods, they were one of the three biggest tribes dominating Aq Qoyunlu along with the Purnak and Bayandur tribes. Their main controlled areas were near Diyarbakr and Erivan. They supported Hamza beg (a son of Qara Yuluq Osman) and Sheykh Hasan at earliest times but later changed their allegiance to Uzun Hasan after 1451 during Aq Qoyunlu succession crisis. They acquired the city of Ruha in later in 1475 following the defeat of Uways (brother of Uzun Hasan).

After the defeat of Uzun Hasan's brother Üveys in 1475, the city of Urfa was given to the Mosul tribe.

=== Safavid Empire ===
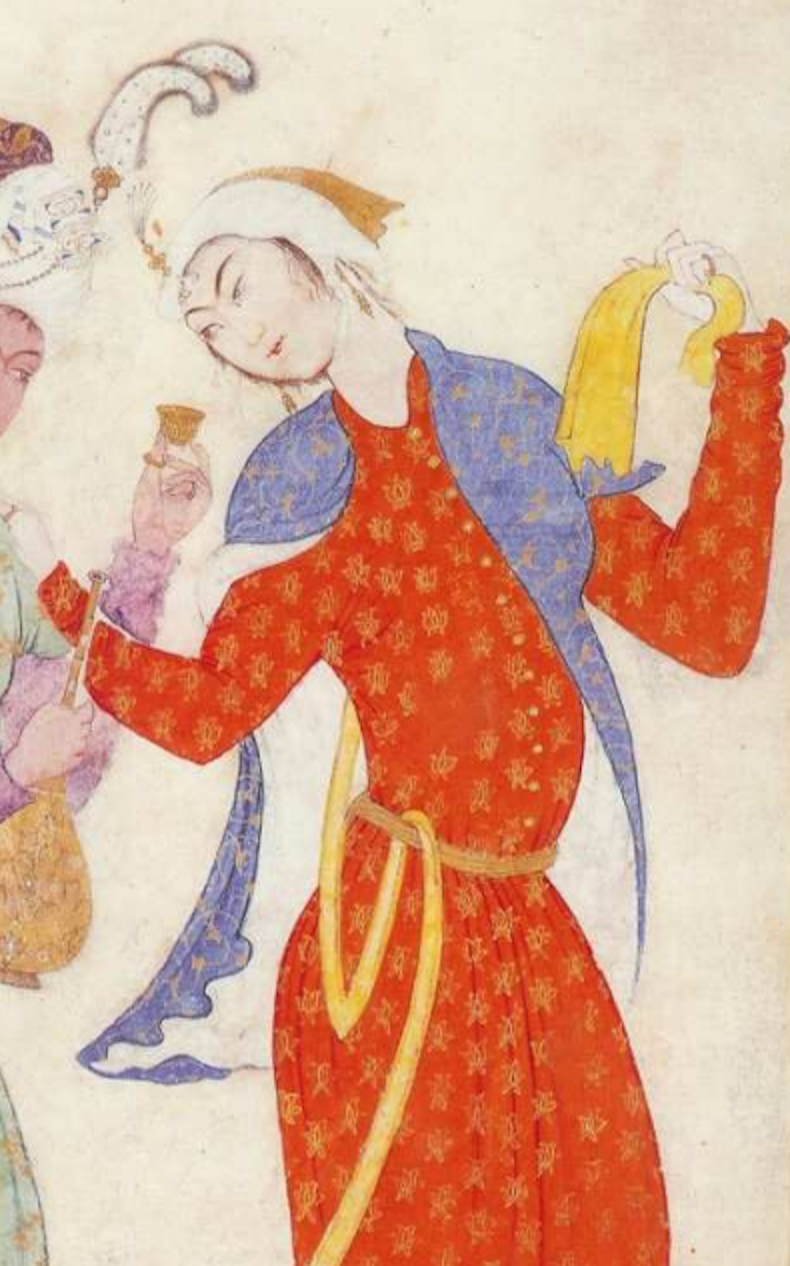
Likely depiction of Mahinbanu Soltanum, daughter of Tajlu Khanum Mawsillu with Shah Ismail. Qazvin, circa 1544.

After the conquests of Ismail I they were important players in the Qizilbash administrative structure with Ismail twice marrying into the tribe and his successor, Shah Tahmasp I being born to a Mawsillu mother.

The Mosul tribe played an important role in the formation of the Safavid Empire. Shah Ismail married twice to women from the Mosul tribe, who held a significant place in the Qizilbash administrative system, and the mother of his successor, Tahmasp I, also belonged to this tribe. Furthermore, Tahmasp I's wife was from this tribe, and his two sons who succeeded him, Ismail II and Muhammad Khudabanda, were born from her. Thus, the paternal grandmother of one of the most powerful rulers of the Safavids, Abbas I, also belonged to this tribe. After Tahmasp I's death, there was turmoil in the Safavid court, and during the struggle for the throne between two princes, Heydar Mirza and Ismail Mirza, Ismail's mother from the Mosul tribe supported Ismail Mirza. Additionally, during the reign of Mohammad Khodabanda, the Mosul-Turkmen tribe rebelled and demanded punishment for the killers of Amir Khan Mosul-Turkmen, especially the Shamlu and Ustajlu chiefs. Hemza Mirza, who effectively ruled the empire at that time, firmly rejected their demands. Initially supported by the Tekelis, the Mosulis initially sought the killing of the Ustajlu and Rumlu chiefs, especially Aliqoli Khan. After Hemza Mirza rejected their demands, they only wanted the exiling of certain individuals to distant places. Their demands were also rejected by the determined crown prince. However, the Mosulis and the Tekelis did not want to fight against him, instead proposing to use their forces against the Ottoman garrison in Tabriz. But this time, representatives of the Qajar, Afshar, and S tribes, who were with Hemza Mirza, expressed their dissatisfaction with the prince's stubborn behavior, claiming that some of his chiefs caused discord among the Qizilbash tribes to protect certain emirs. But Hamza Mirza personally attacked them and killed their leaders. In response, the Mosul-Turkmans and the Tekelis smuggled his 10-year-old brother, Tahmasb Mirza, out of the palace and proclaimed him shah in the capital, Qazvin. Despite being outnumbered, Hamza Mirza defeated them in battle. The leaders of the uprising, Muhammad Khan Turkman and Musayib Khan Tekeli, were captured, while the Vali Khan perished during the battle.

Anvar Chingizoglu writes that with the establishment of the Safavid Empire, the Mosulis, joining forces with the nomads, began to be called Turkmen, and they were included in the list of Qizilbash tribes. However, there have been those who were not included in this list. He states that from the time of Ismail I, Baghdad was governed by these Mosulis or Turkmen nomads, and adds that Ismail I specifically addressed them in his poem:

"As the Arab's settlement diminishes, his dwelling decreases,

In Baghdad, whoever can, the Turkman seizes."

There have also been branches of the Mosul tribe named Bektashi and Gülabil. Chingizoglu mentions that a large branch of the Mosul tribe settled in Mugan and Karabakh and later became known as Tekelis.

== Famous members ==
1. Begtash beg Mawsillu — founder of the clan.
  1. Osman (d. 1436)
  2. Muhammad (d. 1451)
  3. Amir I (d. 1473) — Commander in Chief of Aq Qoyunlu army, governor of Shiraz
    1. Hasan
    2. Gulabi I (d. 1491, killed by Suleyman beg Bijan) — Governor of Erzinjan
      1. Qayitmaz (d. 1507)
      2. Amir II (d. 1522) — Governor of Erzinjan, Guardian of Tahmasp I
        - A daughter — married to Ruzagi family
          1. Sharafkhan Bidlisi
        - Marjumak (d. 1528)
        - Ma'sum (d. 1528)
        - Gulabi II (d. 1528)
      3. Ibrahim (d. 1528) — Governor of Baghdad, killed by Zulfaqar beg
        - Malik Qasim (d. 1529)
          - Muhammadi (foster brother of Tahmasp I)
      4. Ali beg (or Nokhud Sultan)
        1. Zulfaqar (d. 1529) — Captured Baghdad from Ibrahim and submitted to Ottomans, but was on the orders of Tahmasp I
        2. Ali — killed Zulfaqar on the orders of Tahmasp I
      5. Ismail
    3. Fulad
  4. Sufi Khalil (d. 1491, killed by Suleyman beg Bijan)— Governor of Shaki and Shiraz, regent of Baysonqor
    1. Jamshid (d. 1491)
    2. Shaykh Ali (d. 1492)
    3. Ismail (d. 1496)
    4. Yusuf
    5. Begtash
    6. Ya'qub
  5. Nur 'Ali
  6. Pir Umar
  7. Qutb al-Din
  8. Hamza beg
    1. Mihmad beg
      1. Tajlu Khanum — Consort of Ismail I, mother of Tahmasp I
  9. Bakr (d. 1491, killed by Suleyman beg Bijan) — Governor of Astarabad
    1. Isa beg
      1. Musa beg — Governor of Azerbaijan
      2. Sultanum Begum — Consort of Tahmasp I, mother of Mohammad Khodabanda and Ismail II

== See also ==
- Qizilbash

== Sources ==
- Soudavar, Abolala (1992). Art of the Persian Courts: Selections from the Art and History Trust Collection. New York: Rizzoli. p. 154. ISBN 978-0847816606.
