= Musa Soltan Torkaman =

Safavid governor of Azerbaijan

Governor of Azerbaijan
- Tenure: 1531 - 1534
- Predecessor: Ulama soltan Takalu
- Successor: Ulama soltan Takalu
- Noble family: Mawsillu
- Father: Isa Khan Mawsillu

Musa Soltan Torkaman (Persian: موسی سلطان موصلوی ترکمان) was one of the Qizilbash leaders of Mawsillu tribe and Safavid governor of Azerbaijan under Tahmasp I.

== Background ==
His father Isa beg was a son of Bakr beg Mawsillu (d. 1491), a governor of Astarabad and a loyal follower of Ya'qub Beg of Aq Qoyunlu. According to some sources, his daughter Sultanum Begum was married to Tahmasp I c. 1516 and hence was a grandfather of Mohammad Khodabanda and Ismail II. However, according to Kioumars Ghereghlou, he was a brother to Sultanum Begum. He was appointed as governor of Azerbaijan following former governor Ulama soltan Takalu's defection to Ottoman Empire. After 3 years of rule he had to flee from Tabriz following Suleiman the Magnificent's campaign and widespread plague among his troops. He was described as an official given into "mirth, play, conversation and wine".
