= Kalhor (tribe) =

Large Kurdish tribe in Iran and Iraq

The Kalhor (Kurdish: کەڵھوڕ) are a Kurdish tribe native to the southern regions of Kurdistan where they traditionally lived on both sides of the Iran-Iraq border between Kermanshah and Khanaqin. They are mostly Shia Muslims with a Yarsani and Ali-Illahi minority. Their dialect, Kalhori, is a branch of Southern Kurdish.

== Etymology ==
The name of the Kalhor tribe was often said to derive from "Kal" and "Hur", meaning "mountain goat" and "the sun". Vladimir Minorsky also speculated if the name Kalhor came from "kal-xwar", meaning "buffalo-eaters". The Kalhor tribe was sometimes called "Kalkhur". The Guran tribe, neighbors of the Kalhor, referred to the Kalhor as "keł weř", with "keł" meaning a mountain goat, and "weř" being commonly interpreted as "slayer", but also used for "nomad". Killing a mountain goat was seen as a symbol of bravery among the tribes of the region. The Kalhor tribe was known by the Guran and the other Kurdish tribes of the region for its historic dominance over Kermanshah. There was even a village in the Kermanshah region named "Kełkweş", meaning "goat killer". The Kalhor tribe traditionally pronounced its name as "Kełeř", while "Kalhor" was the Persian pronunciation. The "o" sound in Persian was not a native sound in the Kalhori dialect of Southern Kurdish, although some Kalhor began pronouncing the "h" in their name due to Persian influence. It was also suggested that the name Kalhor derived from "Kalgir", roughly meaning someone who conquered or captured a mountain goat. The shift from "g" to "h" was said to have gradually occurred in many Iranic languages. It was generally agreed that "Kal" meant a mountain goat, as it meant the same thing in Kurdish and Persian, while most disagreements were about the meaning of "Hor". Either way, the Kalhor tribe traditionally pronounced its name as "Kełeř" which was generally believed to represent bravery and warrior nature.

== History ==
The Kalhor were one of the oldest Kurdish tribes, if not the oldest. The tribe was native to Kermanshah province in Iran where it was historically the most powerful tribe. In the Sharafnama, Sharafkhan Bidlisi wrote that the Kurdish nation was made up of four subdivisions, the Goran, Kurmanj, Kalhor, and Lur. Sharafkhan Bidlisi also wrote that the Kalhor leaders claimed descent from Gudarz, the father of Giv in the Shahnama.

The Kalhor, as a tribe often mentioned among the Lak tribes, were sometimes mislabeled as Lurs in early foreign works, although scholars later clarified that they were a well known Kurdish tribe and rejected other possible origins. While some Lak tribes were considered Lur, the Kalhor were among those consistently considered as Kurds. Like other Lak tribes, the Kalhor also had a tradition of originating from further north. A historically prominent theory considered the Kalhor as the descendants of the Jews carried into captivity by Nebuchadnezzar.

The Kalhor were historically Yarsani, but increasingly converted to Shia Islam after the 1830s, and were mostly Shia Muslim by the early 1900s. As the Kalhor tribe became major players in Kermanshah at the time of their conversion to Shia Islam at the turn of the century, it was likely that the Kalhor leaders decided that a Shia identity was more politically prudent, like the Ardalan did in the 1820s. It remained one of the largest Kurdish tribes in Iran alongside the neighboring Guran tribe and the Mangur tribe around Mahabad. Some Kalhor remained Yarsani after most of the tribe became Shia Muslim. In the 19th century, the local government cooperated with Shia clergy to promote Shia Islam in Kermanshah province, and especially in Kermanshah city, as part of their organized effort to promote Shia Islam in the region. The process might have been accelerated by the residence of notable cleric families in the city, who were usually invited by governors, and later the establishment of a madrasa under the governorship of Emad al-Dowleh in 1868. The main targets had been the Yarsanis, but also the Jews.

There was a historic bridge named "Pul-i Kalhur" (the Kalhur Bridge) located on the Kashkan river north of the village of Mamulan in Lorestan province, which was located next to inscriptions dedicated to the Kurdish dynasty of the Hasanwayhids. Some had identified it with the modern Pol-e Dokhtar. The Kalhor tribe had a relatively independent status before the rise of the Safavids. When the Safavids came to power, the Kalhor tribe aligned itself with the state and served as defenders of the border against the Ottomans. The Kalhor tribe had maintained its independent local government until the reign of Shah Tahmasp I. However, some Kalhor territory briefly became part of the Ottoman Empire after a treaty with the Safavids. At one point, the province was historically named "Kermanshah and Kalhor" after the tribe. The Kalhor and Pazuki tribes were known for being among the Kurdish tribes allied with the Safavids. Iraj Afshar claimed that Safavid state influence over the Kalhor tribe was initially very limited, and that the tribe was fully autonomous and lived between Mahidasht and Mandali. The Safavid policy of appointing Qizilbash governors over the natives to prevent rebellions had dissatisfied the Kalhor tribe. Sharafkhan Bidlisi claimed that the Safavids divided the Kalhor tribe into three branches, Polangan, Tang-e Zohab, and Mahidasht, and that their division caused the Turkmen Qizilbash elements to dominate. Sharafkhan Bidlisi also claimed that during the reign of Shah Abbas I, the conflict between the Shahbazi and Mansuri clans of the Kalhor tribe had caused it to lose power, with the Zangana tribe emerging as the most powerful Kurdish tribe in the region, establishing authority over the Kalhor tribe. Under Shah Abbas I, the Zangana tribe replaced the Kalhor tribe as the most powerful Kurdish tribe in Kermanshah, and was supported by the government, while the Kalhor tribe was weakened after internal conflict, and had lost favor with the Safavids after occasionally rebelling and siding with the Ottomans, such as the revolt of Zulfiqar Khan against Shah Tahmasp I. Towards the end of the Safavid era, much of the Kalhor territory was taken by the Ottoman Empire before it was restored by Nader Shah. Despite being under Ottoman rule for some time, the Kalhor tribe continued to provide military services to the Safavids. After the fall of the Safavids, the Kalhor tribe gained more autonomy

There was chaos in Iran after the death of Nader Shah Afshar, allowing tribal leaders and commanders to emerge again. The Kalhor tribe was able to regain some of its former prestige. When Karim Khan Zand came to power, due to ethnic and cultural similarities, the Kalhor were among his biggest allies alongside the Zangana tribe. Under Karim Khan Zand, the Kalhor and Zangana tribes captured the Kermanshah fortress, previously occupied by Arab and Turkmen tribes, and Karim Khan Zand gave the authority in the region to the Kurdish tribal leaders. Karim Khan married the daughter of Mohammad Khan Kalhor, known as Qamar Khanom. This political marriage strengthened not only the Kalhor tribe but all Kurdish tribes of Kermanshah. The Kalhor tribe fought against the Ottomans and internal rebels as well during the Zand era. When Agha Mohammad Khan Qajar came to power, Aliqoli Khan Zangana became the governor of Kermanshah. One of the most important events of his rule in Kermanshah was his military confrontation with Khosrow Khan Ardalan. Khosrow Khan defeated him and killed him, and transferred control of Kermanshah to one of the descendants of Haji ‘Ali Khan Zangana. Some Kalhor leaders had supported Khosrow Khan.

In 1830, the Kalhor and Zangana tribes under Muhammad Husayn Mirza Hishmat al-Dawla, the governor of Kermanshah, clashed with the Bakhtiari Lurs under Hisam al-Saltana. Later in 1910, the Kalhor leader Dawud Khan also helped the governor of Kermanshah counter the growing power of the Bakhtiari Lurs to the east and the lawlessness in Luristan to the southwest. In 1923, when Reza Shah saw the difficulty of suppressing the revolt in nearby Lorestan province, he requested help from the Kalhor tribe. The last influential Kalhor leader was Dawud Khan who led the tribe in the early 1900s, starting off as a mere peddler but gradually becoming "the absolute master of the entire territory between Kermanshah and the Ottoman border". Dawud Khan later joined the revolt of Salar al-Dawla and was killed in battle in 1912. His successor, Abbas Khan, was imprisoned by Reza Shah in 1926. He was released in 1941, after Reza Shah was abdicated, and was even elected a deputy in the Parliament from Kermanshah in 1944. However, most of the Kalhor tribe had become sedentary by then and had lost the cohesion that had once made them strong. Despite its large size, the tribe had significantly weakened. However, it was still comparatively rich. In August 1946, the Kalhor tribe, numbering around three million, was nervously forging allegiances with Kurdish tribes to the north and possibly with some of the southern tribes. Amir Maksus, the Kalhor leader, who spent fourteen years in prison under Reza Shah, had persuaded many community leaders in Kermanshah to sign a manifesto for Kurdish independence, although the situation in Iran would stabilize.

The Kalhor tribe was also present in Posht-e-Kuh (around Ilam province) before the Safavids emerged, and had successfully defended their land in Posht-e-Kuh from the Shahsevan during the reign of Shah Abbas I. There was a large Kalhor population in the Eyvan region of Ilam province, which was under the Vali dynasty. The Kalhors of Ilam were known as Eyvan Kalhor, and were considered Feyli Kurds. Although they were Kalhor, their tribal organization was different from the main branch of the Kalhor in Kermanshah. During the rule of the Vali dynasty, the Eyvan Kalhor were constantly in conflict with the Khezel and Arkawazi tribes, and with Valis, over territory and pastures. The Eyvan were traditionally divided into two branches, the Bansiri and Chulak. The Bansiri included the clans of Chashmasefid, Chalahiji, Gavsuvar, Barzuvan, Zulan Sofla, Zulan Olya, Farzaga, Alfuza, Khwabanan, Darga, Kol-Kol, Majin, Helshi, and Korkhorram. The Chulak included the clans of Sartang, Narkasi, Jafta, Kalan, Chehelzahi, Janali, Chulak, Alawiga, Dabiran, Miralam Shah, Zarna, Shalashuri, Taran, Kolajub, Chuvamahi, Vit, Narkhan Sofla, Kapnakiran, Khuran, Ismaili, Shurabe Khurman Babagir, and Miwamana. There were other Kalhor in Ilam who had earlier migrated from Kermanshah. The Kalhor, as well as Eyvan, were among the main tribes of Ilam. The Rizavand, a Kurdish tribe native to the Chardavol region next to Eyvan, were also included among the Kalhor tribes.

The tribe speaks Southern Kurdish, specifically the Kalhori dialect, which stretched from southwestern Kermanshah province to northern Ilam province to eastern Iraq. In Iraq, the Kalhor tribe mainly lived in Khanaqin. Branches of the Kalhor tribe included Khaledi, Shiani, Siasia, Kazemkhani, Khoman, Talesh, Garga, Kolehpa, Kolehjow, Shuwan, Quchemi, Mansuri, Alvandi, Mahidashti, Harunabadi, Shahini, Mushgir, Bodaqbeygi, Zeynalkhani, and Komara.

== See also ==
- Sanjabi
- Zangana
- Feyli Kurds
