= Ban-e Vizeh =

Ban-e Vizeh بان ويزه
- Village
- Location within Iran
- Coordinates: 33°37′48″N 46°11′33″E
- Country: Iran
- Province: Ilam
- County: Ilam
- Bakhsh: Chavar
- Rural District: Arkavazi

Population (2006)
  - Total: 201
- Time zone: UTC+3:30 (IRST)
  - Summer (DST): UTC+4:30 (IRDT)

Ban-e Vizeh (Persian: بان ويزه, also Romanized as Bān-e Vīzeh; also known as Bāndūzeh, Banwīza, and Bon Vaz) is a village in Arkavazi Rural District, Chavar District, Ilam County, Ilam Province, Iran. At the 2006 census, its population was 201, in 49 families. The village is populated by Kurds.

== Notable people ==
- Khulam Rada Khan Arkawazi
