= Kordali language =

One of the Kurdish languages

Kordali
- Il-e Kurd
- Native to: Western Iran
- Region: Kurdistan
- Language family: Indo-European: Indo-Iranian; Iranian; Western; Northwestern; Kurdish; Southern Kurdish; Kordali

Language codes
- ISO 639-3: None (mis)
- Glottolog: kord1245

Kordali (Kurdali), also known as Il-e Kurd and Palai, is one of the Kurdish dialects. It is often counted as a dialect of Southern Kurdish, It is spoken by the large Kordali tribe in the borderlands between Iraq and Iran.

== Geography ==
Kordali is principally spoken in parts of Ilam Province in Iran including in Abdanan, Dehloran, Meymeh and Pahleh. In Iraq, the dialect is spoken in Ali Al-Gharbi in Maysan Governorate and Shayk Sa'd in Wasit Governorate.

== See also ==
- Posht Tang-e Kordali
