= Têgeyştinî Rastî =

Kurdish newspaper

- Issue 1 released in January 1, 1918
- Type: Bi-weekly newspaper
- Owner: British Army
- Founded: 1918
- Ceased publication: 1919
- Political alignment: Military
- Language: Kurdish
- Headquarters: Baghdad, Iraq

Têgeyştinî Rastî or Understanding the truth was a Kurdish language semiweekly newspaper published by the British Army in Iraq. It was the first Kurdish Nationalist newspaper focusing on Kurdish history, language, poetry and culture.

== History ==
Têgeyştinî Rastî was founded by the British Army in January 1918 during the First World War in which Britain was fighting the Ottoman Empire. It was propaganda newspaper which highlighted and compared British rule to the Ottoman rule and that Kurdish language, culture and religion were better off under the British and to incite Kurds living under Ottoman Rule. The newspaper was published from 1918 to 1919 in which 66 issues were published. The name of the Editor was not published in the newspaper but it known to be Major Soane a British officer with knowledge in the Kurdish language and assisted by a Kurdish Poet Shukri Fadhli.
