= Sabah Mirza Mahmoud =

Iraqi Colonel

Sabah Mirza Mahmud (Arabic: صباح ميرزا محمود, 1943–2005) was an Iraqi military colonel and the first personal companion of former Iraqi president Saddam Hussein. He was of Feyli Kurdish origin and followed Shia Islam.

== Early life ==
Sabah was one of Saddam's old friends, and began his violent partisan duties since the age of 16. In his youth, he was known in his neighborhood (Adhamiyah) as a boxer. When he was a student, he joined General Union Students in the Republic of Iraq, Sabah graduated from Languages Institute, though he stayed unemployed for some time until Saddam recruited him as his bodyguard.

== Career ==
=== Service under Saddam Hussein ===
His Code Name was Lieutenant Yusif. In preparation for the coup of 17 July Revolution 1968 Sabah was assigned to lead one of the groups that were deployed to patrol some streets of Baghdad. He served Saddam as his bodyguard for over 22 years. He received quick military promotions through the ranks due to his closeness to Saddam Hussein. During the Iran–Iraq War, Sabah attended night shifts at the headquarters of Central Command, where Saddam used to attend one hour a day to be briefed on the military operations. According to files from the former Iraqi regime, resentment had developed among some of Saddam Hussein’s bodyguards toward Sabah Mirza Mahmoud, who was the only officer among the original group of 16 guards. Hussein Kamel, Abdul Hamoud, and Arshad Yassin reportedly objected to being commanded by a Kurdish officer, they privately discussed opposing him. Sabah also came under scrutiny after he was heard speaking Kurdish with a businessman in Sulaymaniyah, leading Saddam to have his home telephones monitored for three months, no evidence of wrongdoing was found and the surveillance was stopped. Sabah was ultimately removed from his position following an incident involving Rashidi Abu Hamra, who had been sentenced to ten years in prison for defrauding the Rafidain Bank. Sabah claimed that Saddam had ordered Abu Hamra’s release, although no such order had been given. After learning of this, Saddam had Sabah detained for three days before ordering his retirement, removal from the Ba’ath Party, and dismissal as head of the bodyguard unit.

=== U.S invasion ===
Sabah was captured in 2003 by American occupying forces to be questioned about Saddam's hiding place, and he was soon released as there was no evidence of his knowledge thereof, but a weapons cache was seized from his farm.

=== Sport ===
He was elected as vice chairman of National Olympic Committee of Iraq, he was also appointed as Chairman of the Iraqi Football Association to assert the new regime authority over the nation's favorite's sport, at the time when Iraqi Team became one of the most successful national teams in Asia, he also was appointed as the president of Al-Shabab sport club. ٍ

=== Farming ===
Sabah had a 10-Dunam farm in Jurf Al Naddaf area southeast of Baghdad, which he claimed that it was an unproductive vacant land, and he restored it and thereafter owned it officially.
