= Alfons Gabriel =

- Born: 1894; Austria
- Died: 1976 (aged 81–82)
- Occupations: Geographer, travel writer, author, explorer

Alfons Gabriel (1894–1976) was an Austrian geographer, explorer and travel writer who made several trips to the deserts of Iran, in 1927, 1928, 1933, and 1937.

Gabriel wrote five books about his trips and findings. His book Durch Persiens Wüsten (1935) is translated into Persian.

== Bibliography ==
- Im weltfernen Orient, Munich and Berlin, 1929.
- Durch Persiens Wüsten, Stuttgart, 1935.
- Aus dem Einsamkeiten Irans, Stuttgart, 1939.
- Weites, wildes Iran. Drei Jahre Forschungsfahrten in Wüsten und Steppen. 3d edition, Stuttgart, 1942.
- Fremde Meere, Dschungeln und Wüsten. Vienna, Universum, 1948
- Die Erforschung Persiens, Vienna, 1952
