= Kalhor, Fars =

Kalhor كلهر
- Village
- Location within Iran
- Coordinates: 30°17′23″N 53°23′47″E
- Country: Iran
- Province: Fars
- County: Bavanat
- Bakhsh: Sarchehan
- Rural District: Bagh Safa

Population (2006)
  - Total: 73
- Time zone: UTC+3:30 (IRST)
  - Summer (DST): UTC+4:30 (IRDT)

Kalhor (Persian: كلهر; also known as Kalhūr) is a village in Bagh Safa Rural District, Sarchehan District, Bavanat County, Fars province, Iran. At the 2006 census, its population was 73, in 15 families.
