= Khezel (tribe) =

Kurdish tribe in Iran and Iraq

The Khezel are a Kurdish tribe living mainly in western Iran and eastern Iraq. They speak the Khezel dialect of Southern Kurdish and are mostly Shia Muslims.

== History ==
Some derived the name Khezel from the Islamic figure Khidr. Others claimed the Khezel descended from the Arab tribe of Khaz'al and settled in Nahavand after the Islamic conquest and later migrated to Shirvan-Chardavol. There were other claims that the Khezel descended from Rostam or Abbas ibn Ali. The Arab theory was commonly rejected with some adding that the name of the Khezel tribe was not to be confused with the Arab tribe in Iraq known as Khaza'il. The Khezel were considered a Kurdish tribe which had a long presence in Ilam. Throughout the Safavid and Qajar periods, many of the Khezel dispersed from their traditional land to regions such as Shahin Dezh, Nahavand, Qorveh, Gilan-e Gharb, Kangavar, Bisotun, Khanaqin, Mandali, and Zorbatiya. During the Zand and Qajar periods, some Khezel migrated to Luristan, Chaharmahal and Bakhtiari, Fars, and Mazandaran. A large part of the Khezel lived in Shirvan and Chardavol in Ilam. During the Pahlavi period, the Khezel began to settle. They were considered one of the main Feyli Kurdish tribes. They were also one of the main tribes of Ilam. The Khezel dialect was generally considered part of the Feyli or Ilami group of Southern Kurdish along with the dialects of Ilami, Malekshahi, Badrayi, and Abdanani. Fattah considered the Khezel dialect spoken in the northern parts of Shirvan and Chardavol a variety of Laki. The Khezel dialect had many similarities with the Kalhori dialect of Southern Kurdish but also some differences. The Khezel tribe mainly comprised the tribes of Shamsinvand, Khazarvand, Morshedvand, and Qolivand. Others added the Khiravand and Jabarqolivand (Javarvand, Javayervand) among the Khezel. Others listed the Khezel tribes as Shamsivand, Chardavol, Holeylan, Morshedvand, Qolivand, and Khezelvand.
