= Shuhan (tribe) =

Kurdish tribe in Iran and Iraq

The Shuhan (Kurdish: شووهان, Şûhan; Persian: شوهان), also known as Shwan (Kurdish: شوان, Şiwan), are a Kurdish tribe living mainly in Iran and Iraq. The Shuhan speak Kurdish and mostly follow Shia Islam.

== History ==
The name of the tribe was pronounced Shuhan as well as Shwan. The Shuhan was among the main tribes of Ilam province. The Shuhan also lived around Kirkuk in Iraq. Ali-Akbar Dehkhoda mentioned the Shuhan as "one of the tribes of Posht-e Kuh of the Kurdish tribes of Iran." Ely Banister Soane referred to the Shuhan in Kirkuk as pure Kurds, speaking Southern Kurmanji, and being Shafi'i Sunnis, also allied in origin with the Hamawand. The tribe was divided into nine clans including 21 clans within them. They were traditionally centered around Zarrinabad between Karkheh and Abdanan. Iraj Afshar Sistani listed the tribes of the Shuhan as the Safarkali, Buluch, Sharaf, Qaytol (including Mohsen and Abdollahvand), Kaveri (including Qoli, Ale-Busafari, Sida, Karambawa, and Kolli), Falak (including Khalifa and Qadirvand), Kalayvand (including Barkhordar, Marghazar, Kurkur, Sozi, Gholam, Shamin, and Zolfaqar), and Karambawa (including Varna-Ziyar). Minorsky mentioned that the "Kurdishuhan" living in the south of Posht-e-Kuh spoke a dialect of Kurmanji Kurdish.
