= Ely Bannister Soane =

British political officer in Kurdistan

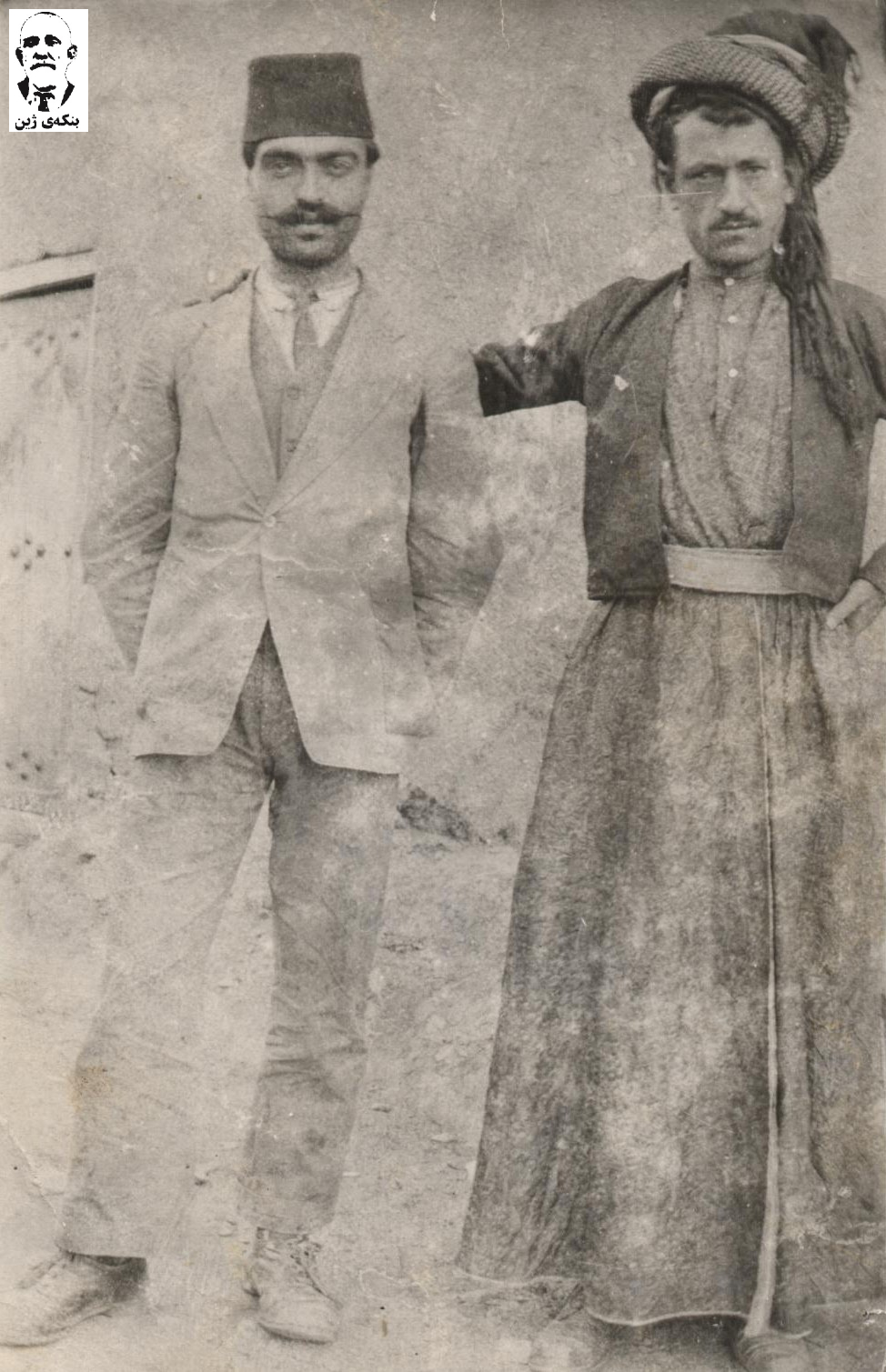
Soane (left) in 1909, alongside a Kurdish leader Abdullah Ziraki Khayat

Ely Bannister Soane (1881–1923) was a British major, linguist, intelligence agent and writer who is best known for his travels around Kurdistan and Mesopotamia and works on Kurds.

== Life ==
Soane was born in 1881 in Kensington and went to Latymer Lower School and then Latymer Upper School which he graduated from in 1898. He then worked at the Imperial Bank of Persia for a year and was afterwards sent to Persia where he travelled around Teheran, Shiraz, Bushehr and Yazd, where he learned the local languages and converted to Islam. In 1906, he started working for the Imperial Bank of Persia in Kermanshah until he returned to England in 1907. He then made a trip to Kurdistan and Mesopotamia in disguise as Mirza Gulam Hüseyin Şirazî and wrote his book "To Mesopotamia and Kurdistan in disguise" containing his experiences during his travels which was published in 1910.

From 1909 to 1913 he worked for Anglo-Persian Oil Company and lived in Baghdad when World War I began. After being put in jail for a short period, he began working for the British in secret missions.

For a period before he was appointed Vice-consul to Dezful in Iran in 1916, he also edited the Basrah Times, a daily newsheet sponsored by the Chief Political Officer in the British administration in Mesopotamia (Sir Percy Cox) for sale to the troops and local population in the British occupied zone.

He became an advisor for the Kingdom of Kurdistan in 1919 after British influence in the region increased as the result of the Ottoman defeat in the war, but he would return to England in 1923 after the Cairo Conference.

While in Kurdistan as the British representative, tensions arose between him and the local ruler Mahmud Barzanji. Soane knew Kurdish and was the editor of the Têgeyştinî Rastî newspaper which promoted Kurdish nationalism and culture.

== Works ==
- Soane, E. B. (1909), "Notes on Kurdish dialects: The Shadi branch of Kermanji", The Journal of the Royal Asiatic Society of Great Britain and Ireland, New Delhi: Cambridge University Press: 895–921
- Soane, E. B. (1909), "A Southern Kurdish Folksong in Kermanshahi Dialect", The Journal of the Royal Asiatic Society of Great Britain and Ireland, Cambridge University Press: 35–51
- Soane, E. B. (1910). To Mesopotamia and Kurdistan in disguise : with historical notices of the Kurdish tribes and Chaldeans of Kurdistan. Maynard and Company.
- Soane, E. B. (1910), Report on the Sulaimania district of Kurdistan, Calcutta: Superintendent Government
- Soane, E. B. (1913). Grammar of the Kurmanji or Kurdish language (in English and Kurdish). Luzac & Company.
- Soane, E. B. (1918), Notes on the tribes of Southern Kurdistan, Government Press, pp. 1–39
- Soane, E. B. (1921), "A Short Anthology of Guran Poetry", The Journal of the Royal Asiatic Society of Great Britain and Ireland, Cambridge University Press: 57–81
- Soane, E. B. (1922), "Notes on the Phonology of Southern Kurmanji", The Journal of the Royal Asiatic Society of Great Britain and Ireland, Cambridge University Press: 191–226
- Soane, E. B.; Vladimir, Minorsky (1923). "The Tale of Suto and Tato: Kurdish Text with Translation and Notes". Bulletin of the School of Oriental Studies. 3. Cambridge University Press: 69–106. doi:10.1017/S0041977X00000069. S2CID 162669858.
