= Balad Ruz District =

Baladrooz District Arabic: قضاء بلدروز
- District
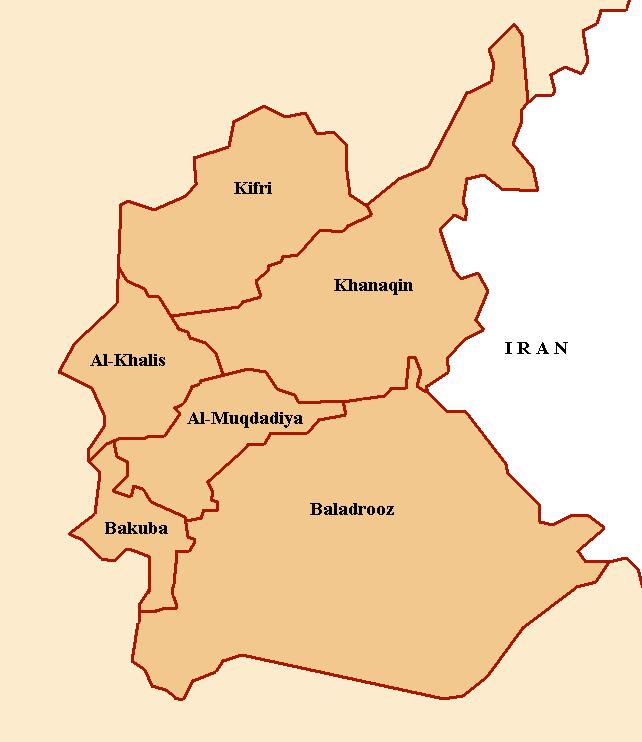
- Districts of Diyala Governorate
- Interactive map of Baladrooz District
- Country: Iraq
- Governorate: Diyala Governorate

Area
  - Total: 6,280 km^{2} (2,420 sq mi)

Population (2024)
  - Total: 117,497
- Time zone: UTC+3 (AST)

Balad Ruz District (Arabic: قضاء بلدروز) is a district of Diyala Governorate, Iraq. Cities and villages include Balad Ruz, Turki Village, Fatamia, Kurkush, and Taweela. It is a district in Diyala Governorate, the vast majority of its residents are Sunni Arabs.
