= Southern Kurdish =

Variety of Kurdish

- Xwarîn
- کوردی خوارین
- Native to: Iran, Iraq
- Region: Kurdistan
- Ethnicity: Kurds
- Native speakers: (6 million cited 2000–2023)
- Language family: Indo-European: Indo-Iranian; Iranian; Western; Northwestern; Kurdish; Southern Kurdish
- Dialects: Feylî; Kelhurrî; Lekî; Xaneqînî; Gerrûsî (Bîcarî); Kirmaşanî; Kolyai; Sanjâbî; Melikşayî; Bayray; Kordalî; Korouni
- Writing system: Kurdish alphabet (Perso-Arabic script)

Language codes
- ISO 639-3: sdh
- Glottolog: sout2640
- Linguasphere: 58-AAA-c
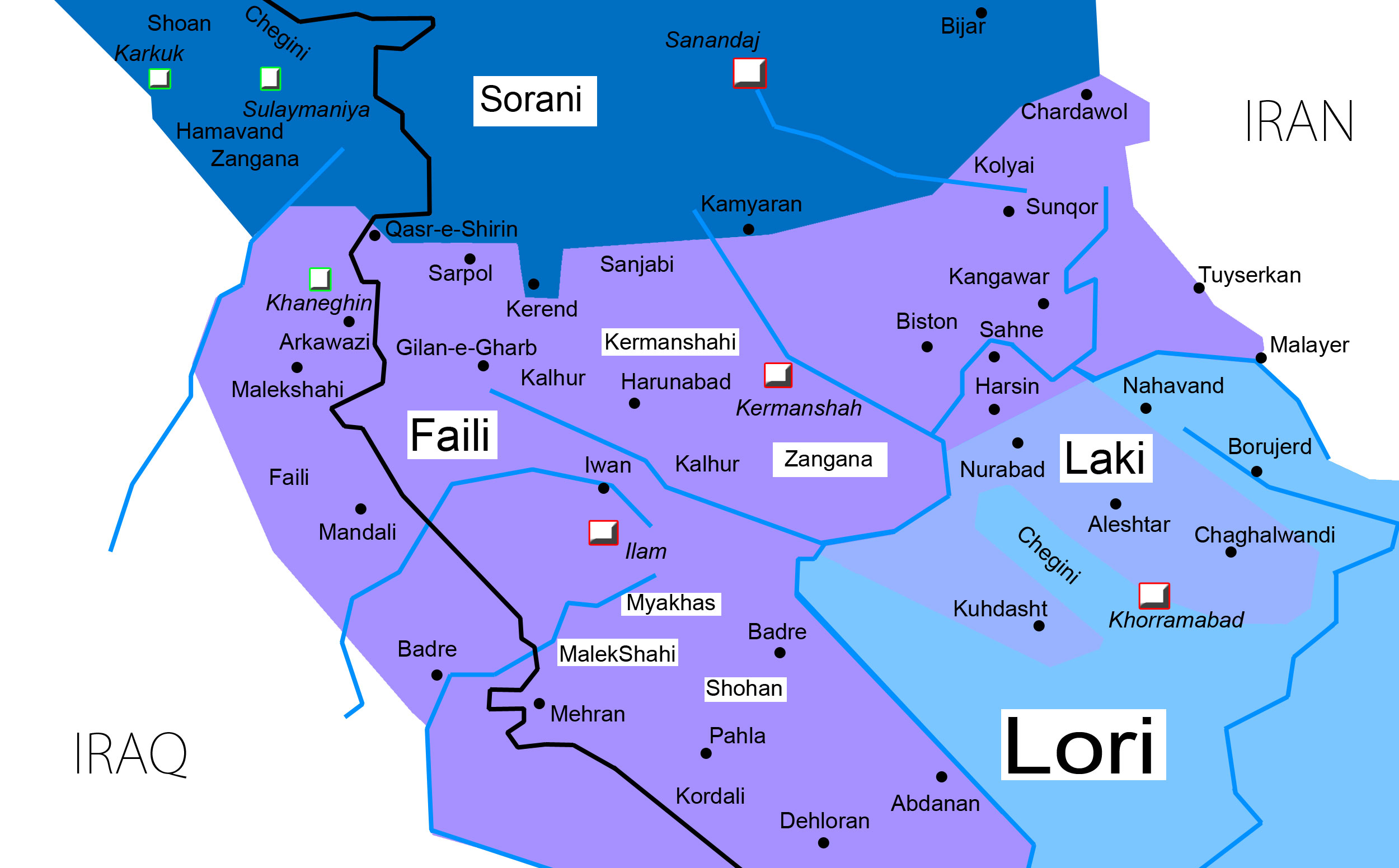

- Geographic distribution of Kurdish dialects and other Iranian languages spoken by Kurds Kurmanji (Northern Kurdish) Sorani (Central Kurdish) Zaza language Xwarin (Southern Kurdish) (Gorani is included) mixed dialect areas

Southern Kurdish, (Note: Kurdish: کوردی خوارین، کوردی باشووری, romanized: Kurdiya Xwarîn, Kurdiya Başûrî) also known by its endonym Xwarîn, is a Kurdish language variety, spoken predominantly in northeastern Iraq and western Iran. The Southern Kurdish-speaking region spans from Khanaqin in Iraq to Dehloran southward and Asadabad eastward in Iran.

== Name ==
The term "Southern Kurdish" was introduced by linguists, and speakers were unfamiliar with the term and did not refer to the language as such. Southern Kurdish speakers historically referred to their speech solely as "Kurdish" (Kurdî, Kwirdî), and in contexts where they had to distinguish their dialect from the neighboring dialects, they usually called it "our own Kurdish" ("Kurdi xoman", "Kurdi wizhman") or just added tribal or geographical labels, such as "Kurdi Kalhori" (meaning "Kurdish spoken by the Kalhor") or "Kurdi Kermashani" (meaning "Kurdish spoken in Kermanshah"). The terms "Kalhori", "Feyli", "Pa[h]lawani" and "Kermanshahi" were used to collectively describe the Southern Kurdish dialects, although linguists generally preferred the term "Southern Kurdish" as it covered all the dialects without generalizing them under the name of one tribe or region.

== Variants ==
Southern Kurdish has many variants, as linguist Fattah divides them into 35 varieties. These include:

- Bîcarî
  - The most septentrional variety of Southern Kurdish spoken in and around Bijar in Iran. Bîcarî is the only Southern Kurdish variety detached from the greater Southern Kurdish-speaking region.
- Qurweyî (Chahar Dawli Xarbi)
  - The Quwreyî variety is spoken around Ghorveh in Iran and is related to the variety spoken in Asadabad and other Kurdish-speaking areas in Hamadan Province.
- Kulyayî
  - The Kulyayî variety is spoken northeast of Kermanshah, principally in Sonqor County and surrounding counties. The variety also spans into the Kolyai Rural District in Hamadan Province.
- Bîlewerî
  - The principal Southern Kurdish variety in Poshtdarband Rural District in Kermanshah.
- Dînewerî
  - About 83 villages in Dinavar District speak the Dînewer variety. The differences between the Dînewerî and the Kulyayî varieties are anodine.
- Sehne / Lekî-Kirmaşanî
  - The Sehne variety, or Lekî-Kirmaşanî has many similar characteristics with Lekî and is spoken in Harsin County and in Sahneh. What distinguishes it most from Lekî is the lack of the ergative case.
- Kurdelî a.k.a. Pahlavi is quite distant, and may be a distinct language.

Other variants include: Bîstûnî, Çihrî, Hersîn, Payrawend, Kirmaşanî, Sencabî, Xalesa, Çemçemal, Qesri Şîrînî, Serpuli Zehawî, Harasam, Kelhurrî, Îwan, Erkewazî, Şêrwanî, Îlamî, Salihabadî, Rîka, Bedreyî, Melikşahî, Mêxasî, Mihran, Xaneqînî, Mendilî, Duşêxî, Kaprat, Warmizyar, Zurbatiya and Feylî.

== Alphabet ==
The Southern Kurdish alphabet is very similar to the Central Kurdish (Sorani) alphabet, which is a derivation of the Arabic alphabet. Southern Kurdish has one additional letter "ۊ"; the Arabic letter waw with two dots above.

ع	ش	س	ژ	ز	ڕ	ر	د	خ	ح	چ	ج	ت	پ	ب	ا	ئـ
17	16	15	14	13	12	11	10	9	8	7	6	5	4	3	2	1
ێ	ی	ۊ	ۆ	و	ە	ھ	ن	م	ڵ	ل	گ	ک	ق	ڤ	ف	غ
34	33	32	31	30	29	28	27	26	25	24	23	22	21	20	19	18

== See also ==
- Kalhor
- Khulam Rada Khan Arkawazi
- Sanjâbi
- Zangana
- Central Kurdish
- Kurmanji

== Bibliography ==
- Fattah, Ismaïl Kamandâr (2000), Les dialectes Kurdes méridionaux, Acta Iranica, ISBN 9042909188
