= Gerdab-e Sangi =

- گرداوو بردینه
- Location: Khorramabad, Iran
- Coordinates: 33°29′29″N 48°20′56″E
- Type: Whirlpool
- Material: Stone, mortar
- Width: 3 m (9.8 ft)
- Height: 12 m (39 ft)
- Completion date: Sassanid Empire era
- Opening date: Yes

Gerdab-e Sangi or Gerdau Bardineh (Persian: گرداب سنگی, Lurish: گرداوو بردینه) is a historical stony whirlpool from the Sassanid era located in Takhti Square of Khorramabad in Lorestan province, Iran. This building with a diameter of 18 meters and width of 3 meters and a height of 12m of well floor has surrounded around the seasonal well. Well that Gerdab-e-Sangi is fed by it has water from mid-winter to mid-summer and at other times is dry. The stony whirlpool has been constructed of stone, whereas itself is a mixture of stone and mortar. Gerdab-e Sangi is registered on the list of National Monuments.
