= Shapur Khast =

Ancient Sasanian city in Iran

- Type: Settlement
- Location: Khorramabad, Lorestan Province, Iran
- Part of: Sasanian Empire

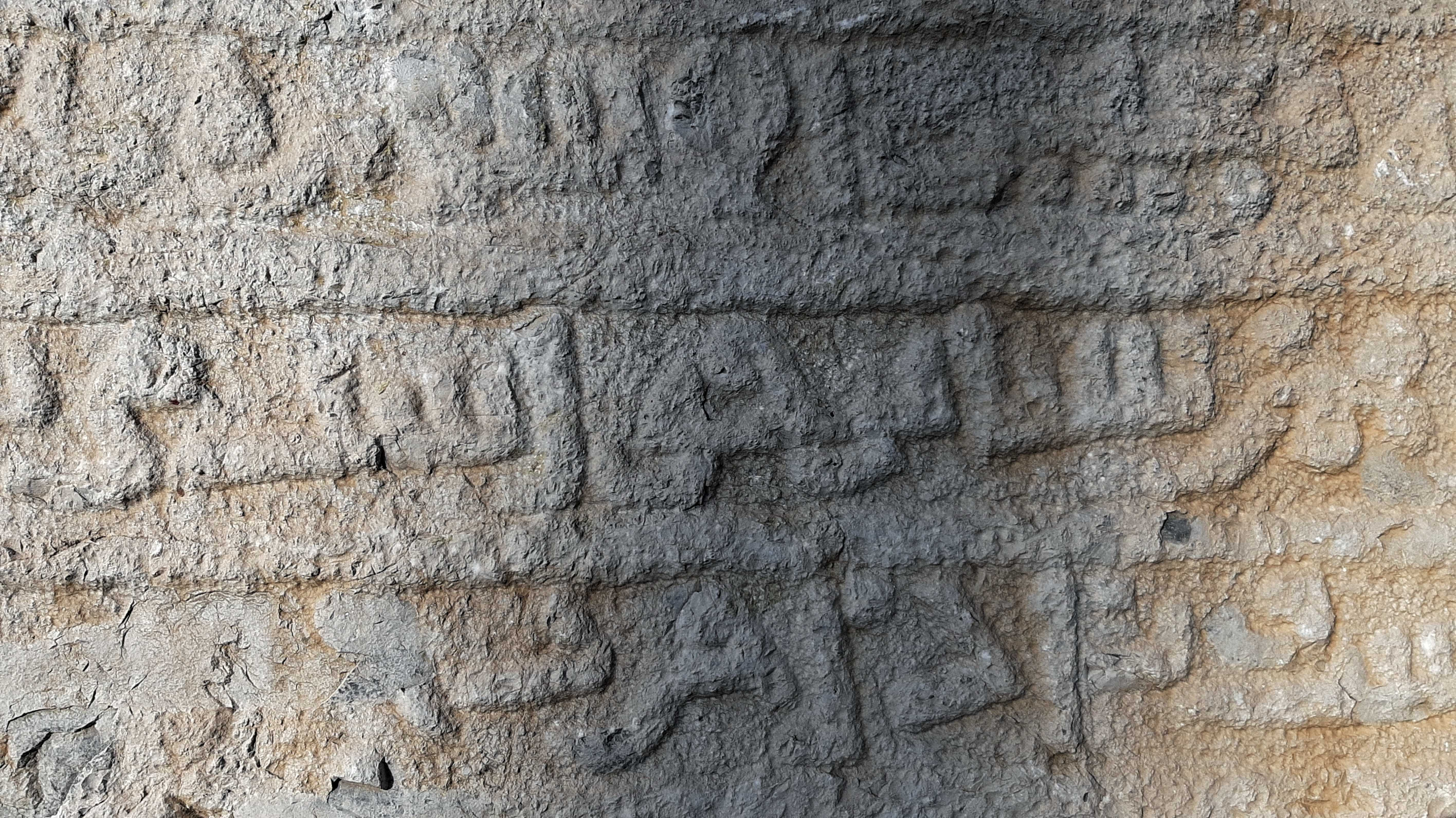
ShapurKhast name in Kufic script on Sang Nebeshteh monument

Shapur Khast (Persian: شاپورخواست) was an ancient city in the Sasanian Empire of Iran. The city was located where Khorramabad is today. Shapur Khast was destroyed during the Mongol invasion of Iran.

== History ==
When during the early decades of Christian century, Ardeshir Babakan started the Sasanian Empire after the Parthian Empire, the first Sassanid kings built new cities in their nation. Shapur I was the king who ordered the construction of Shapur Khast. At that point, cities in western Iran were centers for trade, industrial production, and also the establishment of security for Royal Routes. Today, the monumental structures such as Shapuri Bridge and the Shapur Khast Castle (Falak-ol-Aflak) exist in Khorramabad.

== Shapur Khast Castle ==
The Shapur Khast Castle was built during the Sassanid period. It is situated atop a hill. The castle dates back to over 1800 years ago. The Cultural Heritage Organization of Iran is in charge of protecting this site.

== See also ==
- Ancient Near East
- Khaydalu
