= Brick Minaret =

Historic building in Khorramabad, Iran

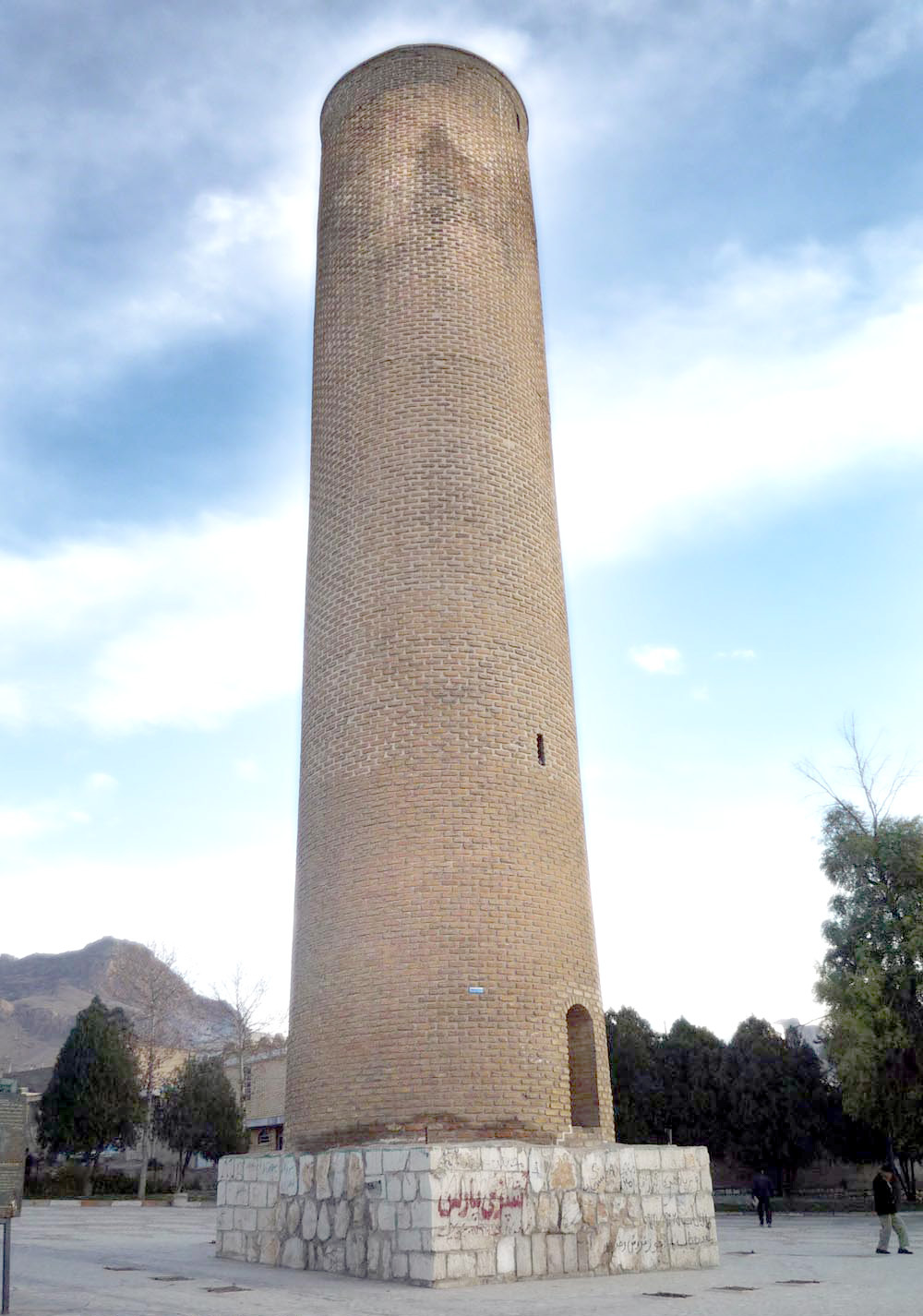
- The Brick Minaret in Khorramabad

- Location within Iran

Religion
- Affiliation: Islam
- Province: Lorestan

Location
- Location: Khorramabad, Iran
- Municipality: Khorramabad
- Coordinates: 33.46802629°N 48.35283369°E

Architecture
- Type: Minaret

Specifications
- Height (max): 30 m (98 ft)
- Materials: Brick

Brick Minaret (Persian: مناره آجری) is a historic minaret in Khorramabad, Iran. This Minaret is close to the Falak-ol-Aflak Castle and was built to help caravans find their ways through dark nights. To facilitate this, a fire was lit on top of the minaret, which was visible from long distances. The Brick Minaret is now located in the south of Khorramabad, and is registered on the list of National Monuments.
