= Niki Mozaffari =

Iranian actress

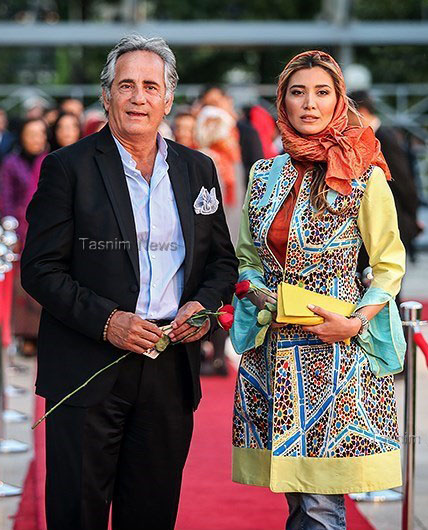
- Majid Mozaffari and Niki Mozaffari at 16th Hafez Awards.jpg
- Born: Niki Mozaffari; 1987 Sep; Iran, Tehran
- Education: London

Niki Mozafari (born September 19, 1987, in Tehran) is an actress from Tehran, Iran and the daughter of Majid Mozafari. Niki Mozafari completed the acting course in the classes of Hamid Samandarian.

== Awards and honors ==
- Received the international award for the best actress for the short film Granite, written and directed by Mona Aziz and produced by Ruhollah Fakhro, at the David Festival of Turkey (DMOFF_).
- The entry of the short film "Passage" directed by Niki Mozafari, International Short Film Festival of India.
- The entry of the short film Passage, directed by Niki Mozafari, to the 11th American Trenton Festival.
- The entry of the short film Passage, directed by Niki Mozafari, to the Gila Valley Festival in America.
- The entry of the short film Passage, directed by Niki Mozafari, to the 8th West Sound Festival in America.

== Filmography ==
Film	Director	Year
Charknovis	Ali Janab	2013
Blind Spot	Mehdi Golestane	2015
Ajir	Mohsen Khan Jahani	2006
Shadows of the invasion	Ahmad Amini	1992

=== Television ===
Name	Director	Year
Children, stories		
The sixth side	Masoud Froutan	1993
familiar stranger	Mehdi Sabbaghzadeh	2013
Pretty bad guys	Sirus Moghaddam	2013
