= Fereydoon Shahbazyan =

Iranian musician (1942–2025)

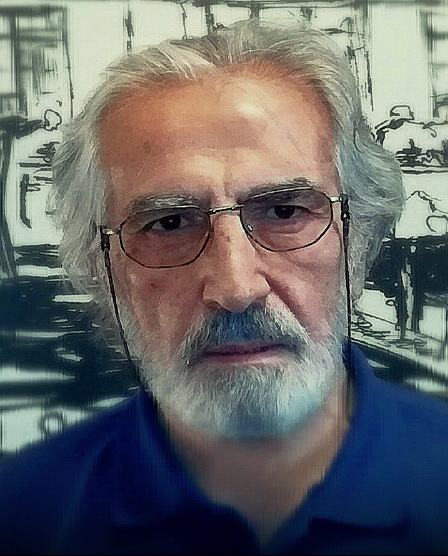

Background information
- Also known as: Fereydoon Shahbazian
- Born: 11 June 1942; Tehran, Iran
- Died: 11 January 2025 (aged 82) Tehran, Iran
- Occupations: Composer, conductor, performing musician
- Instruments: Violin, piano
- Years active: 1966–2025

Fereydoon Shahbazyan (Persian: فریدون شهبازیان, 11 June 1942 – 11 January 2025) was an Iranian musician, composer and conductor. He was the conductor of the National Orchestra of Iran.

== Life and career ==
Fereydoun Shahbazyan was born on 11 June 1942 in Fakhr Razi Street, University of Tehran. His father, Hossein Shahbazyan, was a well-known violinist. With the encouragement and guidance of his father, Fereydoon turned to music and studied music at the Higher Conservatory of Music and learned to play the violin. His first violin teacher was Ataollah Khadem Misagh, who soon introduced him to his Russian teacher, Serge Khutsif.

He studied with Khutsif until the end of elementary school. After that, he continued to study the violin until obtaining a diploma in playing this instrument, in the night classes of "Luigi Pasanari", which at that time was the concertmaster of the Tehran Symphony Orchestra. At the age of 17, he became a member of the Tehran Symphony Orchestra led by Heshmat Sanjari, after which he began his collaboration with the Radio Flower Orchestra. At that time, the Golha Orchestra was led by Ruhollah Khaleghi, followed by Javad Maroufi. In 1966, he became the leader of the radio choir and symphony orchestra.

Shahbazyan was a graduate of the Faculty of Fine Arts, University of Tehran. Shahbazyan also began composing for the film in the 1980s.Together with Ali Moallem Damghani, he formed the Music Council of the Radio and television, which was responsible for overseeing and supporting pop music. He was retired from the Radio and Television and was one of the critics of Iranian pop music.

From September 2016 to March 2019, Fereydoon Shahbazyan was the conductor of the National Orchestra of Iran. After resigning from the artistic management and permanent leadership of the National Orchestra of Iran, Shahbazyan was appointed the music consultant of the Roudaki Foundation, who resigned from this position on 21 May 2019.

Fereydoon Shahbazyan started his career in cinema and starred in "Aghaye Hirglif" directed by Gholamali Erfan in 1980. He has composed pieces and music for many movies and TV series.

The commemoration ceremony of Fereydoon Shahbazyan was held on 9 June 2019 at Niavaran Cultural Center.

Shahbazyan died on the morning of 11 January 2025, at the age of 82.

== Compositions for television and film ==
Some of the soundtracks made by Fereydoun Shahbazyan are:

- Dusters, Director: Davood Roustaei
- Long trips of Hami and Kami in the homeland, Director: Nader Ebrahimi
- The coin (Short), Director: Nemat Haghighi
- Horse, Director: Masoud Kimiai
- Said all three of them, Director: Gholamali Erfan
- Mr. Hieroglyph, Director: Gholamali Erfan
- Towards Simorgh, (documentary) Director: Hamid Soheyli
- DadShah, Director: Habib Kavosh
- Mirza Kuchak Khan, Director: Amir Ghavidel
- Who has Traveled, Director: Ahmad Nik Azar
- Autumn, Director: Rasoul Sadrameli
- Najaf Daryabandari: A Window on the World (Documentary short), Director: Bahman Maghsoudlou
- The Time I Came Back, Director: Vahid Mousaian
- Sufferance and Ecstasy, Director: Jahangir Almasi
- Golchehreh, Director: Vahid Mousaian
- Mahfel-e X, Director: Habib Kavosh
- Earring, Director: Vahid Mousaian
- Deportees, Director: Masoud Dehnamaki
- Khaneye roshan, Director: Vahid Mousaian
- Silence of the Sea, Director: Vahid Mousaian
- Aye zohaye zamin, Director: Vahid Mousaian
- The Last Supper, Director: Fereydoun Jeyrani
- Roomeshkan, Director: Naser Gholamrezai
- Agha-ye raees-jomhoor, Director: Abholghassem Talebi
- Heeva, Director: Rasool Mollagholi Poor
- Namzadi, Director: Naser Gholamrezai
- Yek mard, yek khers, Director: Masoud Jafari Jozani
- Se mard-e aami, Director: Siamak Taghipour
- Eye of the Hurricane, Director: Masoud Jafari Jozani
- Salha-ye khakestar, Director: Mehdi Sabbaghzadeh
- Vakil-e avval, Director: Jamshid Heydari
- Autumn, Director: Rasoul Sadrameli
- Shiler Valley Saga, Director: Ahmad Hasani Moghadam
- The Stone Lion, Director: Masoud Jafari Jozani
- Aavaar, Director: Sirus Alvand
- Silken Chains, Director: Hasan Karbakhsh

== Awards ==
- Forough Farrokhzad Award for Best Composer
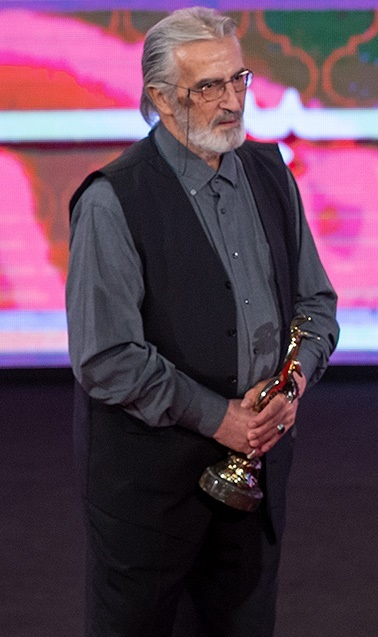
  Fereydoon Shahbazyan
- Nominated for Best Composer at the Fajr Film Festival for The Stone Lion, 1986
- Nominated for Best Composer at Fajr Film Festival for First Lawyer, 1987
- Nominated as the best composer at the Fajr Film Festival for the film in the Way of the Storm, 1988
- Honorary diploma for the best composer from the 15th Fajr Film Festival for nomination, 1996
- Statue of the best composer from the first period of the Cinema House celebration for the nomination film, 1997
- Nominated for Best Composer at the Third Cinema House Festival for Hiva, 1999
- Nominated for Best Composer at the Fajr Film Festival for My Wishes, 2001
- Nominated for Best Composer at the 6th Cinema House Festival for My Wishes, 2002
- Statue of the best composer from the 48th Asia-Pacific Film Festival for the film Extinction of the Sea, 2004
- Nominated for Best Composer at the Cinema House Festival for Golchehreh, 2011
- Nominated for Best Composer at Fajr Film Festival for Fourth child, 2012
- Nominated for Best Composer at the Cinema House Festival for The Fourth Child, 2014
