= Santouri (film) =

2007 Iranian drama film

- Directed by: Dariush Mehrjui
- Written by: Vahideh Mohammadifar; Dariush Mehrjui
- Produced by: Faramarz Farazmand; Dariush Mehrjui
- Starring: Bahram Radan; Golshifteh Farahani; Roya Teymourian; Masoud Rayegan
- Cinematography: Touraj Mansouri
- Edited by: Mehdi Hosseinvand
- Music by: Mohsen Chavoshi
- Distributed by: Hedayat Film
- Release date: February 2007 (Fajr)
- Running time: 106 minutes
- Country: Iran
- Language: Persian

Santouri (known as The Music Man; Persian: سنتوری, also Romanized as Santoori) with the previous name of Ali Santouri is a 2007 Iranian musical drama film directed by Dariush Mehrjui dealing with the life of a santour player named Ali Bolourchi. The film's title, "Santouri" refers to one who can play the santour instrument. In Persian "playing the Santour" is also the euphemism for injecting heroin into one's veins; thrashing, for instance, one's arm for causing the main artery of the arm to swell, in preparation for the injection, is reminiscent of playing the santour.

The film has only been screened once in Iran and it has had limited release screenings in North America as well as some showings at various film festivals.

== Plot ==
The film begins near the end of the film's timeline. Ali Bolourchi, a santour player (Bahram Radan) narrates his life after his wife Hanieh (Golshifteh Farahani) left him. Ali now makes a living playing music with his band at weddings and house parties where he is often given drugs instead of money to support his heroin addiction. At one of the weddings in which Ali is playing, a mob opposed to the wedding storm the party, beat the guests, destroy the band's instruments and break Ali's arm. The story then flashes back to happier times when Ali and his wife Hanieh are coming up with the lyrics of the song which Ali was singing at the wedding. The film then shows a house party where Ali is performing and his drug use with his friend and bandmate Tamayol (Mahyar Pourhessabi) are highlighted. At the same party Hanieh meets a musician named Javid (Siamak Khahani) who invites Hanieh to join a musical group that plays for charities and goodwill events. The film then shows the downfall of Ali and Hanieh's marriage caused by Ali's increasing drug use as well as his hate for Javid. Ali beats Hanieh and she goes to her mother's (Maedeh Tahmasebi) house. Hanieh later explains to Javid that Ali's tapes and concerts were banned by the government forcing him to play at house parties and weddings to make ends meet, but for payment he was often given drugs and booze instead of money leading to his addiction. Again the film flashes back to happier times, showing how Hanieh and Ali met, their courtship, wedding and the beginnings of their married life.

The night after Ali's arm is broken he goes to his parents’ home where he interrupts a large prayer session, begging for money and shouting as a result of not getting his fix. His mother (Roya Teymourian) calls Ali's brother Hamed (Nader Soleymani) to calm him down. Ali then is visited by his father, Haj Mohsen Bolourchi (Masoud Rayegan), a wealthy and conservative member of the bazaar who is shocked to see Ali is now injecting heroin. Ali's parents had disowned Ali after he refused to stop playing music. Ali continues to use what little money he has left on his drug habit and is eventually kicked out of his apartment when the owner decides to demolish the building. Ali ends up living in the street and parks with other drug addicts. His wife Hanieh, who has now divorced Ali and is going to move to Canada with her new husband Javid accidentally sees Ali one day. She calls his father who has people find Ali and take him to a drug rehabilitation center. There Ali slowly loses his addiction but begs the rehab center's doctor not to let him leave as he is afraid he will go back to his addiction again. The film finally ends with scenes of Ali teaching the rest of the drug rehab patients music lessons and performing a concert.

== Cast ==
- Bahram Radan as Ali Bolourchi. Ali Bolourchi is a young santur player and singer who is addicted to drugs. He is from a wealthy and conservative family who have disowned him for his refusal to give up playing the santur. He is married to Hanieh.
- Golshifteh Farahani as Hanieh. Ali Bolourchi's wife . She is also a skilled pianist.
- Masoud Rayegan as Haj Moshen Bolourchi. Ali Bolourchi's father . He is head of the "Crystal Producers Union of Iran" and is extremely wealthy.
- Roya Teymourian as Ali's mother. Ali Bolourchi's mother . She is a religious woman who was very much opposed to her son's lifestyle and choices.
- Nader Soleimani as Hamed Bolourchi. Ali's older brother who is very bitter towards his parents for controlling his life.
- Siamak Khahani as Javid. A talented violinist who befriends Hanieh and eventually marries her moving with her to Canada.
- Mahyar Pourhessabi as Tamayol. The drummer in Ali's band one of his drug suppliers.
- Maedeh Tahmasebi as Hanieh's mother. She is Hanieh's mother and like her daughter, also a skilled pianist.
- Hasan Pourshirazi

== Production ==
The film was originally entitled Ali Santouri but was changed soon after. Production began in 2006 and ended the same year spanning seventy days. All of the filming took place in and around Tehran. For the singing scenes, Ardavan Kamkar played the santour while Mohsen Chavoshi provided the vocals. Radan lip synched the song and moved the santour mallets in the correct manner but wasn't actually playing.

== Music ==
The music for the film was composed by Mohsen Chavoshi. Chavoshi's voice was used as Ali Santouri's singing voice in the film and Ardavan Kamkar played the music. In October 2011, the film's album was officially released.

== Release ==
The film was first screened for critics and guests in February 2007 at the Fajr Film Festival. A couple of scenes were cut out as the festival was held during the month of Muharram. The film was supposed to be released publicly in Iran on July 25, 2007 but for unknown reasons this did not happen. The film was then set for release on 13 October 2007 which coincided with Eid ul-Fitr, but again the film was not released. At first the film was not released because for the singing segments of the film, the voice of Mohsen Chavoshi was used, who at the time did not have a permit for public performances from the Ministry of Culture and Islamic Guidance in Iran. To solve this problem the editors used Bahram Radan's voice and altered it digitally to make it sound similar to Chavoshi's. Even after this the film was not released. The head of the Ministry of Culture, Hossein Saffar Harandi was personally against the screening of the film and said that he would not allow it to be shown while he was in charge of the ministry, even though the film had all the necessary requirements and had been screened once before in Iran.

The film was then shown at a number of film festivals in South Korea, Japan and the Czech Republic. On January 25, 2008, the film was released in Canada and the United States. Soon after, high quality DVD and VCD copies of the movie became available in Iran, making the chances of Santouri ever being shown nationwide on cinema screens in Iran very low.

== Awards ==
Fajr Film Festival:

- Won: Crystal Simorgh Audience Award
- Won: Best Actor in a Leading Role (Bahram Radan)
