= Navid Ghasemi =

Personal information
- Full name: Navid Ghasemi
- Born: August 26, 1991 (age 35) Khorramabad, Iran

Cycling career
- Sport: Cycling
- Discipline: BMX
- Role: Rider and coach

Navid Ghasemi (born 26 August 1991) is an Iranian BMX cyclist and coach. He is a former member of the Iran national BMX team and currently serves as the head coach of the national team.

== Career ==
Ghasemi has been active in BMX cycling as both an athlete and a coach. He has also served as the head of the BMX Committee of the Cycling Federation of the Islamic Republic of Iran.

== Achievements ==
- Winner of the Iranian National BMX Championships in 2019.
- Finished in 11th place at the 2019 Asian BMX Championships.
- Head coach of the Iran national BMX team.
