= Mehraneh Mahin Torabi =

Iranian actress (born 1957)

Mehraneh Mahintorabi
- مهرانه مهین‌ترابی
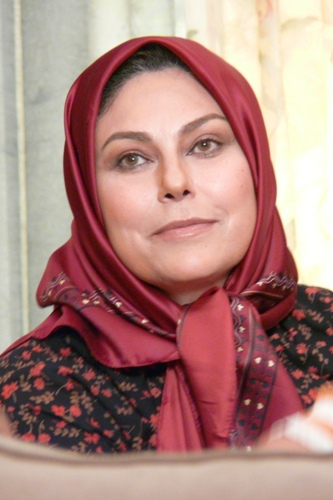
- Mahin Torabi in 2008
- Born: 11 August 1957 (age 68); Karaj, Iran
- Occupation: Actress
- Years active: 1977–present

Mehraneh Mahintorabi (Persian: مهرانه مهین‌ترابی; born 11 August 1957 in Karaj, Alborz province, Iran) is an Iranian actress. She gained popularity for her portrayal of Mahin in TV series, "Hamsaraan (Spouses)" and her role as Atefeh in "Khaneye Sabz (The Green House)".

== Early life and education ==
Mahintorabi is the fourth of five siblings. She has received her bachelor's degree in acting and directing from University of Tehran, Faculty of Fine Arts.

== Career ==
She started her career as an actress by playing a role in a play named "Taleh (Trap)" in 1977. Her debut in cinema was in Golbahar(1986)" and her first TV appearance was in Mash Kheyrollah, Sandoghcheye Asrar (1991).

== Movies and series ==
- Lovers (2018 TV series)
- Everything is there (2014)
- Zamaneh (2013)
- Atashbas 2 (2014)
- Love is not Closed (2014)
- Shamsol-emareh
- Crimes and Misdemeanors
- Nargess (TV series)
- In the Strand of Zayandeh Rud (TV series)

== See also ==
- Behnoosh Tabatabaei
- Behnoosh Bakhtiari
