= Masoud Rayegan =

Iranian actor and writer

- مسعود رایگان
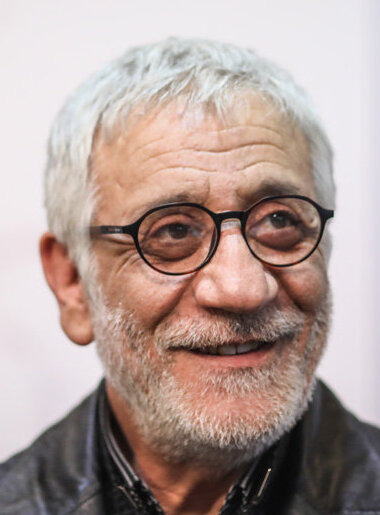
- Rayegan in 2020
- Born: January 21, 1954 (age 71); Khoramabad, Iran
- Occupation: Actor
- Spouse: Roya Teymourian

Masoud Rayegan (Persian: مسعود رایگان, also Romanized as "Mas’ūd Rāyegān") is an Iranian actor and writer born on January 21, 1954, in Khoramabad, Iran. He was nominated for the Crystal Simorgh Best Actor award at the 23rd Fajr International Film Festival for his performance in the film So Close, So Far.

He is husband of Roya Teymourian.

== Filmography ==
- So Close, So Far
- Santouri
- Predicament
- The Searchers (TV series)
- The Recall (TV series)
- Golchehreh
- Lovers (TV series)
- In the Strand of Zayandeh Rud (TV series)
- Nafas (TV series)
