= In the Strand of Zayandeh Rud =

2010 television series

- Persian: در مسیر زاینده‌رود
- Genre: Drama
- Written by: Ali Reza Naderi
- Directed by: Hassan Fathi
- Starring: Ashkan Khatibi; Mehdi Soltani; Masoud Rayegan; Behnoosh Tabatabaei; Mehraneh Mahin Torabi; Hooman Barghnavard; Mehran Nael; Hamid Reza Azarang; Afsaneh Pakroo
- Theme music composer: Ehsan Khajeh Amiri
- Composer: Ehsan Khajeh Amiri
- Country of origin: Iran
- Original language: Persian
- No. of seasons: 1
- No. of episodes: 30

Production
- Producer: Esmaeil Afifeh
- Production location: Isfahan
- Cinematography: Afshin Ahmadi
- Running time: 35-40 minutes

Original release
- Release: 17 September – 27 October 2010

In the Strand of Zayandeh Rud (Persian: در مسیر زاینده‌رود) is an Iranian Drama series. The series is directed by Hassan Fathi.

== Storyline ==
A young football player named Mehran Sarang is going to Isfahan to sign a contract with an Isfahanian club (F.C.) and inadvertently kills a young Isfahan named Masoud Mosayeb, a cultural activist, in an accident. The story continues in this incident that...

== Cast ==
- Ashkan Khatibi
- Mehdi Soltani
- Masoud Rayegan
- Behnoosh Tabatabaei
- Mehraneh Mahin Torabi
- Hooman Barghnavard
- Mehran Nael
- Hamid Reza Azarang
- Afsaneh Pakroo
- Hossein Mahjoub
- Hossein Azarbara
- Mehdi Bagherbeigi
- Mehrdad Ziaei
- Pardis Afkari
- Azadeh Riazi
- Nima Naderi
- Shahrzad yazdani
- Behnaz Naderi
- Elaheh Hosseini

In some parts of this series, the following football players appeared as guest actors:

- Karim Bagheri
- Arash Borhani
- Vahid Shamsaei
- Esmaeil Farhadi
- Mohammad Salsali
- Farshid Talebi
- Ahmad Jamshidian
- Mehdi Jafarpour
