= Love in Persian =

2018 television film

- Genre: Television film
- Written by: Sebastian Orlac
- Directed by: Florian Baxmeyer
- Starring: Felix Klare; Mona Pirzad; Johanna Bittenbinder; Pejman Bazeghi; Roya Teymourian
- Countries of origin: Germany; Iran
- Original language: Persian German

Production
- Production locations: Munich, Kashan, Tehran
- Cinematography: Amir Maghooli
- Editor: Mark Broszeit
- Running time: 1 hour 29 minutes

Original release
- Network: ARD
- Release: 19 October 2018

Love in Persian (German: Liebe auf Persisch)(Persian: عشق به سبک فارسی) is a Television film in the genre of drama, romance and road directed by Florian Baxmeyer produced in Germany in 2018.

== Plot ==
Robert Leitner is a stiff young German recycling specialist who fell out with his father Achim. Then his father disappeared. His mother says he traveled to Iran to collect an old bill and thus save her company from bankruptcy. Robert then sets off for Iran at the request of his mother. There he is greeted by Shirin, an Iranian German teacher. At that time, her aunt Mehrnaz bought the weaving machines and then did not pay for them. Robert soon finds out that his father was often in Iran and a different person there.

Then Achim reappears at home. Robert stays in Iran anyway to learn more about his father from Mehrnaz. Since Robert and Shirin are not allowed to travel to Mehrnaz in Kaschan together, Robert first converts to Islam and then marries Shirin for a while. On the journey, the two get closer. Shirin, who is herself enthusiastic about the German poets Schiller and Goethe, shows Robert something of the Iranian culture. Robert, on the other hand, is reluctant. When Robert learns that Shirin is already engaged, he is disappointed.

Meanwhile Achim has also traveled to Iran and Kashan. Mehrnaz demands the 100,000 euros bridal allowance agreed in the marriage contract for Shirin, as Achim refuses to get to know their son Roshan. Achim then steals two valuable carpets and wants to flee with his son. When Robert found out, he gave the carpets back to Mehrnaz. His half-brother Roshan accompanies him and Achim to the airport. There they are overtaken by Mehrnaz and Shirin. Shirin said no at the wedding.

== Cast ==
- Felix Klare as Robert
- Mona Pirzad as Shirin
- Johanna Bittenbinder as Irmi Leitner
- Pejman Bazeghi as Roshan
- Roya Teymourian as Mehrnaz
- Günther Maria Halmer as Achim Leitner
- Bettina Mittendorfer as Frau Brahminger
- Titus Kuhn as Robert jung
- Sourus Parsah as Farzad

== Production ==
The film was produced under the name Hello, Persia (German: Grüß Gott, Persien). The film was the first foreign production in Iran since 1978. The shooting took place between September 5 and October 13, 2017 in Tehran, Kashan and Munich. Various scenes in Iran such as jumping into the pool and the common bed scene were filmed in Germany. An alternative cut version was created for Iranian television. The film was shown for the first time at the Festival of German Films in Ludwigshafen am Rhein. The film was first broadcast on ARD on Friday, October 19, 2018.

== Reception ==
Mona Pirzad is cute, otherwise little shines

—

Tittelbach.tv rates the film more positively.
