= Savushun (series) =

2025 Iranian miniseries

- Persian: سووشون
- Genre: Drama; Romance; Historical
- Created by: Narges Abyar
- Based on: Savushun by Simin Daneshvar
- Written by: Narges Abyar
- Directed by: Narges Abyar
- Starring: Milad Keymaram; Behnoosh Tabatabaei; Hootan Shakiba; Tarlan Parvaneh; Azadeh Samadi
- Composer: Mohammad Bakhtiari
- Country of origin: Iran
- Original language: Persian
- No. of seasons: 1
- No. of episodes: 14

Production
- Producer: Mohammad Hossein Ghasemi
- Cinematography: Pouyan Kafili
- Editor: Ashkan Mehri
- Budget: 200 billion Tomans; 8 billion Tomans (each part)

Original release
- Network: Namava
- Release: 30 May – 3 October 2025

Savushun is an Iranian Persian-language 2025 drama streaming series adapted from the novel Savushun, written by Simin Daneshvar, and is produced by Namava. The show was confiscated by the Iranian regime upon release of its first episode, with its release platform Namava being blocked in Iran. The plot is centered on an Iranian woman in World War 2 era. The show features an ensemble cast with a budget of more than 200 billion toman.

20 minutes of the first episode have been censored. A minute and two seconds of the show was reportedly uncensored. Narges Abyar, the series producer and director, has been admired by the Supreme Leader of the Iranian regime Ali Khamenei for their previous war films works.

== Cast ==
- Behnoush Tabatabaei as Zari, an Iranian conservative woman
  - Farzaneh Farnam as young Zari.
- Milad Keymaram as Yousef
  - Danial Poursabah as young Yousef
- Fereshteh Sadre Orafaee as Fatemeh
- Sam Derakhshani as Khan Kaka, Yousef's brother
- Maryam Sa'adat as Ezatoldoleh
- Armin Rahimian as Hamid
- Tarlan Parvaneh as Ferdos
- Majid Salehi as Motamed
- Mazdak Mirabedini as Zinger
- Babak Karimi as Dr. Abdollah
- Hootan Shakiba as Malek Sohrab
- Soheil Mostajabian as Fotouhi
- Azadeh Samadi as Soodabeh Hendi
- Reyhaneh Razi
- Sheida Yousefi
