= Lorestan University of Medical Sciences =

- دانشگاه علوم پزشکی و خدمات بهداشتی درمانی لرستان
- Established: 1986
- Chancellor: Dr. jalalaldin amiri
- Administrative staff: 310
- Students: 3,300
- Location: Khorramabad, Iran
- Campus: Urban
- Website: lums.ac.ir

Lorestan University of Medical Sciences (Persian: دانشگاه علوم پزشکی و خدمات بهداشتی درمانی لرستان) is a public university in Khorramabad, Iran. The University has six faculties in its campus including medicine, dentistry, pharmacy, health care, nursing, paramedicine and four satellite schools in Borujerd, Aligudarz, Pol-e Dokhtar, and Dorud.

== International Journals ==
1. Caring Today: https://caringtoday.lums.ac.ir/?lang=en
2. Herbal Medicines Journal: https://hmj.lums.ac.ir/index.php/hmj
3. Interdisciplinary Journal of Acute Care: https://ijac.lums.ac.ir/
4. Yafteh: https://yafte.lums.ac.ir/index.php
