= So Close, So Far =

2005 film

- Film poster
- Directed by: Reza Mirkarimi
- Written by: Mohammad Reza Gohari; Reza Mirkarimi
- Produced by: Reza Mirkarimi
- Starring: Masoud Rayegan; Afshin Hashemi; Elham Hamidi; Ashkan Khatibi; Mohammadreza Najafi
- Cinematography: Hamid Khozouie Abyane
- Edited by: Bahram Ardalan; Bahram Dehghan
- Music by: Mohammad Reza Aligholi
- Release date: February 2005
- Running time: 97 minutes
- Country: Iran
- Language: Persian

So Close, So far (Persian: خیلی دور، خیلی نزدیک, Kheili Dour, Kheili Nazdik) is a 2005 Iranian drama film directed by Reza Mirkarimi. The film was also selected as Iran's representative for Best Foreign Language Film at the Oscars.

== Plot ==
An arrogant neurologist must examine the meaning of his life when his son is diagnosed with an inoperable brain tumor. His trek through the desert to catch up with his son's astronomy field trip leads him to encounter a number of seemingly ordinary people who challenge his views and values.
