= Behnoosh Tabatabaei =

Iranian actress (born 1981)

Behnoush Tabatabaei
- بهنوش طباطبایی
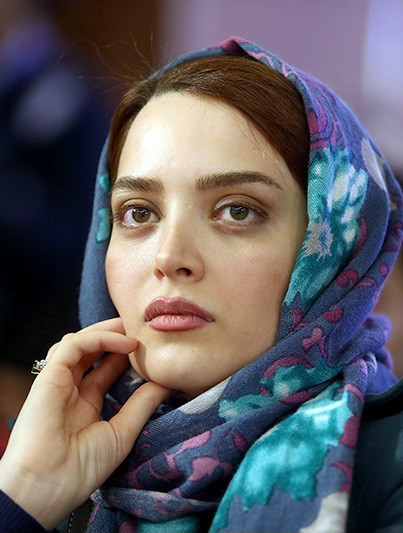
- Tabatabaei in Year 2014
- Born: May 17, 1981 (age 45); Tehran, Iran
- Education: University of Tehran Azad University (DClinPsych)
- Occupation: Actress
- Years active: 1998–present
- Spouse: Mahdi Pakdel (m. 2011; div. 2016)

Behnoush Tabatabaei (Persian: بهنوش طباطبایی; born May 17, 1981) is an Iranian actress. She has received various accolades, including two Hafez Awards. She earned a Crystal Simorgh nomination for her performance in Midday Adventure: Trace of Blood (2019).

== Early life ==
She has studied computer engineering and a short term of acting at University of Tehran.

Behnoush Tabatabaei was born on May 17, 1981, in Tehran, Iran. Her father, Seyed Nasser Tabatabaei, was a civil engineering expert in the former Ministry of Housing and Urban Development, and her mother was a schoolteacher. She is the second child in her family and has an older sister named Tinoosh. Tabatabaei developed an interest in acting during her elementary school years, where she was classmates with actress Merila Sharifinia. Inspired by Sharifinia’s role in the film The Doll Thief, Tabatabaei pursued her interest in acting and began formal training in 1993. She holds a bachelor’s degree in computer engineering and a doctorate in psychology. Additionally, she completed an acting course at the Faculty of Fine Arts, University of Tehran.

== Personal life ==
She met actor Mahdi Pakdel in 2007, and married him in March 2011. They divorced in 2016.

Tabatabaei met actor Mahdi Pakdel while working on the film Miss Dilemma. The two married on March 2, 2011, but after six years of marriage, they divorced in 2016.

== Filmography ==
=== Film ===
Year	Title	Role	Director	Notes	Ref(s)
2006	Calamities of the Maiden		Masoud Atyabi		
2007	Kalagh Par	Roya	Sharam Shah Hosseini		
2008	Brick Made Boys	Mahour	Majid Gharizadeh		
2008	Peel of Banana		Ali Atshani		
2012	The Freeway	Parisa	Abbas Rafei		
2012	Fasonation Steps		Hamid Bahmani		
2012	My Father's Love Story		Mohammad Reza Varzi		
2015	Luck, Love, Accident	Nahid	Arash Moayerian		
2016	Cyanide	Leila Zomorodian	Behrouz Shoeibi		
2017	Under the Smoky Roof	Ra'na	Pouran Derakhshandeh		
2017	Lobby		Mohamad Parvizi	Unreleased film	
2019	Gholamreza Takhti	Shahla Tavakoli	Bahram Tavakoli		
2019	Midday Adventures: Trace of Blood	Sima	Mohammad Hossein Mahdavian		

=== Web ===
Year	Title	Role	Director	Platform	Notes	Ref(s)
2025–present	Savushun	Zahra "Zari"	Narges Abyar	Namava	Leading role	

=== Television ===
Year	Title	Role	Director	Network	Ref(s)
2001	Traveler from India	Kati	Ghasem Jafari	IRIB TV3	
2004	Lost Love	Sima / Sima's mother	Hossein Soheilizadeh	IRIB TV3	
2010	Enclosure	Maryam	Sirous Moghaddam	IRIB TV1	
2010	In the Strand of Zayandeh Rud	Mitra Samavati	Hassan Fathi	IRIB TV1	
2010	Mokhtarnameh	Khashe'e	Davood Mirbagheri	IRIB TV1	
2011	Forgotten	Mina Naderi	Fereydoun Hassanpour	IRIB TV1	
2015	Michael	Yas	Sirous Moghaddam	IRIB TV1	

== Awards and nominations ==
Award	Year	Category	Nominated Work	Result
Fajr Film Festival	2019	Best Actress in a Leading Role	Midday Adventures: Trace of Blood	Nominated
Hafez Awards	2011	Best Actress – Television Series Drama	In the Strand of Zayandeh Rud	Won
Hafez Awards	2016	Best Actress – Television Series Drama	Michael	Nominated
Hafez Awards	2020	Best Actress – Motion Picture	Midday Adventures: Trace of Blood	Nominated
Hafez Awards	2025	Best Actress – Television Series Drama	Savushun	Won
Iran's Film Critics and Writers Association	2016	Best Actress in a Supporting Role	Cyanide	Nominated
