= Keeyow Lake =

Lake in Khorramabad, Iran

- سراو کیاو (Luba-Katanga)
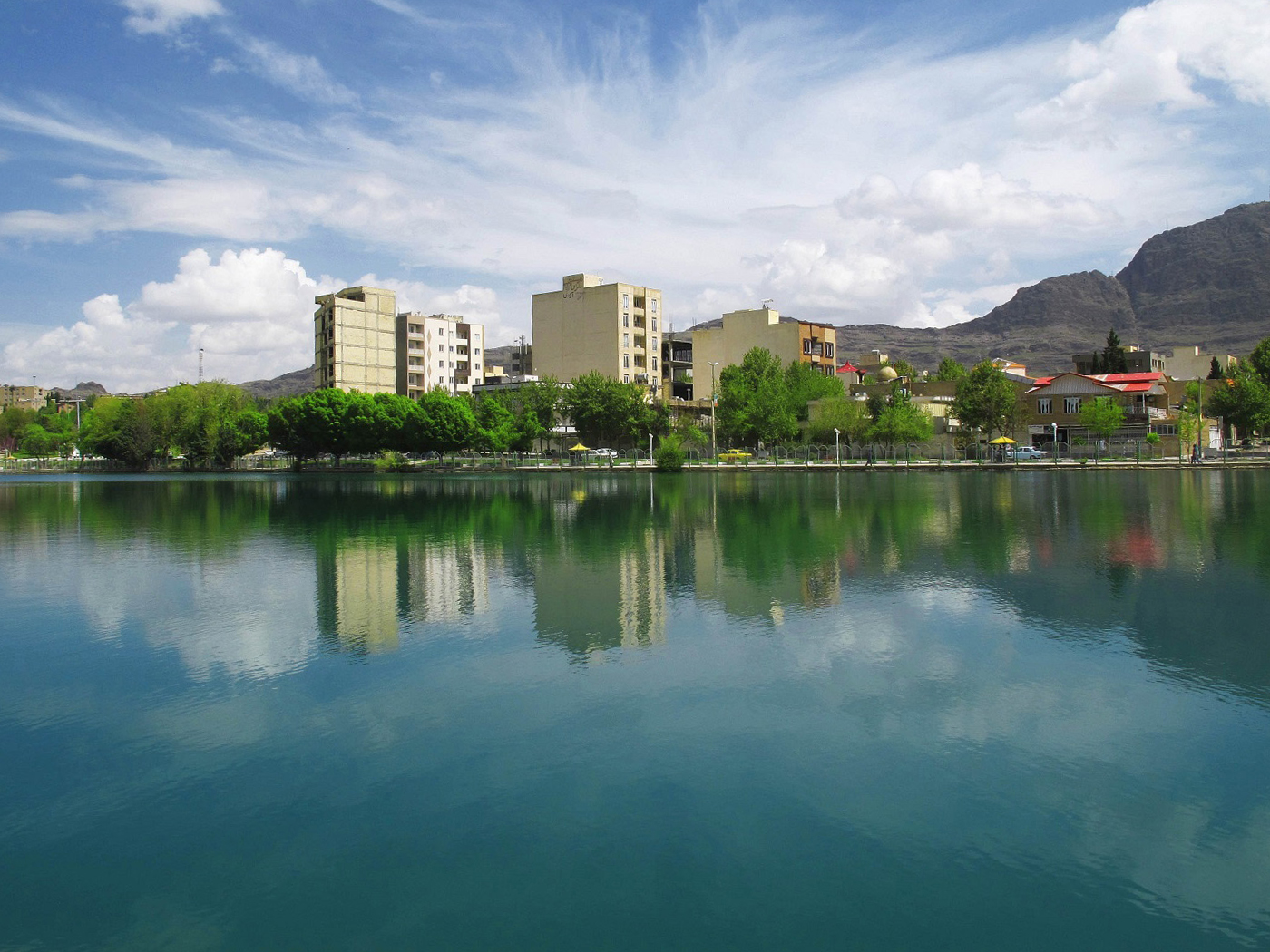

- Location within Iran
- Interactive map of Keeyow Lake
- Location: Khorramabad, Lorestan province, Iran
- Coordinates: 33°30′28.78″N 48°21′5.46″E
- Type: Natural lake
- Primary inflows: Main Keeyow lake Seasonal Spring (Located in north of lake); Transmitted water from Golestan Spring
- Primary outflows: Evaporation; Zibakenar park
- Catchment area: 7 hectares (17 acres)
- Basin countries: Iran
- Max. depth: 7 m (23 ft)

Keeyow Lake (Persian: دریاچه کیو, Lurish: سراو کیاو) is a natural lake northwest of Khorramabad in Lorestan province, Iran. The lake has a seven-hectare area and a depth of 3 to 7 meters. There is an amusement park as well as other recreational facilities next to the lake. It is the only natural city lake in Iran and is a habitat for native and migratory birds and aquatic animals.

== History ==
This lake was built during the years 1933 -1934. Subsequently, the municipal authorities completed it within a few years with extensive measures and standardized it in its current form. Among these actions was the construction of a tourist guest house and the construction of comfort and recreational facilities such as the game city around the lake.

== Gallery ==
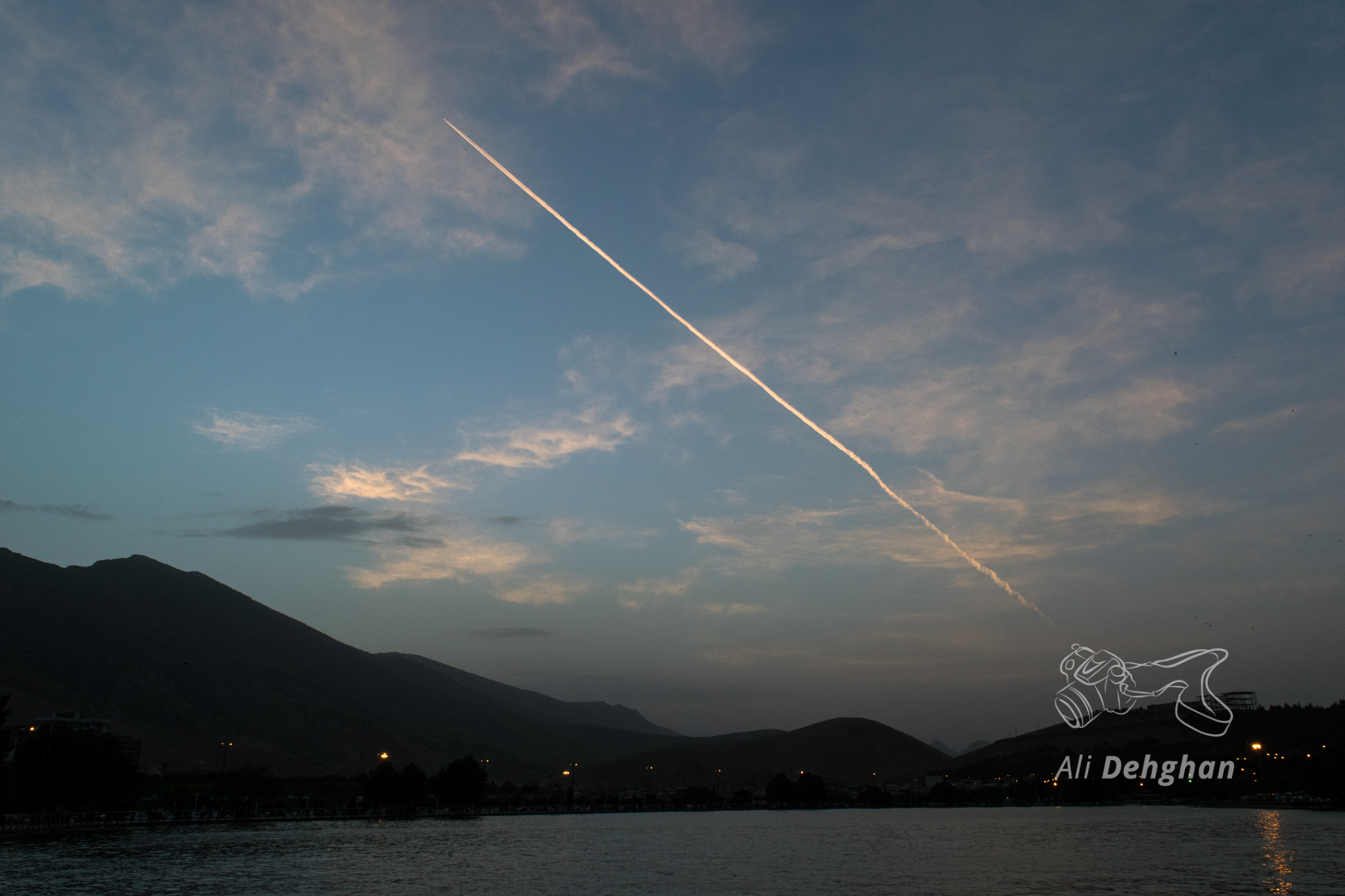
Keeyow Lake at sunset

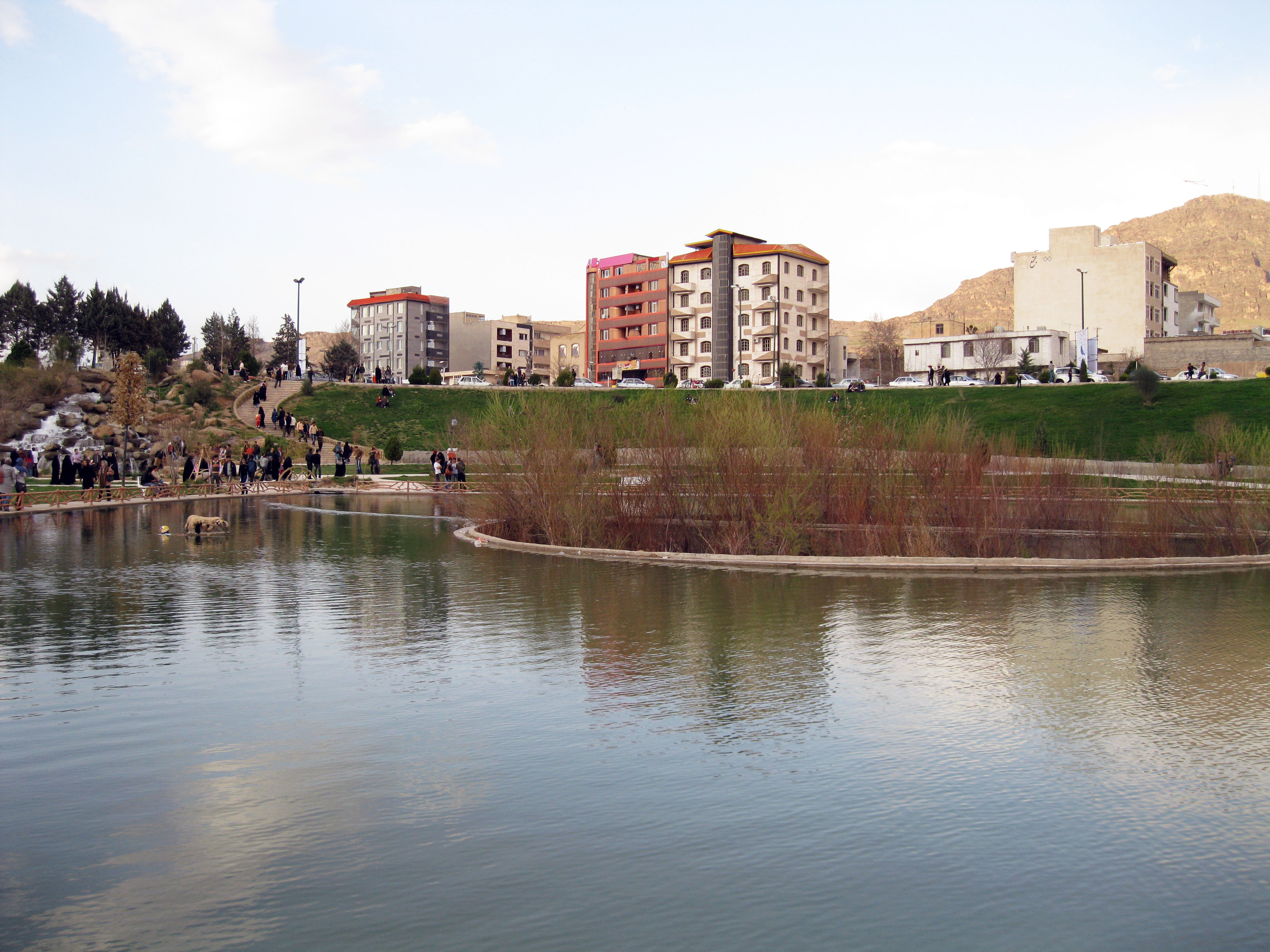
Mahi Lake and Zibakenar Park, located south of the lake.

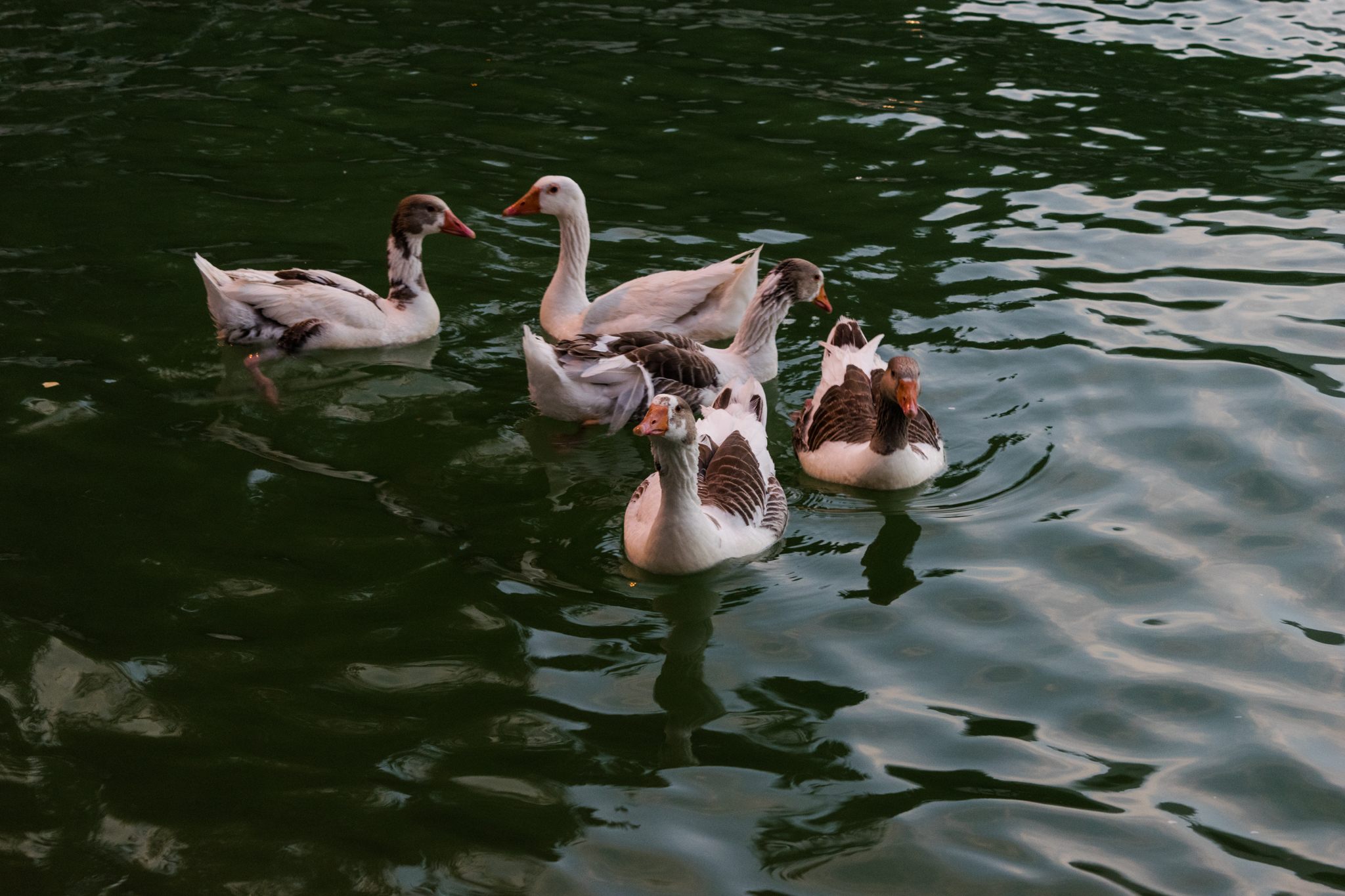
Feral geese on Keeyow Lake

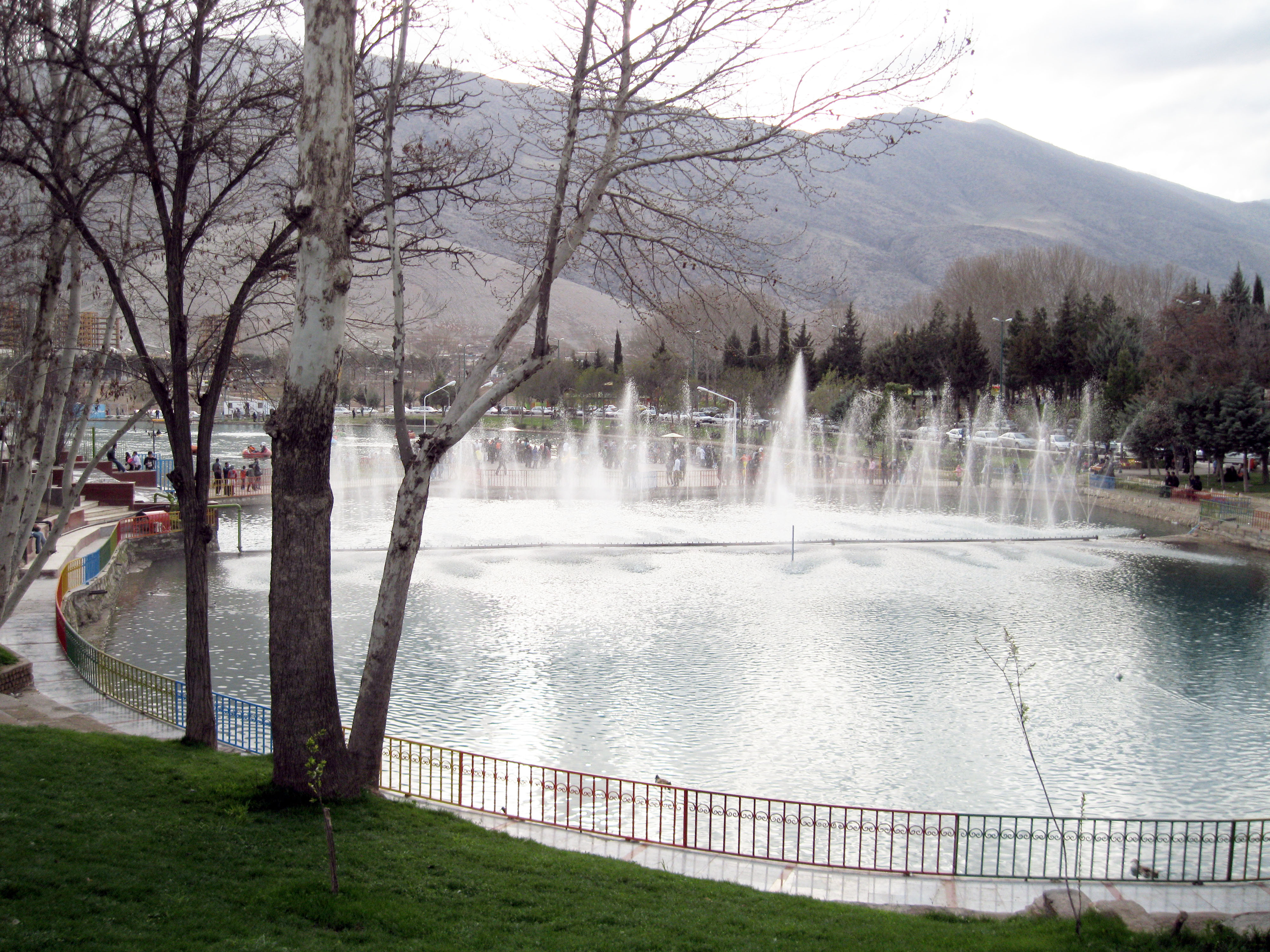
The main spring of Keeyow Lake (located north of the lake)
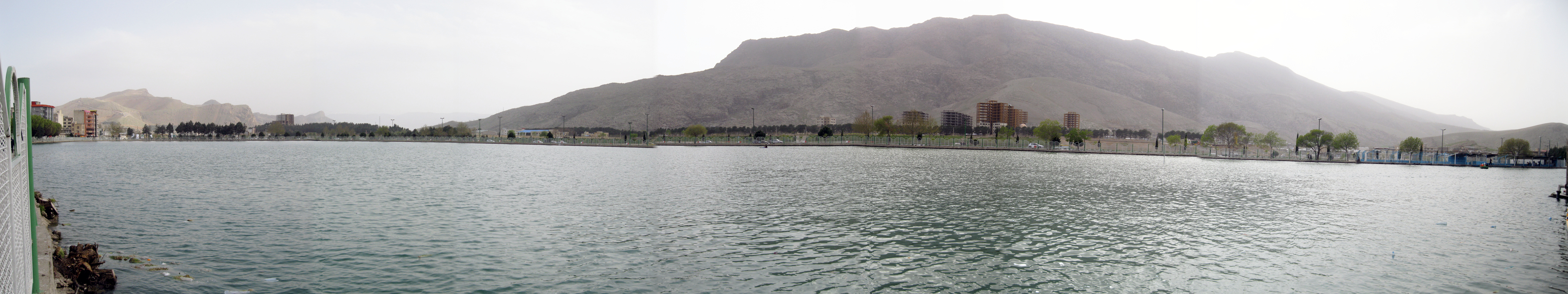
Panorama of Keeyow Lake
