= Lovers (Iranian TV series) =

2018 Iranian television series

- Persian: دلدادگان
- Genre: Drama,Romance
- Written by: Babak Kaydan; Mehdi Mohammad-Nejadian
- Directed by: Manouchehr Hadi
- Starring: Arash Majidi; Linda Kiani; Hamid Goodarzi; Masoud Rayegan; Pantea Bahram; Mehraneh Mahin Torabi; Samira Hassanpour; Masoud Delkhah; Shahrokh Estakhri; Melika Sharifinia; Sara Najafi; Sirus Hemmati; Afsaneh Naseri; Azadeh Riazi
- Ending theme: Mohammad Esfahani
- Composer: Masoud Sekhavatdoust
- Country of origin: Iran
- Original language: Persian
- No. of seasons: 3
- No. of episodes: 60

Production
- Producer: Iraj Mohammadi
- Production location: Tehran
- Editors: Manouchehr Sanei; Movahed Shadroo
- Running time: 45–50 minutes

Original release
- Network: IRIB TV3 iFilm
- Release: 4 August – 4 November 2018

Lovers (Persian: دلدادگان;Deldadegan) is a 2018 Iranian drama, romance TV series directed by Manouchehr Hadi.

== About the series ==
Initially, it was supposed to be broadcast on IRIB Tehran after production, But after a while, this decision changed and IRIB TV3 took over broadcasting the series. This series has also been rebroadcast on the iFilm network.

The script for the final episode of the series was changed due to the non-cooperation of Pantea Bahram, who plays Afsaneh Meshkat, which was met with a wave of criticism from the audience. On Pantea Bahram's Instagram page, the reason for her non-cooperation is stated to be financial issues.

Referring to the problem that arose with the final episode of the series "Lovers," cinema and television critic Hossein Soltan Mohammadi said that this problem could have been fixed, but the crew made no effort to manage the problem that arose.

== Storyline ==
An ambitious girl full of far-reaching dreams named Farzaneh Zandi (Linda Kiani) first falls in love with a simple and ignorant young man named Malek Poursalim (Arash Majidi). As the story continues, Malek accidentally meets a revolutionary group and collaborates with them. At the same time, another young man named Nader Soleimanpour (Hamid Goodarzi), who apparently owns a pastry shop but is actually a security element affiliated with SAVAK, enters the place and he falls in love with Farzaneh. In order to get Farzaneh, Nader betrays Malek to SAVAK, and after being arrested, he is exiled to Sistan. Farzaneh, who is disappointed with Malek's return, gives up on Malek to satisfy her own ambitions and accepts Nader's love and marries him. But Marzieh (Samira Hassanpour), Farzaneh's friend who initially doesn't like Malek's personality and she asks Farzaneh not to marry Malek, After she realizes that Malek is a revolutionary, she gradually becomes interested in him and marries him....

== Cast ==
- Arash Majidi
- Linda Kiani
- Hamid Goodarzi
- Masoud Rayegan
- Pantea Bahram
- Mehraneh Mahin Torabi
- Samira Hassanpour
- Masoud Delkhah
- Shahrokh Estakhri
- Melika Sharifinia
- Sara Najafi
- Sirus Hemmati
- Afsaneh Naseri
- Azadeh Riazi
- Afsaneh Chehrehazad
- Mehdi Sabaei
- Behshad Sharifian
- Alireza Ostadi
- Roya Mirelmi
- Asghar Mohebbi
- Manouchehr Hadi
- Pooya Amini
- Majid Potki
- Masoud Forootan
- Hossein Dalman
- Abolfazl Soltani
- Masoud Choobin
- Mehdi Miri
- Ehsan Monfared
- Ali Ebadi
- Behnaz Pourfallah
- Hamid Azad
- Saeed Nemati

== Awards ==
Year	Award	Category	Recipient	Result
2019	Hafez Awards	Best TV series	Iraj Mohammadi	Nominated
2019	Hafez Awards	Best TV series Director	Manouchehr Hadi	Nominated
2019	Hafez Awards	Best Screenplay	Babak Kaydan and Mehdi Mohammad-Nejadian	Nominated
