= Khaydalu =

City in ancient Elam civilization

- Location: Khorramabad, Lorestan Province, Iran
- Part of: Elam

Ancient civilization of Elam

Khaydalu was a city in ancient Elam civilization. Some scholars believe that the city was located where modern day Khorramabad is. In 640 BC, Ashurbanipal, the king of the Neo-Assyrian Empire, conquered Elam and destroyed Khaydalu. Afterwards, the city became a part of Assyria. In the Sasanian Empire the city named Shapur Khast was built upon where Khaydalu once was.

== See also ==
- Ancient Near East
- Prehistory of Iran
- Kassites
