= Khorramabad Airport =

Khorramabad Airport فرودگاه خرم‌آباد
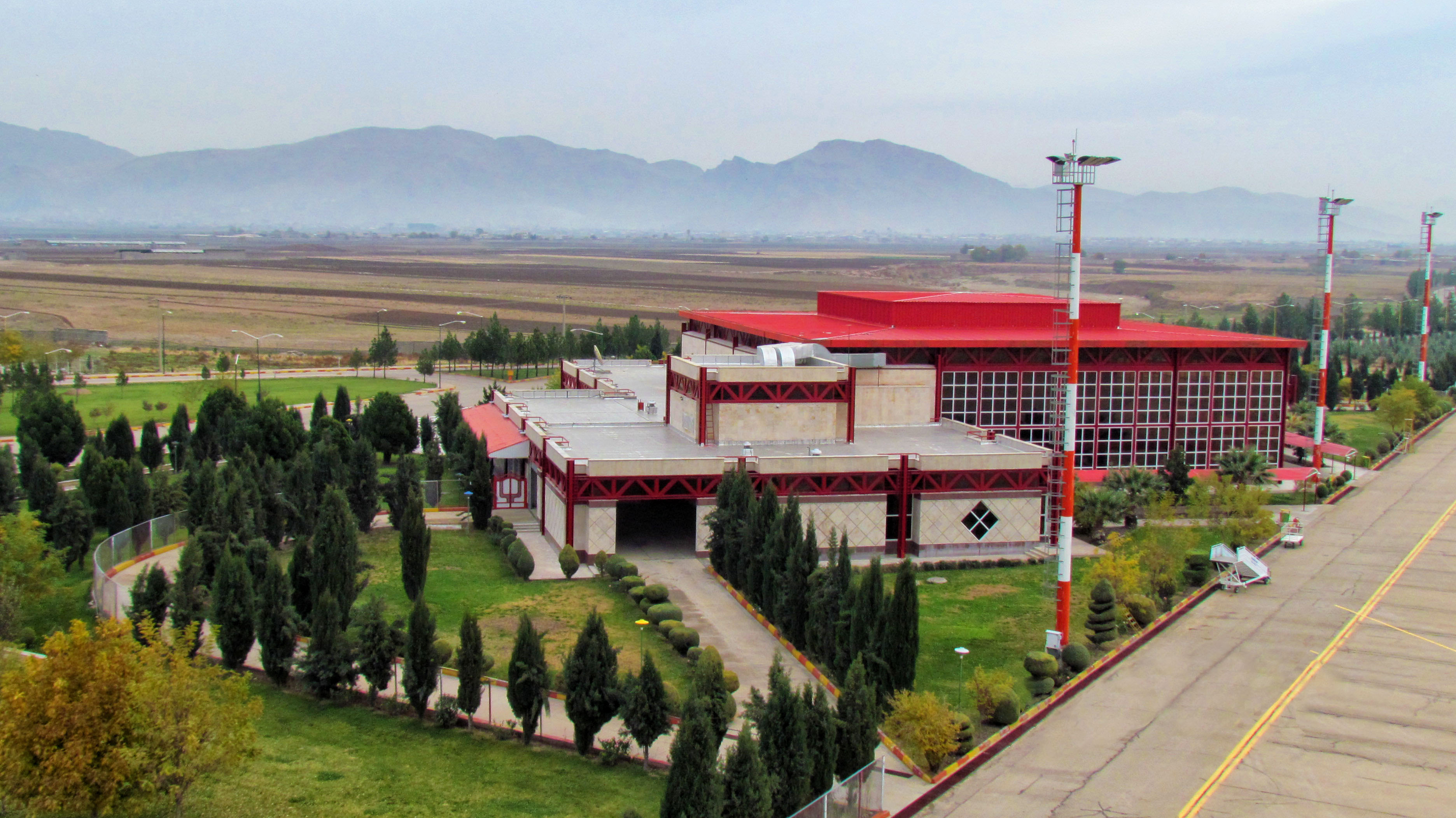
- Terminal building
- IATA: KHD; ICAO: OICK

Summary
- Airport type: Public
- Owner: Government of Iran
- Operator: Iran Airports Company
- Serves: Khorramabad
- Location: Khorramabad, Lorestan, Iran
- Elevation AMSL: 1,153 m (3,783 ft)
- Coordinates: 33°26′09″N 48°16′54″E
- Website: http://khoramabad.airport.ir/

Map
- Location of airport in Iran

Runways
Direction	Length		Surface
Direction	m	ft	Surface
11/29	3,600	10,498	Asphalt
- Source: World Aero Data

Khorramabad International Airport (IATA: KHD, ICAO: OICK) is an airport in Khorramabad, Iran.

== Airlines and destinations ==
Airlines	Destinations
Caspian Airlines	Mashhad
Chabahar Airlines	Tehran–Mehrabad
Iran Air	Tehran–Mehrabad
Mahan Air	Tehran–Mehrabad
