= Golchehreh =

2011 film

- Directed by: Vahid Mousaian
- Written by: Vahid Mousaian
- Produced by: Vahid Mousaian
- Starring: Masoud Rayegan; Ladan Mostofi
- Cinematography: Hooman Behmanesh
- Edited by: Nazanin Mofakham
- Music by: Fereydun Shahbazian
- Release date: 2011
- Running time: 105 minutes
- Country: Iran
- Language: Persian

Golchehreh is a 2011 Iranian drama film directed by Vahid Mousaian. Golchehreh is based on a true story about the Taliban in Afghanistan and how they tried to destroy their National Film Archive and closing the cinemas.

== Cast ==
- Masoud Rayegan as Ashraf Khan
- Ladan Mostofi as Rokhsareh
- Afshin Hashemi as Salar
- Hedayat Hashemi as Goudarz
- Hossein Moheb Ahari
