= Falak-ol-Aflak =

Castle in Khorramabad, Iran

Shapur Khast
- دژ شاپورخواست
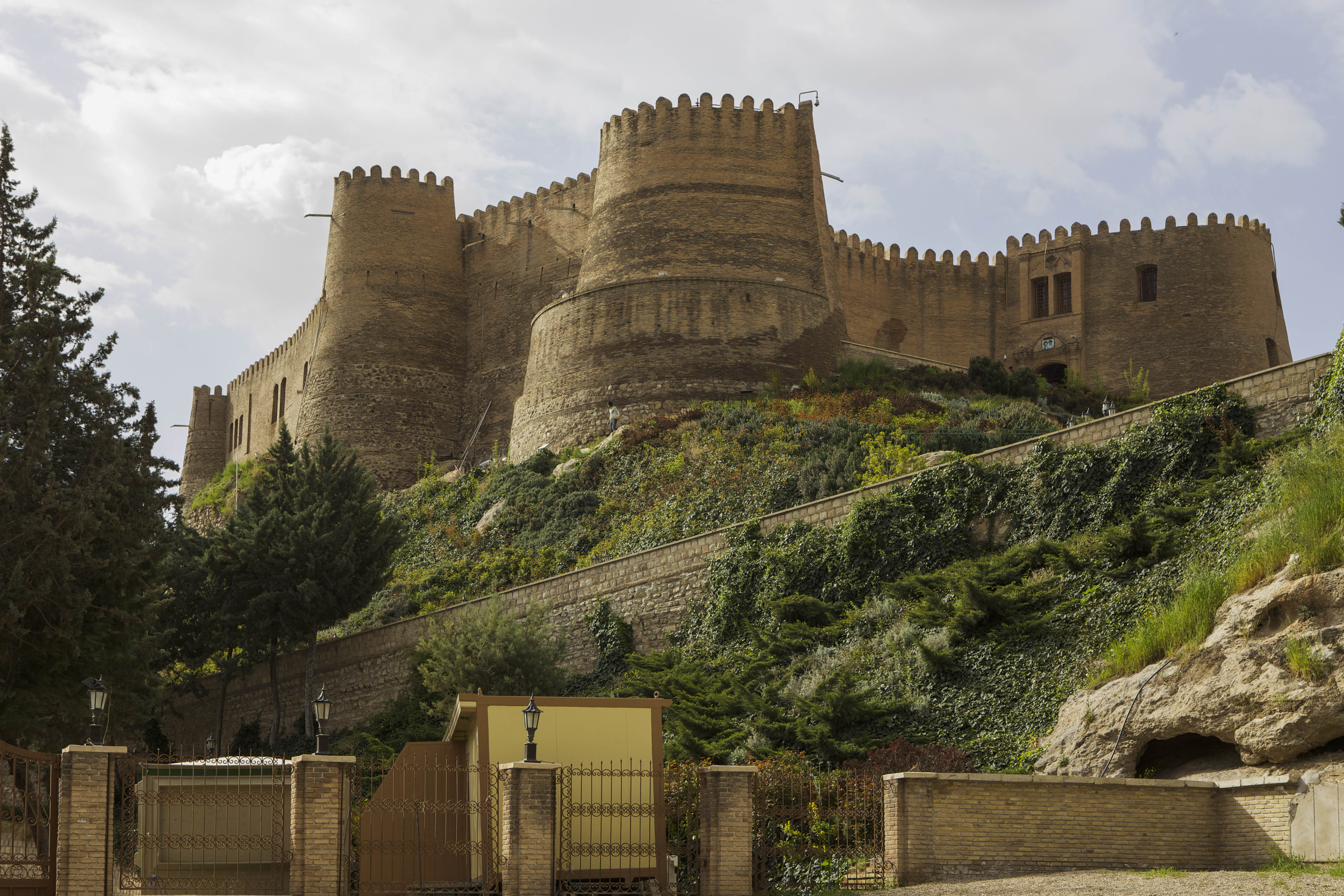

- Location within Iran

General information
- Type: Fortress
- Architectural style: Sasanian
- Location: Khorramabad, Lorestan province, Iran
- Coordinates: 33.4837°N 48.3534°E
- Estimated completion: Sasanian era (224–651)

Falak ol-Aflak (Persian: فلک الافلاک, lit. 'The Sky of the Skies') or Shapur Khast Castle (Persian: دژ شاپورخواست) is a castle situated on the top of a large hill with the same name within the city of Khorramabad, the regional capital of Lorestan province, Iran. This gigantic structure was built during the Sasanian era (224–651).

The Khorramabad River runs past the eastern and south-western side of the Falak-ol-Aflak hill providing the fortress some natural protection on those sides. Today, the western and northern sides of the hill are bordered by the residential districts of Khorramabad.

== History ==
During the Pahlavi era, after being used as a prison until 1968, it was transformed into a museum complex.

== Architectural layout ==
The foundations of the actual castle measure approximately 300 by 400 metres (980 ft × 1,310 ft). The height of the entire structure, including the hill, reaches up to 40 meters above the surrounding area.

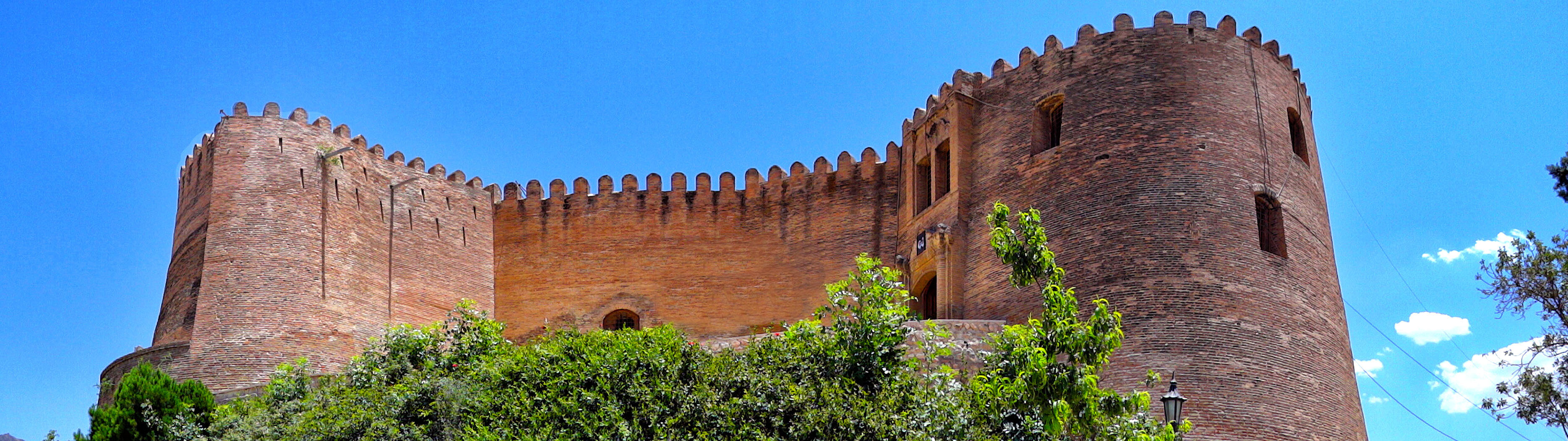
Panorama of Falak ol-aflak Castle

=== Surrounding structures ===
Archaeological studies have identified the existence of a two layered rampart with twelve towers around the present day construction. From the twelve original towers, only two remain and these are situated northwest and southwest of the existing fortress.

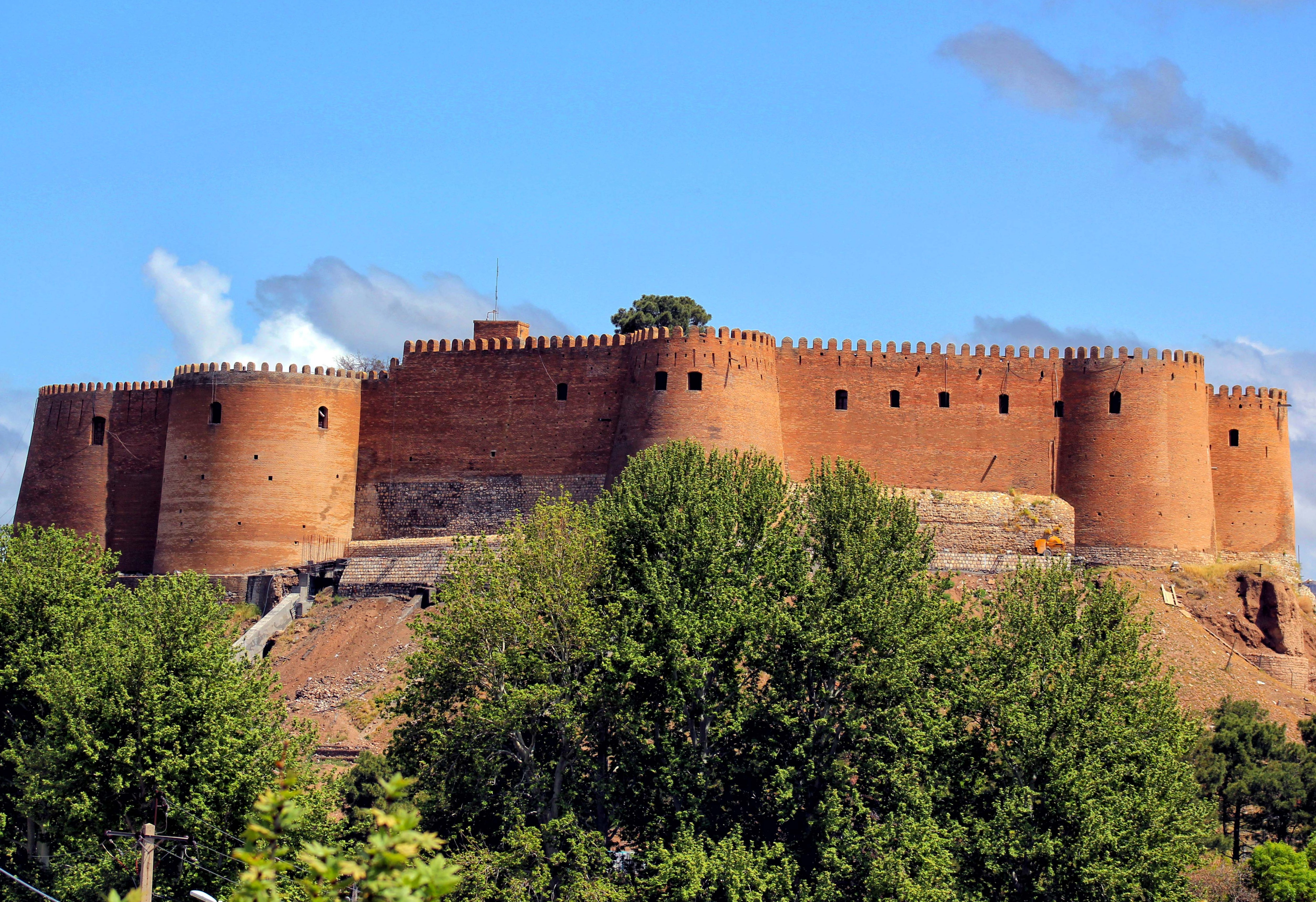
Falak ol-aflak castle, central Khorramabad

=== Dehumidifier ===
Falak ol-Aflak castle is made with different materials like stone and wood that are vulnerable to humidity. That is why the castle was built on the highest point of the city of Khorramabad, so that the wind could penetrate the building and dry its foundations.

== Current status ==
The castle is managed by the Iran Cultural Heritage Organisation and is a protected site. During the 2026 Iran war, the castle received structural damage from US strikes. On 8 March 2026, strikes on the castle damaged several sections of the site, destroyed its museum, and injured five museum workers. The castle was attacked despite being marked with a blue shield emblem, in violation of the Hague Convention.

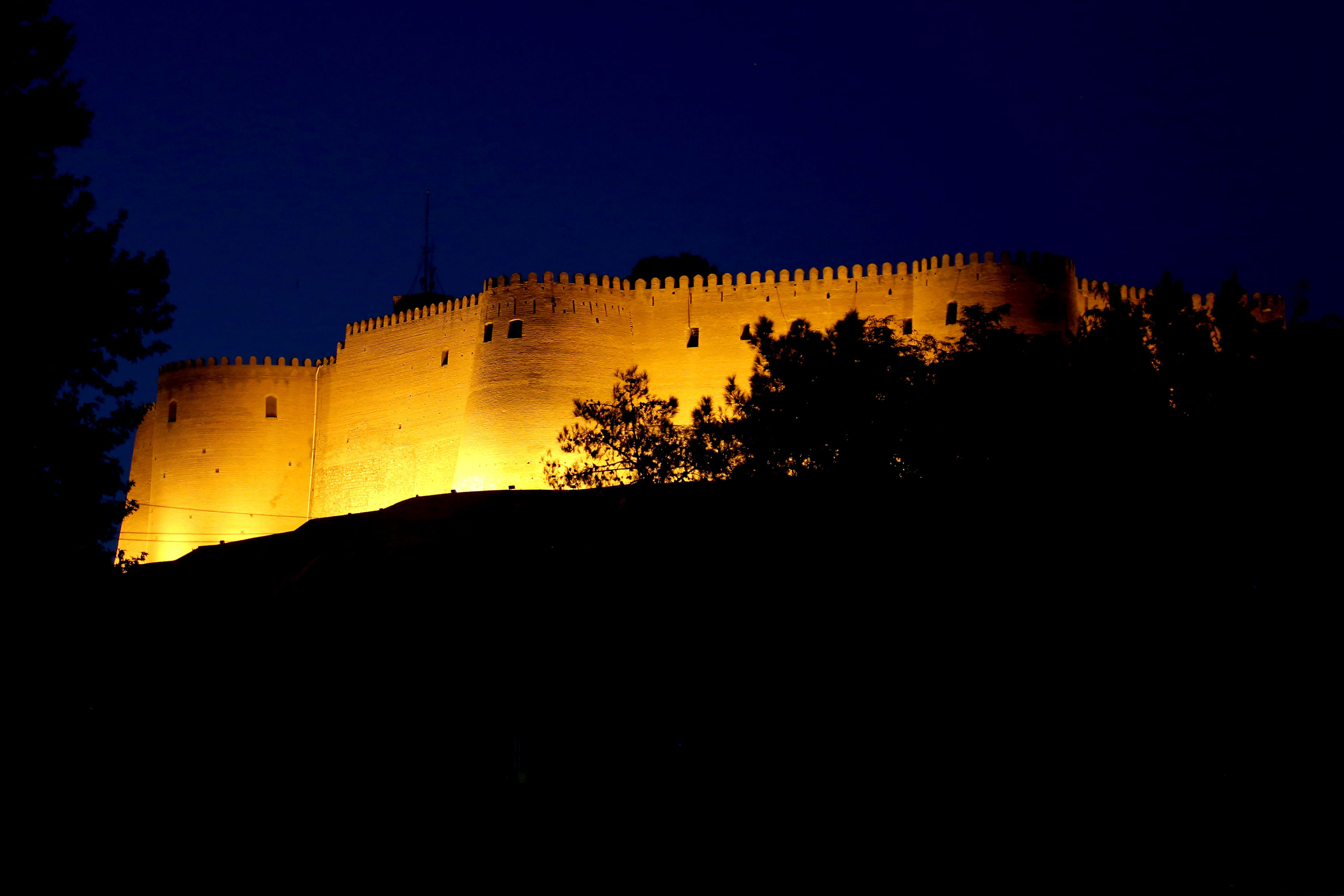
Falak Aflak Castle

== See also ==
- Iranian architecture
- List of castles in Iran
- Sasanian architecture
- Shapur Khast
