= Shapuri Bridge =

Sasanian era bridge in Khorramabad, Iran

Shapuri Bridge پل اشکسه
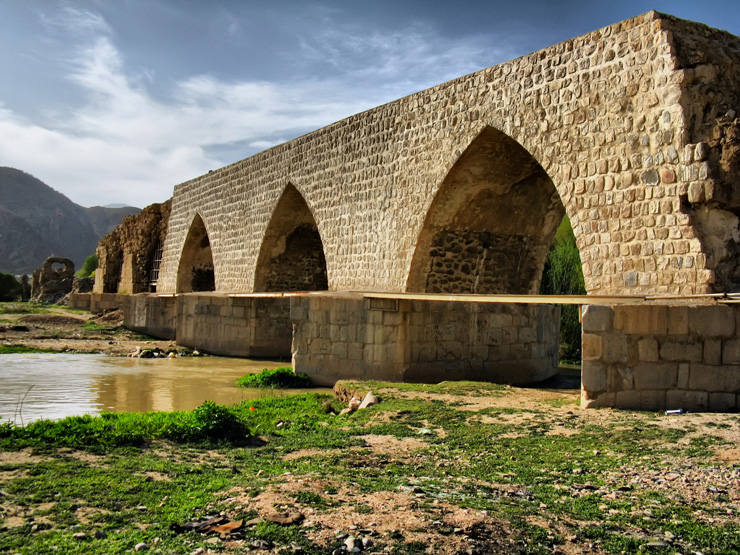
- Coordinates: 33.468108°N 48.338663°E
- Locale: Khorramabad, Lorestan province, Iran
- Other name(s): Broken bridge

Characteristics
- Total length: 312
- Height: 10.75

History
- Construction end: Sasanian era

Shapuri Bridge (Persian: پل شاپوری) or Broken Bridge (Persian: پل شکسته) (in Luri: طاقِ پیلِ اِشکِسَه) is a Sasanian era historic bridge south of Khorramabad, Lorestan province, Iran. The bridge has 28 arches, of which only 6 remain, and 27 Pile bridges, each 61 square meters; five of its arches are intact and the others have been destroyed by natural factors. The arches of the bridge have been constructed of stone, whereas the bridge itself is a mixture of stone and mortar. Shapoori Bridge is registered on the list of National Monuments.
