= Majid Gharizadeh =

Iranian filmmaker

Majid Gharizadeh is an Iranian filmmaker. He won the Crystal Simorgh for writing the script of his directorial debut The Grandfather (1985). Other films include:

- Good friends (2015)
- Brick Boys (2006)
- Youth (1998)
- Today's Woman (1996)
- Restless (1994)
- Shaghayegh (1991)
- My daughter Sahar (1989)
- Land of Wishes (1987)
