= Masoud Forootan =

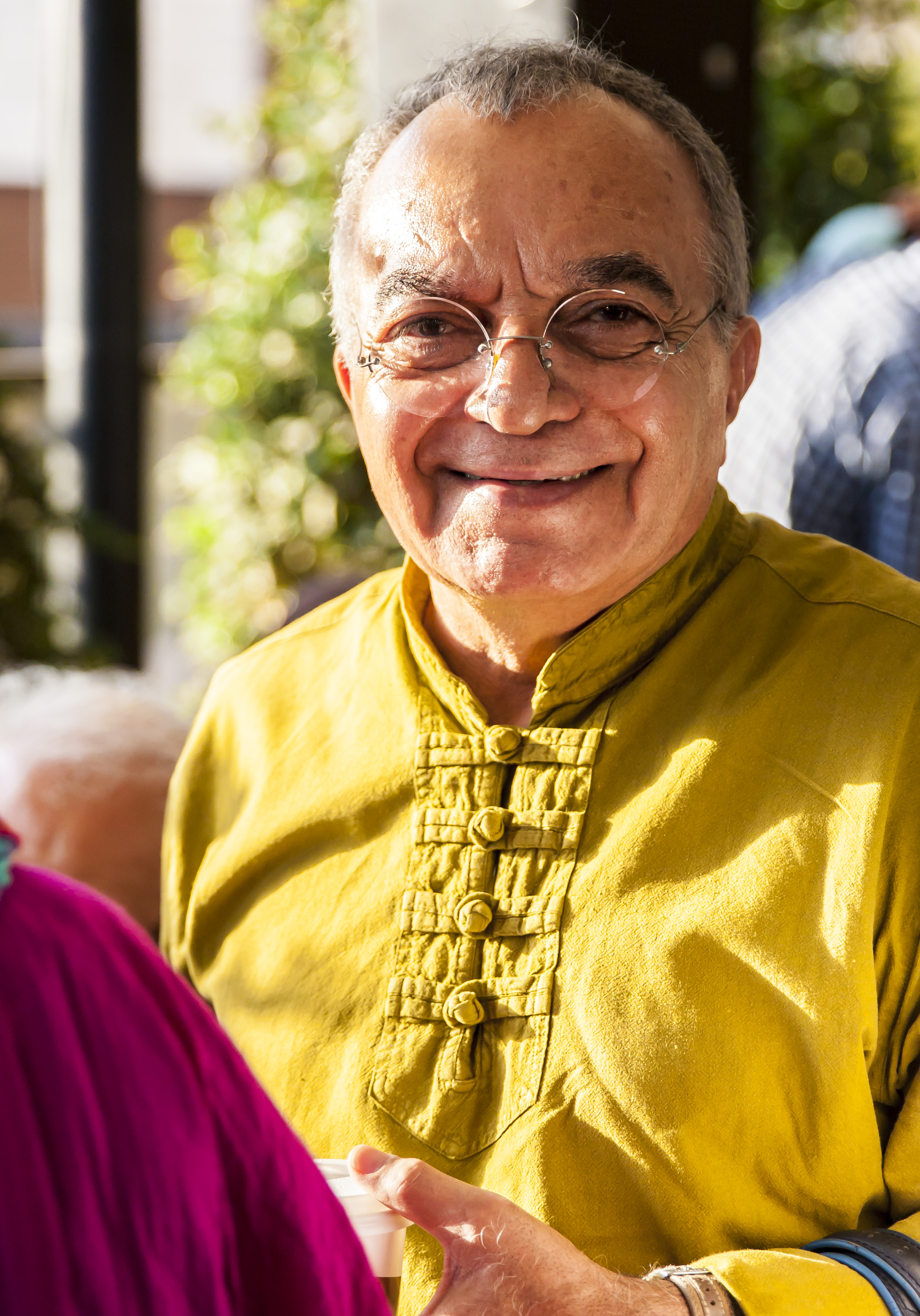
- At the unveiling ceremony of IGHE3
- Born: Masoud Forootan Larijani; February 21, 1946 (age 80); Amol, Pahlavi Iran
- Education: BA in Film Directing
- Alma mater: Iran Broadcasting University; Cinema and theater faculty of Tehran Art University
- Occupations: Author, television presenter, television director, actor
- Years active: 1976–present
- Notable work: Lovers (TV series); Yadegari; Masal Abad; Sultan and Berger; Persian traditional music Shab Kook
- Spouse: Simin Hashemi (divorce)

Masoud Forootan (Persian: مسعود فروتن; born February 21, 1946) is an Iranian author, television director, television presenter and actor.

== Life ==
Forootan studied at the Faculty of Dramatic Arts.
