= Roya Teymourian =

Iranian actress (born 1959)

- رویا تیموریان
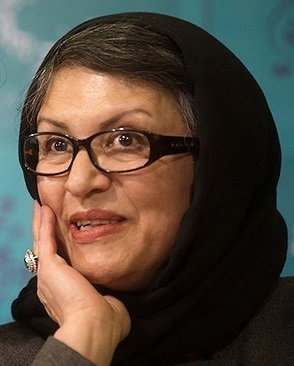
- Born: March 19, 1959 (age 67); Tehran, Iran
- Occupation: Actress
- Years active: 1981–present
- Spouse(s): Mirvaliollah Madani (div. 2003) Masoud Rayegan (m. 2003)
- Children: 2

Signature
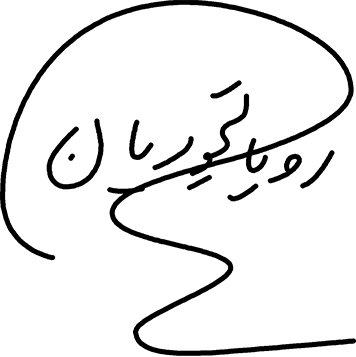

Roya Teymourian (Persian: رویا تیموریان, born 19 March 1959 in Tehran) is an Iranian actress.

== Selected filmography ==
=== Film ===
- Women's Prison
- Gharch-e Sammi
- Beed-e Majnoon (The Willow Tree, by Majid Majidi)
- Kafe Setereh
- Good to Be Back
- Polaris
- Conjugal Visit
- Leather Jacket

=== TV Film ===
- Love in Persian

=== TV Series ===
- Jeyran (TV series)
- Tenth Night
- Madare sefr darajeh (Zero Degree Turn)
- Saate Sheni (sand clock)
- Shamsolemareh
- The Recall
