= Khorramabad =

Regional capital of Lorestan province, Iran

Khorramabad خۉرمۊه (Northern Luri) خرم‌آباد (Persian)
- City
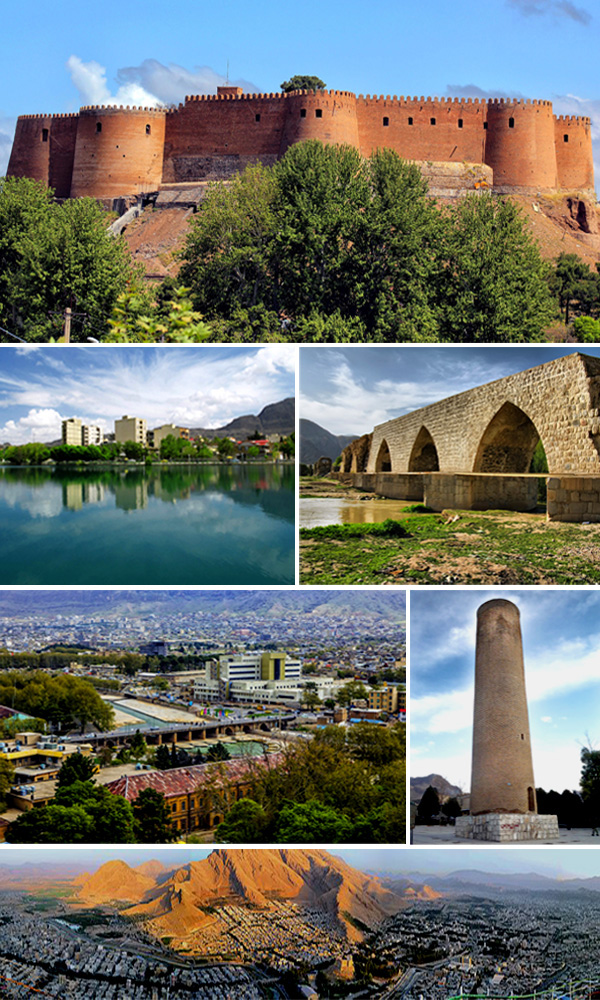
- Montage of Khorramabad, clockwise: Falak-ol-Aflak, Keeyow Lake, Shapuri Bridge, view of Khorramabad, Brick Minaret, panorama of Khorramabad

- Seal

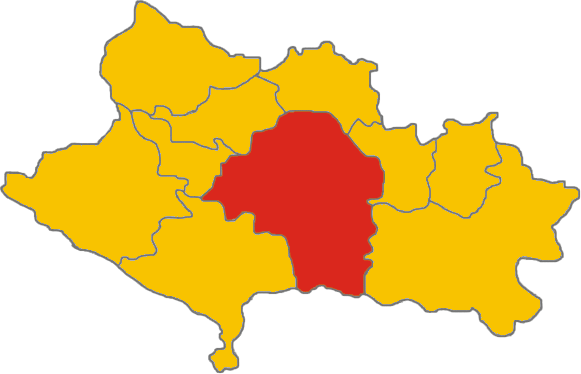
- The territory of the Khorramabad inside the province of Luristan

- Location within Iran
- Coordinates: 33°29′15″N 48°21′22″E
- Country: Iran
- Province: Luristan
- County: Khorramabad
- District: Central

Government
  - Mayor: Daryush Barani Beyranvand
- Elevation: 1,147 m (3,763 ft)

Population (2016)
  - Total: 373,416
- Time zone: UTC+3:30 (IRST)
- Climate: Csa
- Website: www.Khorramabad.ir

Khorramabad (Persian: خرم‌آباد; [xorræmɒːˈbɒːd]; Northern Luri: خۉرمۊه, Northern Luri pronunciation: [xoɾˈmʉ.æ]) (Note: Also romanized as Khoramabad, Khorram Abad, Khorramābād, and Xorramâbâd; also known as Khur Ramābād, Khurramabad, and Xurremabad) is a city in the Central District of Khorramabad County, Lorestan province, Iran, serving as capital of the province, the county, and the district. Situated in a scenic valley surrounded by mountains, the city lies approximately 100 kilometers (about 62 miles) east of the Iraqi border.

The population of Khorramabad consists of Lurs and Laks, who speak Luri and Laki languages respectively.

== Etymology ==
The name Khorramabad (Persian: خرم‌آباد) is a classical Persian compound composed of khorram (خرم, "flourishing" or "pleasant") and the suffix -ābād (ـآباد, "cultivated settlement"), translating to "Pleasant Abode" or "Flourishing City."

The native Northern Luri name for the city, Khormuah (Northern Luri: خۉرمۊه) are regional phonetic adaptations of the formal Persian name Khorramabad. These localized toponyms developed through standard Western Iranian sound shifts, specifically the lenition (softening) of the intervocalic plosive /b/ into the semivowel /w/, alongside the apocope (dropping) of the final dental stop /d/. While the Laki form retains the distinct medial syllable, the Northern Luri variant exhibits further vowel rounding and contraction, fusing the elements into the localized locative ending -muah (ـمۊه).

A popular modern folk etymology, primarily found in regional journalism, instead interprets the native name as a compound of xor (خور, "sun") and muah (مۊه, "to set" or "to become"), poetically rendering it as "the place where the sun sets" due to the city's deep valley landscape.

== History ==
=== Prehistoric sites ===
The Khorramabad Valley, a UNESCO World Heritage Site, contains evidences from the Middle to Upper Palaeolithic periods with remains of Mousterian and Baradostian cultures. Systematic excavations in the valley, notably led by Frank Hole, identified key cave sites such as Yafteh, Kunji, and Gar Arjeneh. These locations yielded distinct Upper Paleolithic Baradostian blade industries with radiocarbon dates ranging between 32,000 and 38,000 years ago, serving as primary material for studying the regional transition from Neanderthals to anatomically modern humans.

=== Antiquity and Elamite period ===
During the Neo-Elamite period, the geographic area of modern Khorramabad is widely identified by historians and archaeologists as the location of the ancient city of Khaydalu (also spelled Khaidalu or Haydalu). The settlement functioned as a vital strategic highland fortress defending the northern approaches of the Elamite kingdom. It was eventually captured and plundered by the Assyrian monarch Ashurbanipal during his devastating military campaigns against Elam between 647 and 646 BCE.

=== Sasanian period ===
The formal urban planning and foundation of the city occurred under the Sasanian Empire, when it was established under the name Shapurkhwast, meaning "Shapur's Desire." Founded or significantly fortified by Shapur I (or expanded later by Shapur II), the city served as a major military and commercial junction within the Jibal province. During this era, Sasanian engineers laid the stone and brick foundations of the central citadel—which would later become known as Falak-ol-Aflak Castle—on a large rocky outcrop. The fortress was engineered as an unassailable stronghold, featuring thick defensive ramparts and a 50-meter-deep water well carved directly into the solid bedrock to survive prolonged sieges. To support this vital military hub and secure regional trade routes, builders also constructed the monumental Shapuri Bridge south of the fortress to span the valley floor and withstand seasonal flooding across the Khorram-Rud River.

=== Hazaraspids ===
The founder of the Hazaraspid dynasty was Abu Tahir ibn Muhammad, a descendant of the Shabankara chieftain Fadluya. Fadluya was initially a commander of the Salghurids of Fars and was appointed governor of Kuhgiluya, but eventually gained independence in Luristan and extended his realm as far as Isfahan. Following this era, Khorramabad developed into the formal capital of the independent Atabegs of Little Luristan (Lor-e Kuček), who ruled the region from 1184 to 1596. The town suffered almost total destruction during successive Mongol and Timurid invasions in the 13th and 14th centuries, which forced the surviving local population to relocate and permanently consolidate the urban center at the immediate base of the valley's central monolithic fortress rock.

=== Safavid era ===
During the Safavid era, Khorramabad was the administrative center of the velayat (semi-autonomous province) of Lorestan. This permanent integration into the centralized imperial state occurred in 1006 AH (1597–1598 CE) when Shah Abbas I executed Shahverdi Khan, the final independent ruler of the Khorshidi Atabeg dynasty, subsequently replacing the local line with a centrally appointed governor (vāli). Shah Abbas appointed Huseyn Khan Solvizi (Feyli) as the first of these new hereditary viceroys, and Khorramabad functioned as the political and military seat for the Walis of Lorestan. During this campaign, Safavid forces seized the valley's central citadel—frequently referred to in historical travelogues as the Bala Hissar (present-day Falak-ol-Aflak Castle)—which featured 22.5-meter-high defensive walls, eight mighty towers, and a 50-meter-deep water well cut into the solid bedrock, having long been regarded as an impregnable obstacle to regional aggressors. Historical surveys track the ancient landscape surrounding this fortress core during the period, documenting the historic Shapuri Bridge with its twenty-eight stone arches spanning the river, as well as the remnants of a quadrangular brick tower featuring a Naskh inscription dated to 1123 CE.

In the wake of the demise of the Safavids, after the signing of the Treaty of Constantinople (1724) with Imperial Russia, the Ottoman Turks conquered Khorramabad on the 6 September 1725.

=== Qajar and modern eras ===
Following the brief Ottoman occupation, Khorramabad was recaptured and restored to Persian sovereignty under Nader Shah Afshar. By the rise of the Qajar dynasty in the late 18th century, the city solidified its role as a premier military stronghold and regional center for southwestern Iran. During the 19th century, Qajar governors heavily renovated and expanded the central fortress complex, officially renaming it Falak-ol-Aflak ("Sky of Skies"), where it functioned as a garrison and a provincial gubernatorial seat. Throughout the 20th century, the city expanded rapidly beyond its medieval footprint, modernizing its municipal infrastructure while retaining its role as the official capital of modern Lorestan Province.

== Demographics ==
=== Language ===
The city population is predominantly Lur and the largest Luri-speaking city in the country.

The linguistic composition of the city:

{{bar percent|

Khorramabad linguistic composition (2022)
Language	percent
Luri	70%
Laki	25%
Silakhori	5%

=== Population ===
At the time of the 2006 National Census, the city's population was 328,544 in 75,945 households. The following census in 2011 counted 348,216 people in 94,747 households. The 2016 census measured the population of the city as 373,416 people in 109,231 households.

== Geography ==
Khorramabad is in the Zagros Mountains. Khorramabad Airport is 3 km south of the city proper.

=== Climate ===
Khorramabad has a mild and semi-humid Mediterranean climate with high amounts of rainfall during spring and winter. It is the sixth cities in Iran having high level of annual rainfall.

Khorramabad has what is classed under the Köppen climate classification as a Hot-summer Mediterranean climate (Csa) climate. Its elevation is 1147.8 above sea level. Average annual precipitation is 511.06 and its average annual temperature is 17.21 Celsius.

Highest recorded temperature: 47.0 °C (116.6 °F) on 14 August 1960 and 23 July 1961
Lowest recorded temperature: −14.6 °C (5.7 °F) on 25 January 1990.

Climate data for Khorramabad (1991–2020, extremes 1951-2020)
Month	Jan	Feb	Mar	Apr	May	Jun	Jul	Aug	Sep	Oct	Nov	Dec	Year
Record high °C (°F)	24.0 (75.2)	26.0 (78.8)	31.0 (87.8)	37.0 (98.6)	41.0 (105.8)	45.0 (113.0)	47.0 (116.6)	47.0 (116.6)	43.0 (109.4)	37.0 (98.6)	34.0 (93.2)	25.6 (78.1)	47.0 (116.6)
Mean daily maximum °C (°F)	11.0 (51.8)	13.3 (55.9)	17.6 (63.7)	22.7 (72.9)	29.2 (84.6)	36.3 (97.3)	39.8 (103.6)	39.6 (103.3)	34.9 (94.8)	27.7 (81.9)	18.5 (65.3)	13.0 (55.4)	25.3 (77.5)
Daily mean °C (°F)	4.5 (40.1)	6.5 (43.7)	10.4 (50.7)	15.0 (59.0)	20.7 (69.3)	26.9 (80.4)	30.4 (86.7)	29.8 (85.6)	24.8 (76.6)	18.5 (65.3)	10.8 (51.4)	6.3 (43.3)	17.1 (62.7)
Mean daily minimum °C (°F)	−0.9 (30.4)	0.6 (33.1)	3.6 (38.5)	7.5 (45.5)	11.5 (52.7)	15.7 (60.3)	19.6 (67.3)	18.9 (66.0)	14.0 (57.2)	9.8 (49.6)	4.4 (39.9)	0.8 (33.4)	8.8 (47.8)
Record low °C (°F)	−14.6 (5.7)	−11.5 (11.3)	−11.0 (12.2)	−7.0 (19.4)	−1.8 (28.8)	7.0 (44.6)	9.2 (48.6)	8.0 (46.4)	4.6 (40.3)	−1.4 (29.5)	−7.8 (18.0)	−12.0 (10.4)	−14.6 (5.7)
Average precipitation mm (inches)	70.3 (2.77)	67.8 (2.67)	84.1 (3.31)	74.7 (2.94)	21.6 (0.85)	1.4 (0.06)	0.3 (0.01)	0.2 (0.01)	1.3 (0.05)	29.3 (1.15)	62.9 (2.48)	79.1 (3.11)	493 (19.41)
Average precipitation days (≥ 1.0 mm)	7.4	7	7.5	7.4	3.4	0.3	0.1	0	0.2	3	6	7	49.3
Average rainy days	10.9	9.9	11.9	11.3	5.2	0.4	0.2	0.1	0.3	4.5	9.5	10.7	74.9
Average snowy days	2.6	1.5	0.7	0	0	0	0	0	0	0	0.1	0.9	5.8
Average relative humidity (%)	68	62	56	56	43	24	21	20	23	37	60	68	44.8
Average dew point °C (°F)	−1.5 (29.3)	−1.3 (29.7)	0.5 (32.9)	4.8 (40.6)	5.1 (41.2)	2.2 (36.0)	3.4 (38.1)	2.8 (37.0)	0.3 (32.5)	1.2 (34.2)	2.0 (35.6)	0.0 (32.0)	1.6 (34.9)
Mean monthly sunshine hours	174	181	213	230	286	346	344	343	309	260	197	170	3,053
Source 1: NCEI
Source 2: (records, snow/sleet days 1955-2010)

== Historical monuments ==
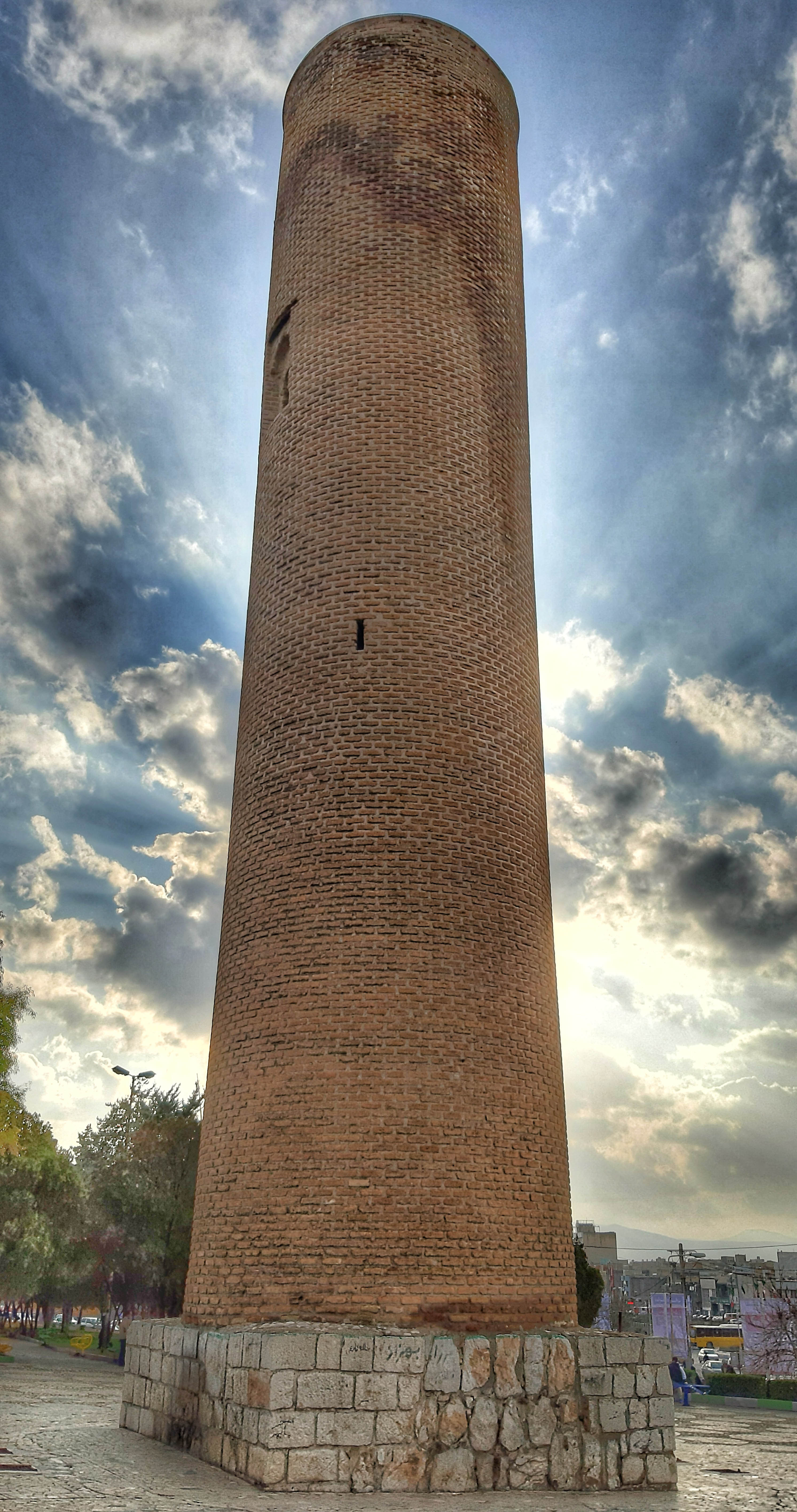
Brick Minaret of Khorramabad

=== Brick minaret ===
The Brick Minaret is a cylindrical brick tower from the Seljuk and Buyid eras located inside the ancient city of Shapur Khast, south of Khorramabad.

This minaret is a combination of the Indian Stupa, commemorative columns, and the Central Asian tradition of tower building for defensive and communication purposes.

=== Sahpuri Bridge ===
Shapuri Bridge dates back to the Sasanian era and is registered on the list of National Monuments.

=== Masur Tepe ===
Masur Tepe is a major archeological site in the south of Khorramabad, with layers extending from the Neolithic to the Islamic periods.

== Attractions ==
Khorramabad is a major tourist destination and possesses several attractions, such as five Paleolithic cave-dwelling sites which were recognised in 2025 as World Heritage Sites by UNESCO.

== Colleges and universities ==
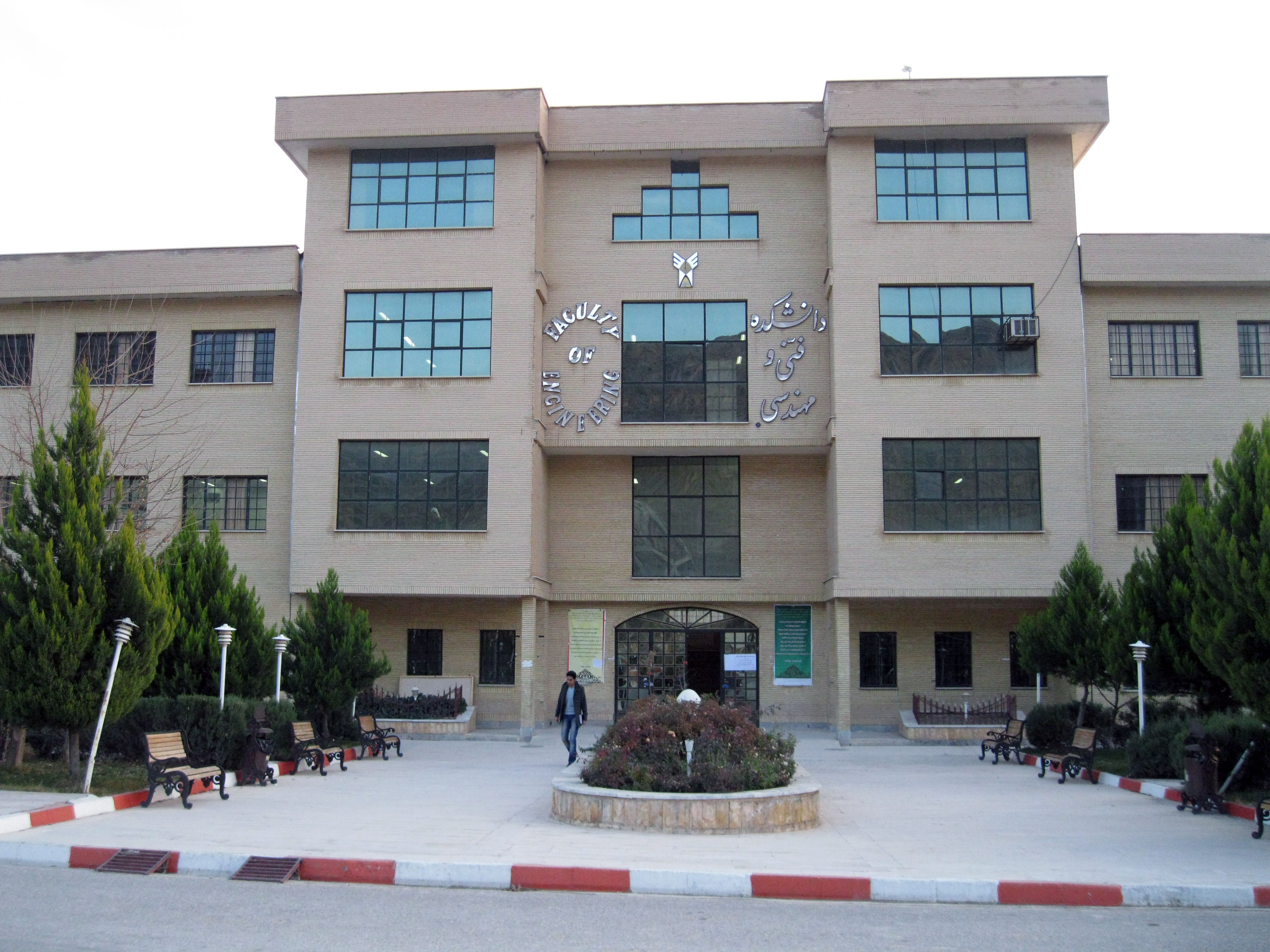
Islamic Azad University of Khorramabad

- Islamic Azad University of Khorram Abad
- Luristan University
- Luristan University of Medical Sciences
- Madanni Technical College

== Sister cities and twin towns ==
Country		City	State / Province / Region / Governorate	Date	
(Turkey)	Turkey	Afyonkarahisar	Afyonkarahisar Province	2015	
(Japan)	Japan	Yamagata	Yamagata Prefecture	October 2013	December 2020

== Photo gallery ==
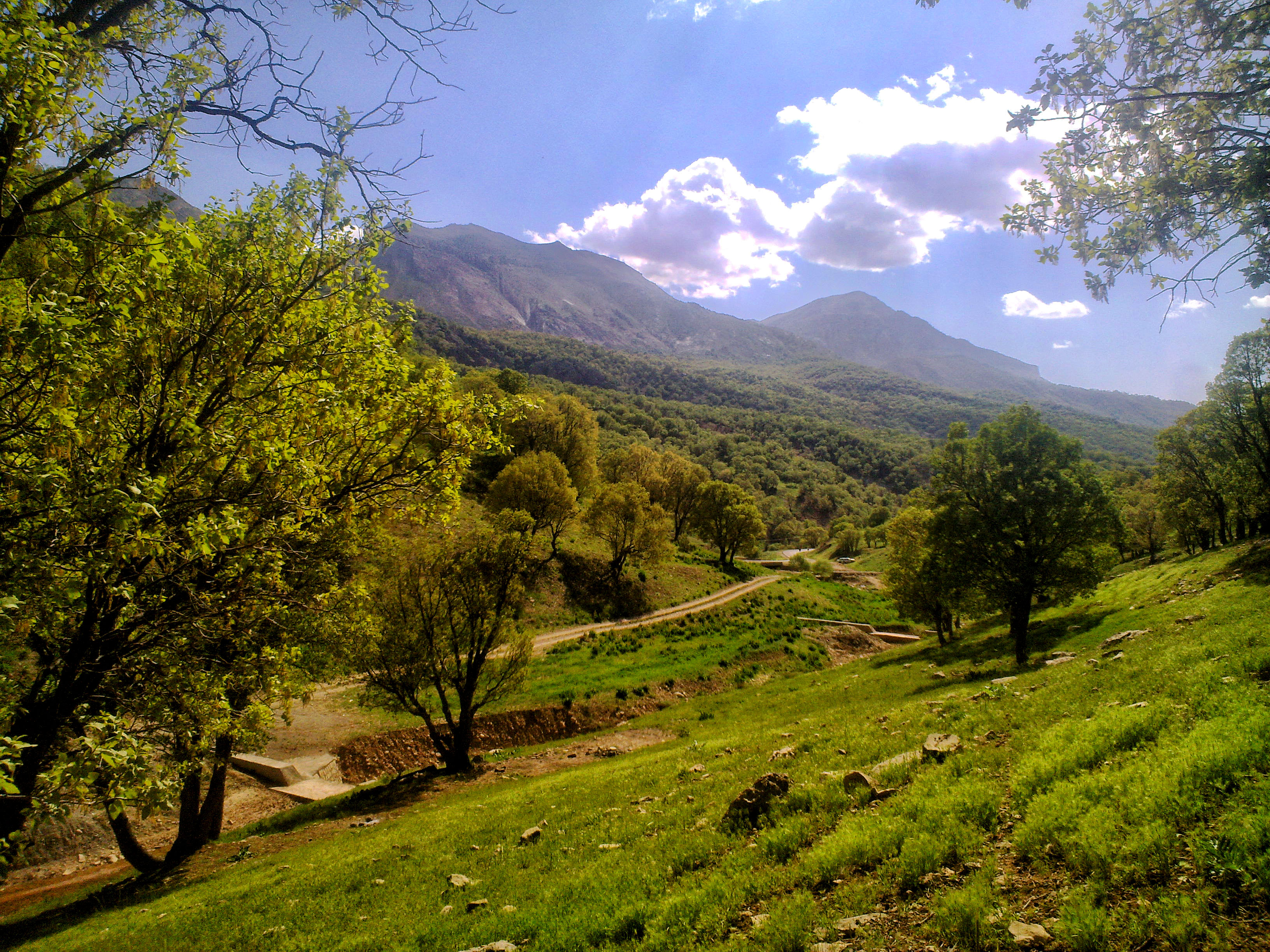
Nojian oak forest, Khorramabad County

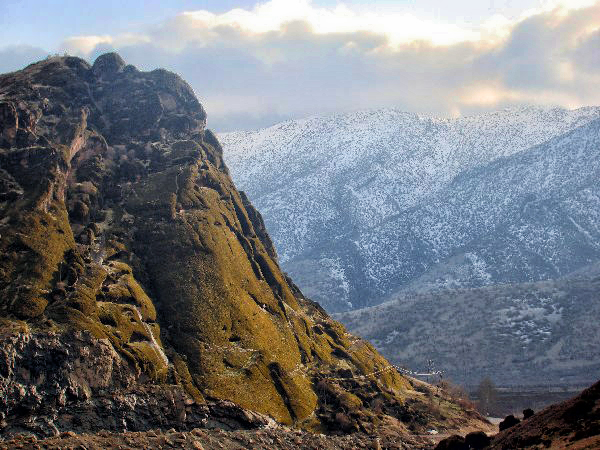
Makhmalkuh Khorramabad County

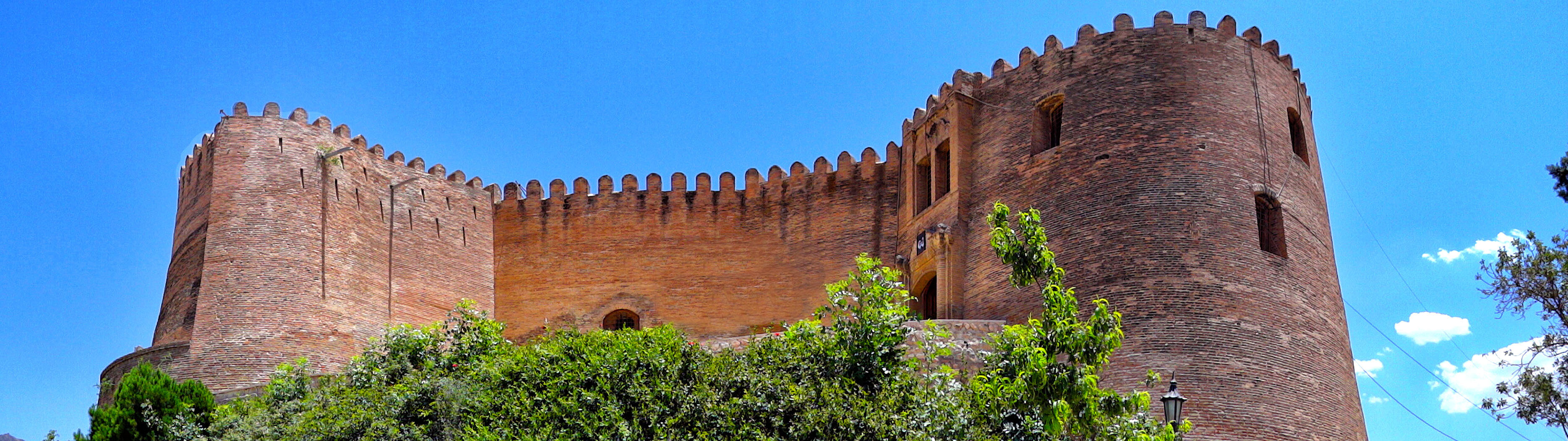
Shapur Khast castle

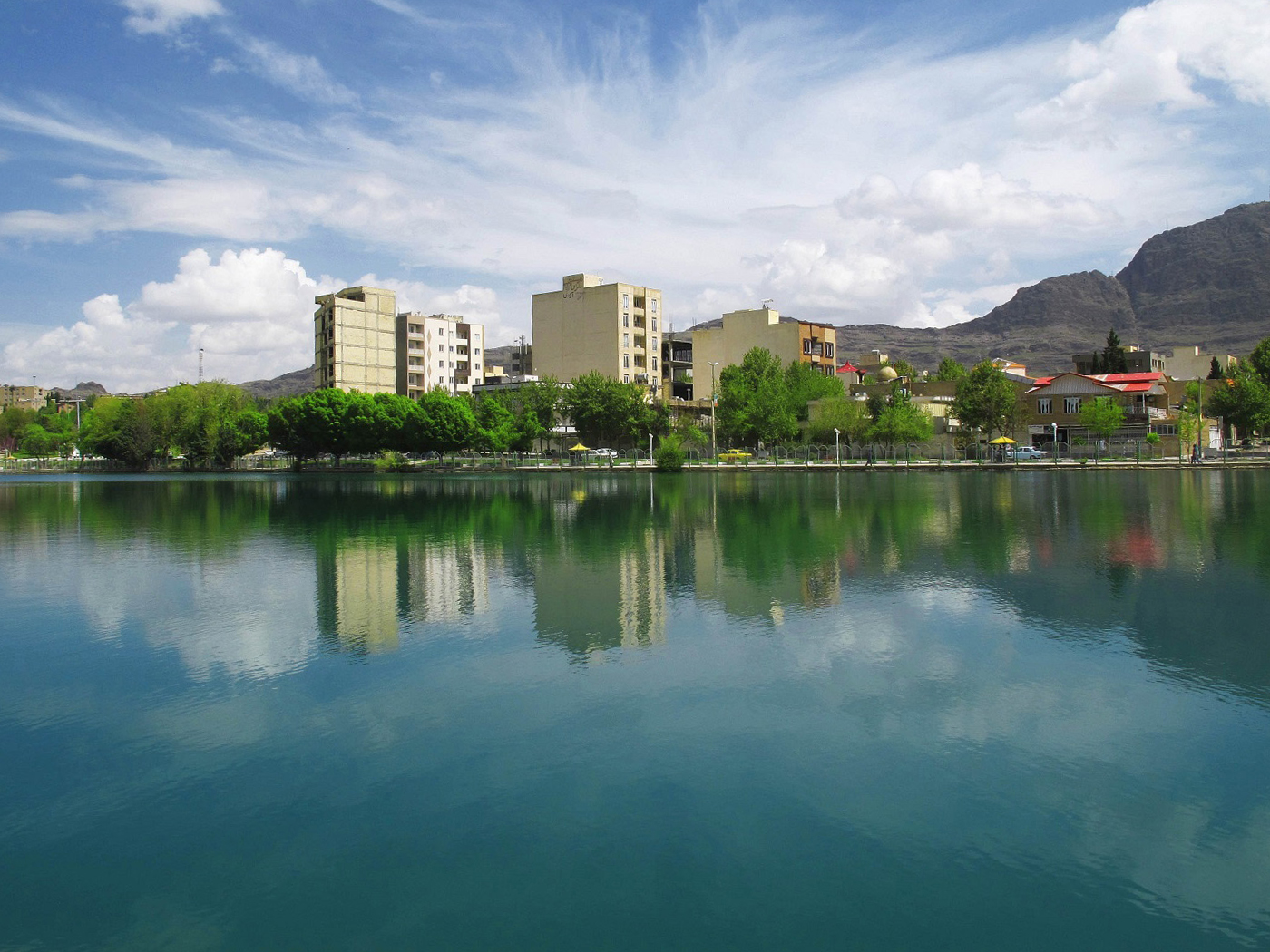
Keeyow Lake, Khorramabad

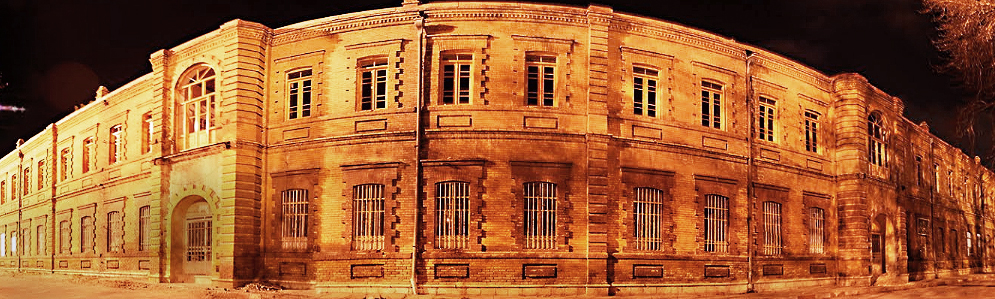
Sarbaz khaneh building

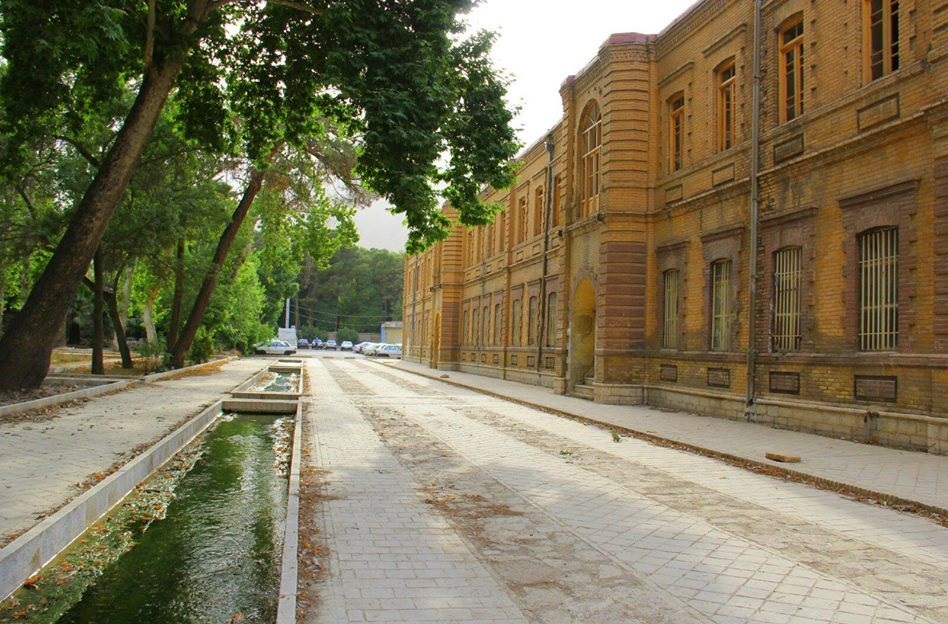
Building in Khorramabad

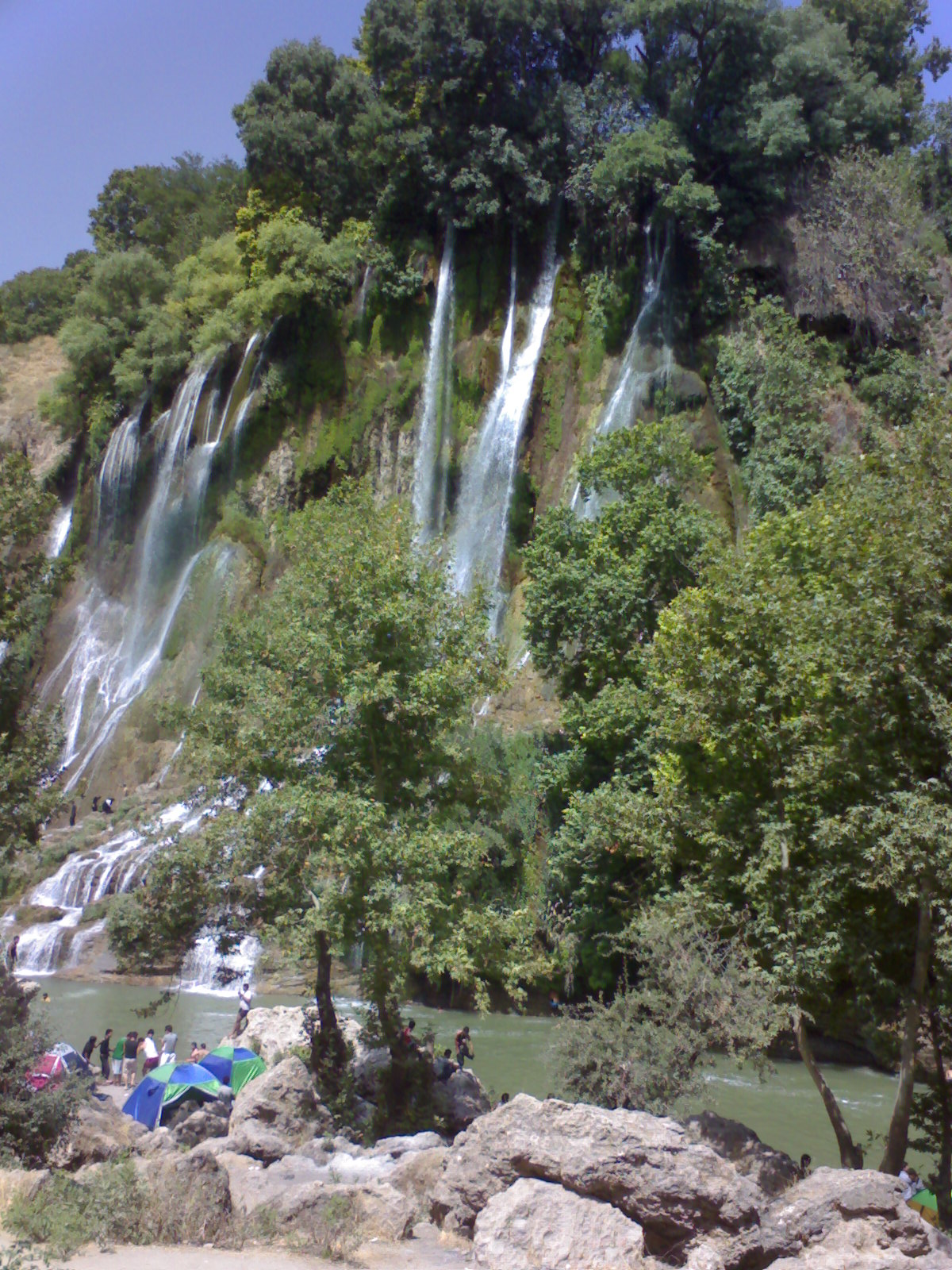
Bisheh waterfall, Khorramabad County

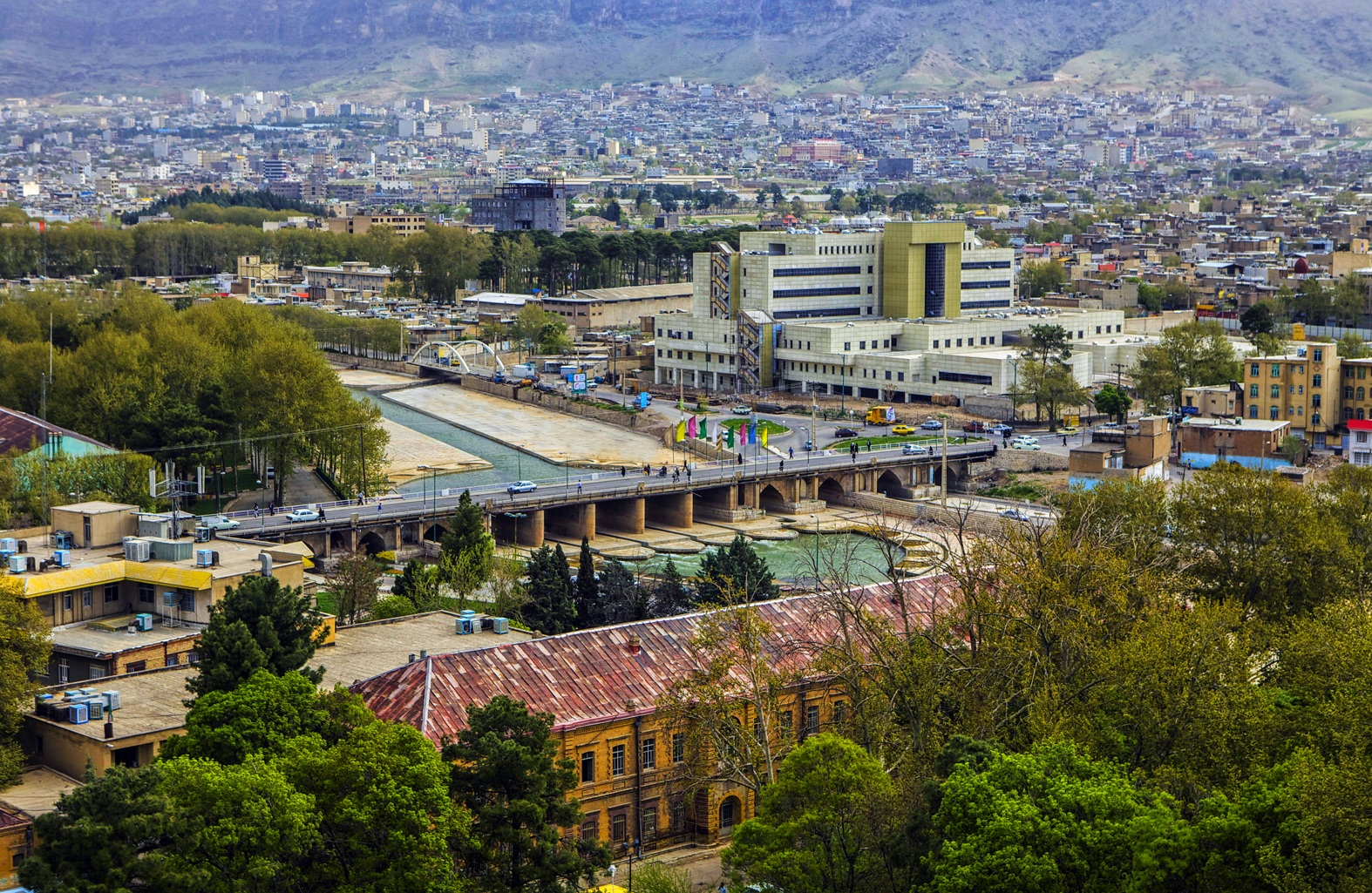
Khorramabad

== See also ==
- List of World Heritage Sites in Iran
- Khaydalu

Media related to Khorramabad at Wikimedia Commons
