= Religion in Kurdistan =

The dominant religion in Kurdistan is Sunni Islam. Other prominent religious traditions in the region include Shia Islam, Yazidism, Yarsanism, Zoroastrianism, Shabakism and Christianity, while Judaism was also a significant minority religion in Kurdistan until the Jewish exodus from the Muslim world in the 20th century.

According to a 2016 estimate by the Kurdish Institute of Paris, Kurdistan's total population is approximately 34.5 million people, including Kurds, Turks, Arabs, Assyrians, Armenians, and Yazidis, among other ethnic groups, contributing to the region's religious diversity.

== Islam ==
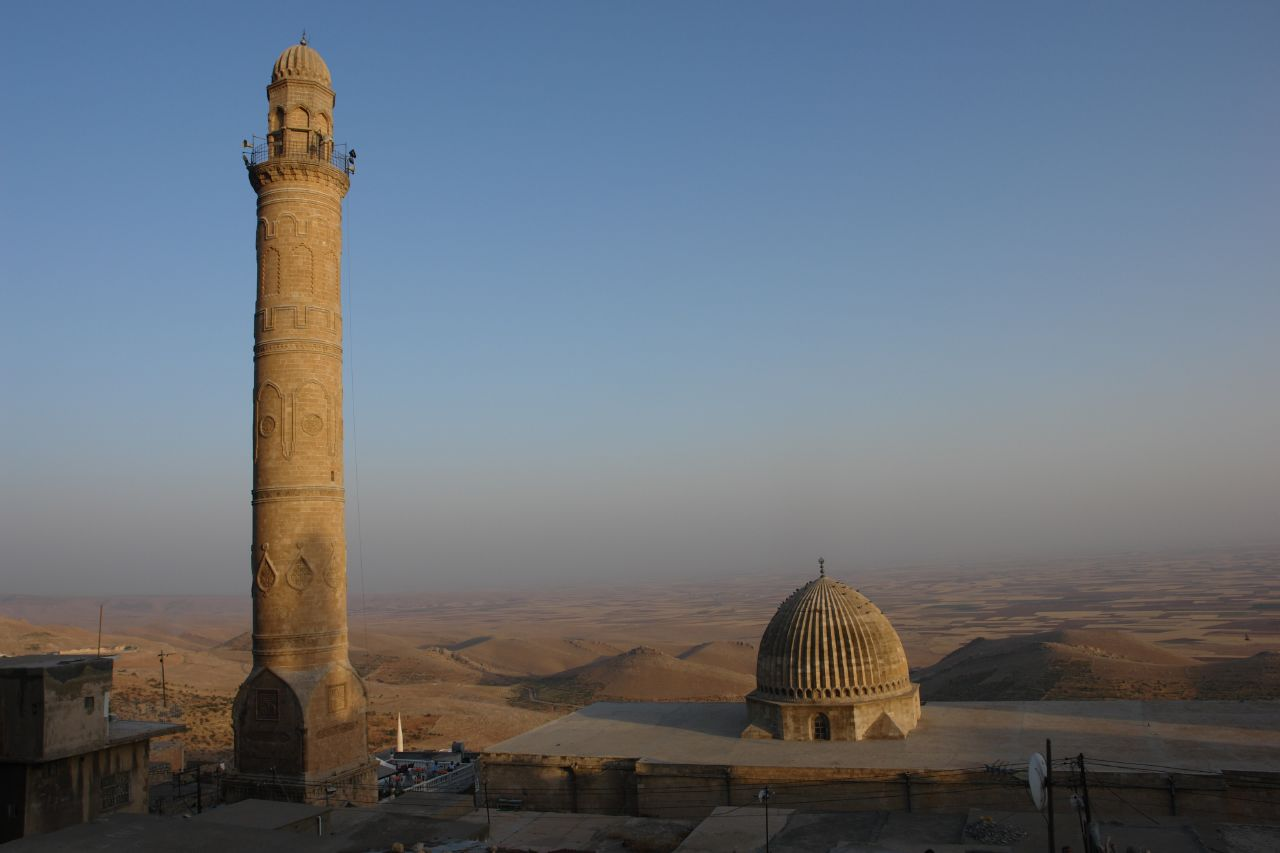
The great mosque in Mardin

The majority of Kurdish people are Muslims. While the relationship between religion and nationalism has usually been strained and ambivalent with the strong hold of the Islamic leaders in Kurdish society, it has generally been the conservative Muslim Kurds who formed the backbone of Kurdish nationalist movements. According to van Bruinessen, Kurdish identity was largely tribal and defined by Sunni Islam until the rise of nationalism in the later Ottoman Empire, although historic leaders such as Idris Bitlisi or Sharafkhan Bitlisi may have exaggerated the Sunni tendencies among the Kurds as to disspell any doubts about their loyalty to the Ottomans.

As of 2023 in Iraqi Kurdistan, Nabaz Ismail, the spokesperson for the autonomous region's Ministry of Endowments and Religious Affairs, estimates the total number of mosques to stand at 5,820, with 3,380 (58%) of them offering Friday sermons, and 129 mosques opening in one year, including 56 in the regional capital city, Erbil. He further states that the ministry employs 2,700 Islamic teachers and operates 100 Quran memorization centers as well 21 Islamic schools. Nabaz Ismail also says that 99% of the mosques have been built through philanthropy, relying on private donors and their charity in the form of zakat or sadaqah.

=== Self-identification as Muslim first ===
Based on cross-national comparative surveys conducted in 2011 and 2013, it has been found out that when asked about what constitute their most important identity ("above all"), among the Kurds of Turkey 66% chose Muslim, 20% chose the Kurdish identity and 11% the Turkish nation, while among the Kurds of Iraq, 59% chose Muslim, 27% went for their Kurdish identity and 13% chose the Iraqi nation.

=== Sunni Islam ===
The majority of Kurds are Sunni Muslims. The exact proportion is uncertain but McDowall gives the percentage as "approximately 75%", while Martin van Bruinessen estimates around two-thirds or three-quarters at least. Most Sunni Kurds follow the Shafi‘i school, which distinguishes them from Arab and Turkish neighbors who in general are Hanafi. This difference is identified by some Kurds as being essential to their ethnic identity and deliberately emphasized.

During the last six centuries, the Kurdish ulama had an influential role in the Ottoman court and taught at important universities like Al-Azhar University and in the Holy Cities of Arabia, Medina and Mecca. Moreover, due to the location of Kurdistan between the three major cultural Islamic regions, many Kurdish ulama not only knew Kurdish, but also Arabic, Persian, and Turkish, giving them an important role in mediating between Indian Muslims who communicated in Persian, Arabic, and Turkish. Kurdish ulama teachings also had a lasting impact in Indonesia.

Sunni Islam among Kurds is characterized by a strong overtone of mysticism and its scholars’ affiliation with Sufi orders. In Kurdish society these constitute a hierarchical system, in which the leaders (sheikh) deploy their influence onto the localities through their deputies (khalifa), who mediate between sheikhs and common people. Today, Naqshbandiya and Qadiriyya are the most active tariqas. These tariqas had produced numbers of significant figures in the early history of Kurdish nationalist movements, including Mahmud Barzanji of Qadiriyyah, and Sheikh Said and Sheikh Ubeydullah of Naqshbandiya. Strong influences of sheikhs in the late 19th and the early 20th centuries were attributed to the Ottoman administrative reforms and the defense against the intrusion of Christian missionaries.

Modern political development among Sunni Muslim Kurds varies throughout the state to which they belong. In Turkey, Said Nursi exerted major influence. Nursi devoted himself to intellectual development. This became the basis of the Nur Movement which espoused Islamic Modernism, mysticism, compatibility with modern science, and tolerance. The Nur movement garnered several million followings in the mid 20th century. The group fragmented substantially in the 1970s and 1980s, resulting in offshoots such as the Gülen movement.

=== Shia Islam ===
There is a minority of Twelver Shi'i Muslims in southern parts of Kurdistan in Kermanshah province, Khanaqin, Mandali, and Ilam province. The proportion of Kurds who ascribe to Twelverism is potentially up to 15%. Historically, there was also a small community of Zaydi Kurds in Iraq. In Iraqi Kurdistan, there were several Shia influenced groups, including the Feyli Kurds, Kaka'is, and Shabaks.

An Alevi community mostly live in north western parts of Kurdistan. They are mostly concentrated in Tunceli Province.

=== Influence on Kurdish identity ===
While studying youth religiosity in Iraqi Kurdistan, Kurdish sociologist Ibrahim Sadiq Malazada through his 2021 empirical research estimates the religious youth to stand at around 50%, or roughly half, noting that the rise of the Islamic State has had no real impact (with 8-9% decreasing their religiosity but 7% increasing due to ISIS), while COVID-19 instead strengthened religiosity (as 29% consider it "a divine test for society"), Malazada concluding that the "religious identity among youth in Kurdistan tended to be stable and that there has been no significant change in the religious tendencies of young people." As per the same research, 30% of the young Kurds consider their religious identity as being as important as their national identity, 29% consider their religious identity to be more important while 7% consider religion as "the only remaining source of pride."

There are also concerns about youth radicalization because of the worsening socio-economic conditions in Iraqi Kurdistan, even though they go for a quietist form of Salafism, often favored by the local parties in order to reduce the influence of Muslim Brotherhood–affiliated groups, instead of the more violent and revolutionary Salafi jihadism. Salafism among Kurds is a phenomenon going beyond the youth in Iraqi Kurdistan.

== Yazidism ==
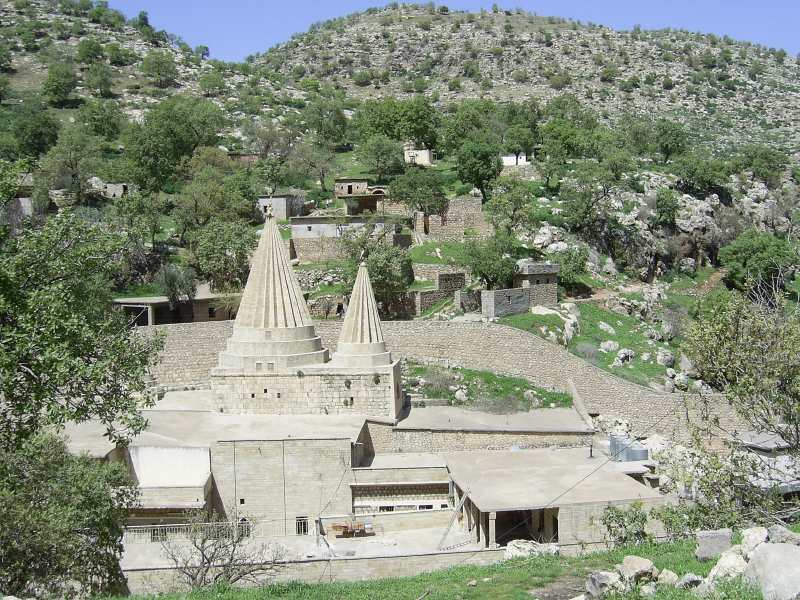
Lalish is the holy place of Yazidis.

Yazidism is a monotheistic ethnic religion with roots in a western branch of an Iranic pre-Zoroastrian religion. It is based on the belief of one God who created the world and entrusted it into the care of seven Holy Beings. The leader of this heptad is Tawûsê Melek, who is symbolized with a peacock. Its adherents number from 700,000 to 1 million worldwide and are indigenous to the Kurdish regions of Iraq, Syria and Turkey, with some significant, more recent communities in Russia, Georgia and Armenia established by refugees fleeing Muslim persecution in Ottoman Empire. Yazidism shares with Kurdish Alevism and Yarsanism a lot of similarities that date back to pre-Islam.

== Yarsanism ==
Yarsanism (also known as Ahl-I-Haqq, Ahl-e-Hagh or Kakai) is also one of the religions that are associated with Kurdistan.

Although most of the sacred Yarsan texts are in the Gorani and all of the Yarsan holy places are located in Kurdistan, followers of this religion are also found in other regions. For example, while there are more than 300,000 Yarsani in Iraqi Kurdistan, there are more than 2 million Yarsani in Iran. However, the Yarsani lack political rights in both countries.

During the war with ISIL, many Yarsani followers were persecuted by the Islamic State, being considered as “heretics” and being driven away from their villages. However, Peshmerga offensives have drove out the Islamic State, and the Yarsani people now enjoy relative safety.

== Zoroastrianism ==
Zoroastrianism was one of the dominant religions in Kurdistan before the Islamic era. Currently, Zoroastrianism is an officially recognized religion in Iraqi Kurdistan and Iran and two Zoroastrian temples have opened in Iraqi Kurdistan after the official recognition of Zoroastrianism in the region in 2015. There was a trend of Zoroastrianism in 2015 as well, where many accepted Zoroastrianism after being disillusioned with Islam because of the Islamic State. Most Kurds who converted to Zoroastrianism did so because they considered it a native religion and more welcoming than Islam, but many Kurds also did convert to Zoroastrianism out of genuine conviction. Some non-Kurds also converted to Zoroastrianism. A Kurdish Islamic cleric from Sulaymaniyah, on the other hand, claimed that Zoroastrianism was not the ancestral religion of Kurds and that it was forced on them by "fire-worshipping Persians", whereas Islam freed them. He then called on Kurds to kill Zoroastrian converts if they do not convert back to Islam within three days of their conversion. On 21 September 2016, the first official Zoroastrian fire temple of Iraqi Kurdistan opened in Sulaymaniyah.

The Zoroastrian community in Iraqi Kurdistan has claimed that thousands of people have recently converted to Zoroastrianism in the region; however, this has not been confirmed by independent sources. In 2020, it was reported that there are 120 Zoroastrians in Iraqi Kurdistan.

== Christianity ==
2014 VOA report about Iraqi religious minorities finding refuge in Kurdistan

Christianity is present in the Kurdistan Region of Iraq through the presence of several distinct communities. Most are Assyrians, who practice under a multitude of denominations such as the Assyrian Church of the East, the Chaldean Catholic Church, and the Syriac Orthodox Church. Other Christian communities include Armenians, and the Kurdish Christian minority. The Assyrian and Armenian communities in the Kurdistan Region of Iraq live primarily in the Erbil and Dohuk Governorates.

== Judaism ==
There used to be a Jewish minority in most parts of Kurdistan, but most of them were forced to flee to Israel in the mid-20th century. At the beginning of the 20th century, the cities of Kermanshah, Orumieh, Piranshahr and Mahabad had the largest Jewish populations in Iranian Kurdistan.

According to recent reports, there were between 400 and 730 Jewish families living in the Kurdish region. However, Dr. Mordechai Zaken, an Israeli expert on Kurdish affairs, told the Jerusalem Post in November 2015 interview that the media reports on 430 Jewish families in Iraqi Kurdistan were false: "There were several dozen families that had some distant family connection to Judaism and most of them immigrated to Israel in the aftermath of the Gulf War...".

On October 18, 2015, the Kurdistan Regional Government named Sherzad Omar Mamsani, a Kurdish Jew, as the Jewish representative of the Ministry of Endowment and Religious Affairs. In 2017, Rabbi Daniel Edri, a Chief rabbi of rabbinical coury of Haifa in Israel, claimed he was appointed the chief Rabbi of Kurdistan by the Kurdish Region's Minister of Endowment and Religious Affairs. In 2018, Sherzad Memsani was removed from his position.

== Religiosity and Kurdish politics ==
Kurdistan was referred to as "the last safe haven for secularism" in a region rife with religious extremism. In 2012, the semi-autonomous Kurdistan Region declared that public schools were to be religiously neutral and that all major religions of the world are taught on an equal basis. By 2012, the KRG and AANES were the only administrations in the entire region in which public schools did not endorse any specific religion.

=== In Turkey ===
Much of the secularism in Kurdistan was fueled by disenchantment with religion due to oppression in the name of Islam by various state governments. In Turkey, during World War I, Turkish nationalists used Islam to incite Kurds against Armenians, and to recruit Kurds who believed that they were fighting to save the caliphate during the Turkish War of Independence. After Turkish independence, Islam was quickly discarded, leading some Kurds to the view that religion was used and discarded cynically. The Presidency of Religious Affairs (Diyanet) was founded in 1924 to institutionalize Islam. While Turkey was officially secular, it promoted a heavily Turkish-centric form of Sunni Islam which aggressively promoted Turkish nationalism and loyalty to the state. Kurdish language and culture were excluded from mosque sermons, religious schools, and state-sanctioned theology. Following the 1980 military coup, the regime adopted the Turkish-Islamic synthesis. Sunni Islam was framed as part of Turkish identity, not as a shared faith inclusive of Kurds. Kurdish Islamic figures who spoke against the weaponization of Islam against Kurdish identity were accused of apostasy. Under the Justice and Development Party (AKP), particularly during the 2010s, the state returned to open religiosity. The state intensified Diyanet activities in Kurdish cities, constructing thousands of mosques and promoting a vision of Islam tied to Turkish identity. Kurdish imams were required to deliver pre-written sermons that promoted Turkish nationalism. Kurdish political movements adopted an explicitly secular platform in response. Many Kurds refused to attend mosques and began viewing them as Turkish nationalist indoctrination institutions. The PKK took up arms in the 1980s, with a secular Marxist ideology adopted as in direct defiance to the 1980 Turkish coup, which made the Turkish-Islamic synthesis the state ideology and banned the Kurdish language, and was seen by Kurds as one of the most oppressive Turkish governments. During the 1990s and 2000s, many Turkish-Islamic nationalists made extensive efforts to pressure Kurds into leaving Islam. The main motives were to increase the association of Islam with Turkish identity, and to increase anti-Kurdish sentiment in the wider Islamic world. The Turkish government cited the fact that Kurds were mostly Muslim to deny Kurdish identity, claiming that all Muslims in Turkey were Turks and that a Muslim who identified as a Kurd could not be Muslim. During that time, Kurdish secular politics rapidly increased. Although many secularists remained Muslims in their personal life, others completely rejected Islam, viewing it as Turkish spiritual colonialism.

=== In Iraq ===
In Ba'athist Iraq, the regime of Saddam Hussein fused Arab nationalism and Islam during the Iran–Iraq War, and especially after the Gulf War. Mosques were built under state slogans, the Quran was published with Saddam’s own blood, and Islamic verses were painted on tanks and warplanes, many of which were used to destroy Kurdish villages. Sunni Arab religious leaders gave fatwas justifying the Anfal campaign on the grounds that Kurds were separatists and apostates. The fact that the Anfal campaign was named after Surah Anfal had reinforced the controversy. Many Kurds who left Islam, including some Anfal survivors, claimed that Islamic institutions in Iraq and the broader Islamic world were deliberately silent during the Anfal campaign. From the 1980s until the 2003, Kurdish Islamists attempted to counter the rise of secularism. Saddam Hussein viewed them as the biggest challenge to the Iraqi government claim of representing true Islam. Nevertheless, the Kurdish Islamists were defeated by secular Kurdish forces in 2003 and politically marginalized afterwards. Secularism became a hallmark of Kurdish political parties in Iraq, largely in response to the Iraqi government exploitation of Islam, both the Sunni and Shia sects. Both the Patriotic Union of Kurdistan (PUK) and the Kurdistan Democratic Party (KDP) emerged as secular nationalist organizations. Several decades after the Anfal campaign, PUK media continued recalling the complicity of Arab Islamic clerics.

=== In Syria ===
In Ba’athist Syria, the state imposed an Arab nationalist ideology that often exploited Sunni Islamic conservatism to delegitimize Kurdish cultural rights. Kurds were often denied citizenship and were banned from using the Kurdish language in schools or public settings. Mosques, under state control, propagated Arab nationalism, and religious institutions excluded Kurds. Many Kurdish Islamic figures who resisted this were imprisoned or killed. As a result, many Syrian Kurds turned to leftist and secular organizations, some of which framed Islam as an obstacle to Kurdish self-determination. The Syrian Muslim Brotherhood refused to speak up against atrocities committed by the Assad regime on Kurds, claiming it was divisive to the Muslim world. During the Syrian civil war, the Turkey-backed Islamist groups regularly committed atrocities on Kurds, including the killings and expulsions of civilians. The factions frequently used Islamic slogans and invoked religious justifications. While mosques under the Assad government already marginalized Kurds, the mosques that were taken over by Turkey-backed Islamist groups blatantly propagated anti-Kurdish rhetoric that was often worse than that of the Assad government. Many Kurds in Syria felt completely alienated with Islam, as the Assad government, Turkey-backed Islamist groups, and the Islamic State had all used Islam to antagonize Kurds. Some who survived the atrocities committed by the Islamic State and Turkey-backed Islamic groups later openly declared their apostasy from Islam.

=== In Iran ===
The government of Pahlavi Iran was largely indifferent to Islam, but often hostile towards it. The Pahlavi government explicitly stated that Iranian identity was superior to Islam. However, most Kurds in Iran were Sunni Muslims, which was seen as much more foreign than Shia Islam. Kurds were ethnically and religiously marginalized. After the 1979 revolution, Kurds were subjected to systemic discrimination by the state for being mostly Sunni Muslims. Furthermore, Iran attempted to distance Shia Kurds from Sunni Kurds, claiming that Shia Kurds were part of the religious majority of Iran and thus did not need special rights. During the 1980s and 1990s, more Iranian Kurds shifted to secularism. Many Iranian Kurdish opposition groups in exile criticized clericalism, Islamism, and what they called “Shia colonialism” in Kurdistan. Most Kurdish separatist groups in Iran defined martyrdom in nationalistic terms rather than religious. The secular political groups gained support from Iranian Kurds who rejected both the Shia Islam promoted by the Iranian government and the traditional Sunni Islam in Kurdish society.

=== Secularization of Kurdish independence movements ===
Many Kurds who left Islam often expressed deep disillusionment with the broader Muslim world, claiming that the Muslim world was hypocritical and held double standards for condemning the Kurdish independence movement yet staying silent during periods of mass violence against Kurds, and ignoring the reason Kurds launched separatist revolts in the first place. The secularism of Kurdish nationalism was largely a reaction to the usage of Islam by several Arab, Iranian, and Turkish governments to suppress Kurdish identity.

The PKK stated that the Turkish government weaponizing Islam against Kurdish identity had secularized Kurdistan much more effectively and quickly than decades of socialist propaganda. During the 21st century, Kurds who left Islam because of the actions of Muslims had significantly outnumbered the Kurds who left Islam due to theological disagreements. In the 20th and 21st centuries, several Kurdish secular intellectuals, while explicitly stating their opposition to the suffering of their people, had acknowledged that various state governments weaponizing Islam against Kurds had secularized Kurdistan far beyond the dreams of secular Kurds.

== See also ==
- Spread of Islam among Kurds
- Religion in the Middle East
