= Sarliyya =

Kurdish heterodox religious community in Iraq

Sarliyya (Arabic: صارلي; Kurdish: سارڵی) refers to a Kurdish heterodox religious community which followed Yarsanism. They spoke several languages and were similar to other heterodox Shia communities in northern Iraq.

== Etymology ==
There were different theories about the origin of their name. One tradition claimed that since the Sarliyya were able to purchase land in paradise and then claim "The Garden of Paradise has become [sarat] mine by purchase." With "sarat" meaning "became" in Arabic, they were called Sarliyya. Al-Karmali believed it was wrong as it assumed that the name was Arabic when the Sarliyya were not Arabs. Another theory referred to the same tradition but stated that when Abd al-Rahman Ibn Muljam assassinated the Imam Ali, he asked Imam Ali how he thought Ibn Muljam should escape, and Ali answered, "iltaff", meaning "to wrap" in Arabic, which translates as "sar" in Turkish. The theory claimed that Sarliyya originated from that phrase. Khattab Agha, a former leader of the Sarliyya in Mosul, claimed that when the Prophet of Islam invited people, especially the Arabian tribes, to accept his message, many of them responded and embraced Islam. They began to attach themselves to the companions of the Prophet, although some of them were unable to do it, as there was no companion left who had not already accepted Arabians as students. Ali called these people to come to him said "they have become mine", first in Kurdish "Banim Baymiz", and then in Arabic "Saru li". Since then, the Sarliyya had been called by this name. Matti Moosa linked the Sarliyya to the Sarlu Turkmens mentioned in Tarikh al-Ghiyathi which were attacked by Timur Lang after 1392. Either way, the term Sarli was used by outsiders, and the community itself identified as "Ibrahimi Kaka'i", and the Shabaks also called them "Kaka'i".

== History ==
The Encyclopedia of Islam mentioned the Sarliyya as a community of Yarsani adherents, known in Iraq as Kaka'i, and lived in six villages in northern Iraq along the banks of the Great Zab and around Mosul. The historical principal settlements of the Sarliyya was the village of Wardak on the right bank of the Great Zab, and Sufayya on the left bank. The Sarliyya were historically very secretive about their religious beliefs like the neighboring Yazidis, Shabaks, and Bajalan. The Sarlis ethnically identified as Kurds, specifically from the Kaka'i tribe. The Sarliyya were commonly mentioned alongside the Kaka'iyya, Shabaks, and Bajalan. The Sarliyya and Kaka'iyya were also described as two subgroups of a single sect, consisting of mostly Kurds, with those around Kirkuk known as Kaka'iyya and those around Mosul known as Sarliyya. The Sarliyya and Kaka'iyya acknowledged the beliefs of each other but not the beliefs of the Shabak. The Sarliyya were also described as intermediary between the Kaka'i and Shabak. In addition to their variant of Gorani, the Sarliyya also spoke Shabaki, Sorani Kurdish, and some Arabic, although none of them spoke Turkmen.

In 1902, Anastase-Marie al-Karmali gave some notes on the Sarlis, Shabaks, and Bajalan, which he received from an individual in Mosul, who claimed that their language was a mixture of Kurdish, Persian and Turkish, and that they were religiously monotheists, believing in certain prophets and in paradise and hell, but they neither fasted nor prayed. They also believed that their leader had the power to sell territory in paradise, and the leader visited all Sarliyya villages during harvest season, and all Sarlis were allowed to purchase as many dhiras as they could buy, with the price of a dhira never being less than a quarter of a mejidiyye. Credit was not granted. The purchases were recorded in a receipt kept by the leader and placed in the pocket of the deceased man so that he could present it to Riḍwan, the guardian of Paradise. Once every lunar year, the Sarlis held a feast-day which included the consumption of a repast at which their leader presided, and each attendee contributed a meal consisting of boiled rooster with rice or wheat, known as Aklat al-Mahabba. After the meal, they were reported to extinguish the lights and host orgies of promiscuity. The leader of the Sarliyya was succeeded at his death by his unmarried son, and he was forbidden to shave his beard or his moustache. The Sarlis practiced polygamy. The Sarlis were also said to have a sacred book written in Persian.

The Sarliyya were targeted by the Ba'athist government in the 1980s. In the 1990s, Turkish nationalist groups attempted to claim the heterodox Shia groups of northern Iraq, such as the Sarliyya, Bajwan, Kaka'is, and Shabaks, as Turkmens, although the attempts were unsuccessful and stopped after.

== See also ==
- Ibrahimiyya
- Shabakism
