= Shabak =

Shabak may refer to:

- Shabak people, an ethnic group in northern Iraq
- Shabaki language, a language of the subgroup Zaza-Gorani of the Northwestern Iranian languages, spoken by the Shabak people
- Shabakism, the syncretic faith practiced by the Shabak people
- Hebrew acronym for the Shin Bet, Israel's internal security service
- Schabak Modell, a die-cast toy producer
- Shabak Samech, an Israeli hip-hop group
