= Salas (tribe) =

Kurdish tribe living mainly in Iran

The Salas (Kurdish: سەڵاس, Selas; Persian: ثلاث, Solas) are a Kurdish tribe living mainly in western Iran. The Salas comprised the Weledbegi, Babajani, and Qobadi tribes, and were originally a part of the Jaf tribe.

== History ==
The Salas tribe emerged after the Jaf tribe began to breakup after World War I. The Salas comprised the Weledbegi, Babajani, and Qobadi tribes. The Salas tribe mainly lived in Kermanshah province. The Qobadi tribe was traditionally settled around Ezgeleh, while the Weledbegi tribe was scattered around Ravansar, Javanrud, Bayangan, and Sar-e Qala, and the Babajani tribe were mostly settled around Salas-e Babajani. According to oral tradition and many other accounts, each of the Salas tribes descended from one of three brothers, Babajan, Qobad, and Weledbeg, who were from the Jaf tribe, and were forced to migrate from Chamchamal in Iraqi Kurdistan to the area around Darneh in Salas-e Babajani in Kermanshah at the time of Timur Lang. Others disputed it and claimed that they either migrated earlier or were native. Some suggested that the name Bavjan, a variant of Babajani, was connected to Bajwan, another name of the Bajalan tribe in Mosul, and that the tribes may have been linked before the migration to the Salas region.

Muhammad Amin Zaki Beg included the Salas tribes (Qobadi, Weledbegi, and Babajani), along with the Anakhi, Imami, Darwash, Diletaza, Mirabegi, Dehtiri, Namdarbegi, and Tayshe, as tribes of Jaf origin which had become independent. In Tarikh-e Mardukh, the Salas tribes (Qobadi, Weledbegi, and Babajani) were included among many other Kurdish tribes in a list of the tribes of Sanandaj. It also mentioned some Babajani living around Kerend which were considered part of the Kerendi tribes.

The Kurdish tribal dynamics shifted significantly by 1920, with the Guran tribe disintegrating, the Kalhor tribe undergoing a leadership crisis, and the Sanjabi enjoying a resurgence. Qasim Khan Sanjabi maintained good relations with the British, and allied with Rashid al-Saltana Qalkhani and Sardar Rashid Ardalani in 1921, seeking to end the raids on livestock by the Weledbegi tribe. The Weledbegi tribe then called for help from the Kalhor tribe. The Iranian central government ordered the Kalhor to attack the Sanjabi, but the conflict was prevented when the new governor of Kermanshah intervened, and pressure from the British further succeeded in neutralizing another potential clash between the Kalhor and the Sanjabi.
