= Kaka'i (tribe) =

Kurdish tribal and religious group

The Kaka'i (Kurdish: کاکەیی, Kakeyî; Arabic: كاكائي; Persian: کاکه‌ای) are a Kurdish tribal federation living mainly in Iraq. The Kaka'i follow Yarsanism and mostly speak Gorani among other languages.

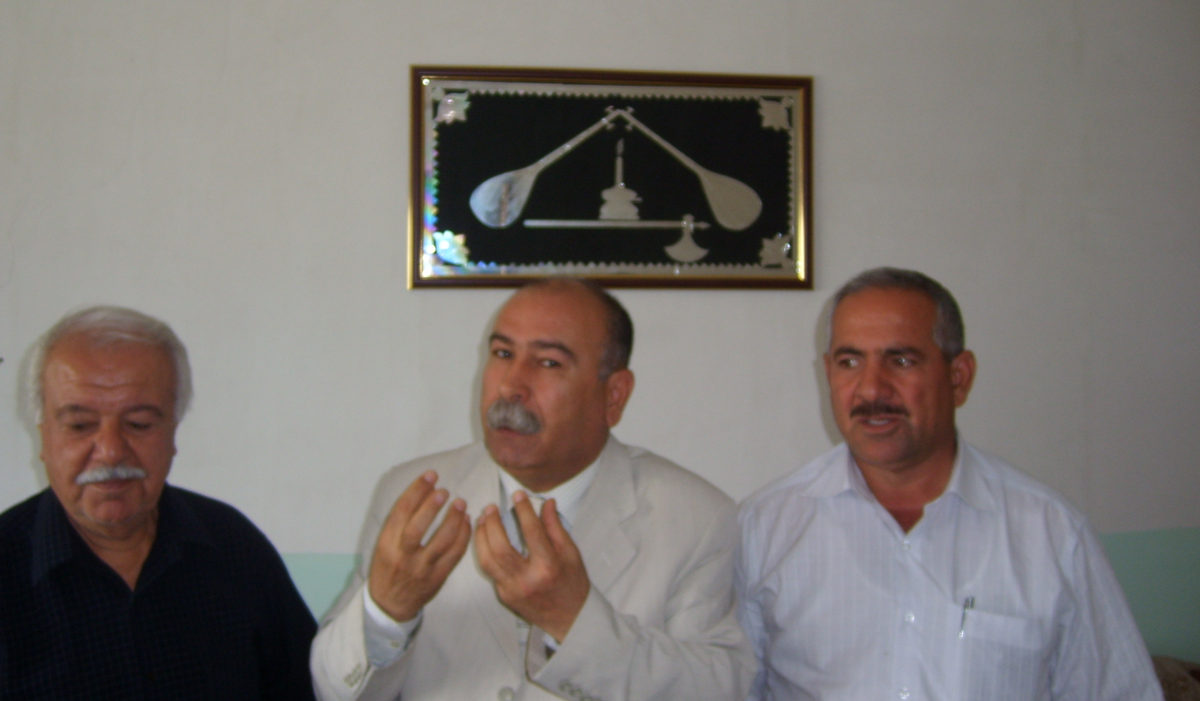
Kaka'i men from Sulaymaniyah in 2007

== Etymology ==
The term Kaka'i derived "kak", meaning "brother" in Kurdish. Kaka'i meant "belonging to the brotherhood." It was similar to the term "Yares(t)an" which meant "circle of friends" and was also used by Yarsanis. In Iraq, the term Kaka'i was very often used to refer to all groups which followed Yarsanism and related sects. In Iraq, other than those who were called Kaka'i in the narrow sense, the Kaka'i label sometimes additionally included the Shabaks, Bajalan, and Sarlis. They were also known in Arabic as "Akhiyya", also meaning "brotherhood".

== History ==
The Kaka'i are a tribal community in northern Iraq which follow Yarsanism. They were historically noted for similarities with other heterodox Shia communities in northern Iraq such as the Shabak, Bajalan, and Sarli, and were often conflated. According to the Encyclopedia of Islam, the Kaka'i were a Kurdish tribe, and the adherents of the Sarliyya sect came from the tribe as well.

According to Leezenberg, out of the Yarsani sects, such as Ibrahimi, Baba Yadgari, Ateshbegi, among others, the Ibrahimi were the most widespread among the Kaka'i of Iraqi Kurdistan. He recorded the most important Kaka'i area in Iraq as a group of villages around Daquq in Kirkuk, with others around Khanaqin and Qasr-e Shirin, while most of the original Kaka'i community in Hawraman had declined. He also claimed that there was a Kaka'i community in the Eski Kalak region on the Greater Zab near Mosul which was called Sarliyya by outsiders. The Sarliyya were a Kaka'i community which followed the Ibrahimi family and they did not accept the name Sarli. They were seen as intermediary between the Kaka'i and the Shabaks.

The Kaka'i identified as Kurds and claimed to originate from the mountains around Kermanshah. The only existing volume of their holy book, the Zanur, remained in that region. The Kaka'i were historically multilingual. The native language of most Kaka'i was a variant of Gorani, which they called Macho. Some spoke it as a second language, while others did not at all. Many Kaka'i spoke Sorani Kurdish. Some also spoke Turkmen or Arabic. Many Kaka'i around Kirkuk spoke Turkmen but considered themselves Kurds. Gorani was spoken by most Kaka'i in Kirkuk, while other speakers of Gorani around Iraq included the Bajalan tribe east of Mosul and in Khanaqin, the Goran tribe, Shabaks, and Sarlis in the north and northeast of Mosul, and the Zangana tribe in Kirkuk. The Kaka'i leaders in Iraq, described as "the Ahl-i Haqq par excellence", had gained proficiency in Turkish from living close to Ottoman authorities in Kirkuk, but disassociated themselves with heterodox groups that were ethnically Turkmen in Tauq, Lailan, Tuz Khurmatu, Taza, and others. On the other hand, the Kaka'i commoners spoke Gorani.

Fattah Agha, historically one of the most powerful Kaka'i leaders, who died in the 1950s, showed Kurdish nationalist tendencies, refusing to join the Talabani and Dawudi tribes which sided with the Iraqi government against Mahmud Barzinji. One of his sons, Adnan Agha, later became the most active Kaka'i leader. Fattah Agha was an Ibrahimi leader based in Erbil. The Sarliyya, who identified as Kaka'i which followed the Ibrahimi sect, lived with the Shabaks. Many of the Shabaks converted to their religion and accepted the patronage of Fattah Agha, while Fattah Agha accepted them as full members.

After the establishment of the Iraqi government in 1921, the Kaka'i faced discrimination for their religion, and they were also registered by law as Muslims. They were further exposed to discrimination for being Kurds. Before World War II, the Kaka'i were forced to register as Arabs and after 1933 they were increasingly displaced from their homes which lied between the Arab and Kurdish regions. After 1963, under the Ba'athist regime, persecution of the Kaka'i had intensified, and they were constantly displaced from 1970 to 1971 and from 1975 to 1987. Their villages were destroyed, and they were deported from Baghdad and their lands near the border with Iran. In the 1970s, Iraqi Turkmen nationalists began claiming the Kaka'i as Turkmen. Kaka'i poet Hijri Dede, who wrote in Persian, Kurdish, and Gorani, but nothing in Turkish, was made a member of the Turkmen Writers Union in Baghdad and his children were said to have become. The Kaka'i, as well as other heterodox Shia communities in northern Iraq, were targeted by a Turkification campaign which was unsuccessful and abandoned. After the Iran-Iraq war, the Kaka'i were persecuted in the same way as the Feyli Kurds. In 1991, after the Gulf War, the Kaka'i were further displaced. In 1991, the Kaka'i were again forced to register as Arab. There was a branch of the Kaka'i leadership in Kirkuk which traditionally preferred to speak Turkmen, only acquiring fluency in Kurdish during the early 1970s, and later joined the NDB in the 1980s and started to proclaim themselves as Arabs. The Ba'athist government was anxious to portray the Kaka'i as Arabs. It claimed that the Kaka'i leaders, called sayyids, were direct descendants of Muhammad, which Kaka'i religious specialists rejected. Not all Kaka'i supported the Kurdish movement in the 1970s, as some stayed neutral, while others sided with the Ba'athist government. Many of those who sided with the Ba'athist government had been forced.

After 2003, their traditional land fell under the Article 140 disputed territories, and they were targeted throughout the Iraqi civil war. In addition to religious persecution, the Kaka'i were also targeted for being Kurds, and they generally supported incorporation into the Kurdistan Region under which they felt safer. Kaka'i writer Falakuddin Kakayi, who died in 2013, was the KRG minister of culture before taking charge of Erbil-Ankara relations. The Kaka'i population in Iraq was estimated around 200,000 in 2013. In summer 2014, when ISIS invaded the area around Mosul, many Kaka'i were displaced from the region around the Nineveh Plains. The Kaka'i feared the same fate as Yazidis, and did not trust any army to protect them, and requested the KRG to form a special Kaka'i unit to fight alongside the Peshmerga. The Kaka'i religious shrines of Shah Hayas and Tekye Baba Heydari were destroyed by ISIS. Around the same time, the Kaka'i faced increased discrimination in Iraq, causing Kaka'i leaders in Kirkuk to publicly declare themselves Muslim, although extreme Islamist scholars continued to target them, leading to them receiving death threats. The Kaka'i were increasingly targeted after the Peshmerga withdrawal in 2017. There were many bombings and killings targeting their community. The Kaka'i fled the villages of Shishakan, Alwa Pasha, Sid Abbas and Sid Hussein, after the Kaka'i shrine of Seyed Zibar was destroyed. They were targeted by Iraqi authorities as well. In Khanaqin, the shrine of Bawa Mahmoud, a famous Kaka'i symbol, was subjected to a series of explosions. While the Kaka'i ethnically identified as Kurds, some of them sought distinct political representation amid attacks on the community after 2003.

== See also ==
- Ghulat
