= Kerendi (tribe) =

Kurdish tribe living mainly in Iran

The Kerendi (Kurdish: کرنی, Kirinî; Persian: کرندی, Karandī) are a Kurdish tribe living mainly in western Iran, primarily the region around Kerend-e Gharb in Kermanshah province. They originated as a confederation of smaller tribes of different origins and religions.

== History ==
The tribes of Kerend originated as a collection of small tribes which mostly broke away from larger tribes and united. They included the Babajani, Jaf-e Gandomban (an offshoot of the Salas tribe), Simani-ye Gasur, Jowzaga (Yarsani, originally Guran), Kolah-pahn (related to the Kalhor), and Habibvand (immigrants from Posht-e Kuh, which later became Ilam province). In Tarikh-e Mardukh, the Kerendi tribe was said to comprise 6,000 families around Kerend into 14 clans known as Kerendi, Bivanji, Rashid-Ali, Jalalvand, Pataqi, Babajani, Ayina'i, Jowzaga'i, Sarmili, Helte'i, Yeri, Cheshma-Sefidi, Khosrow-Bahmani, and Nasrabadi. He also wrote that the Babajani tribe among them was present in Javanrud and was originally from the Jaf tribe. Although some Kerendi tribes were originated from the Guran confederation, the Kerendi tribes were an independent tribe and listed separately from the Guran and other tribes.

The Kerendi tribes were listed among the Southern Kurdish tribes between Kermanshah and the Iran-Iraq border. The Kerendi tribe was traditionally centered in the city of Kerend-e Gharb and the surrounding region. Before World War I, along with the Mangur, the Kalhur and Guran were the largest Kurdish tribes in Iran. However, the internal divisions of the Guran gave a chance to the smaller tribes such as the Kerendi, Sanjabi, and Zangana, to play a bigger role in the politics of southern Kurdistan. The Kerendi consisted of around 2,000 tents at the time. In May 1912, Dawud Khan Kalhor had badly upset the Kerendi tribe, and more Kurdish tribes were turning against Dawud Khan, who was only saved by the agreement of the tribes to stay their hand until the rebellion of Salar-od-Dowlah was resolved one way or the other. Dawud Khan was later killed while marching to Tehran.
