= Abolfath Mirza Salar od-Dowleh =

Abolfath Mirza
- Salar od-Dowleh
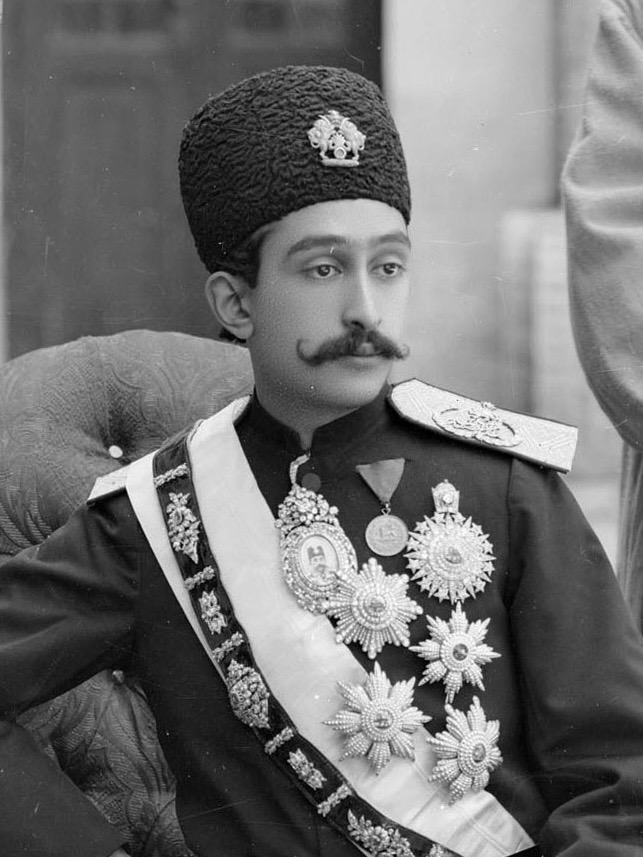
- Salar-al-Daulah by Antoin Sevruguin
- Born: 1881; Tehran, Sublime State of Iran
- Died: 1959 (aged 79); Alexandria, Egypt
- Dynasty: Qajar
- Father: Mozaffar ad-Din Shah Qajar
- Religion: Twelver Shia Islam

Abolfath Mirza (Persian: ابوالفتح میرزا; 1881–1959), also known as Salar od-Dowleh (Persian: سالارالدوله) was an Qajar prince and leader of Anti constitutionalist revolt. He was son of Mozaffar ad-Din Shah Qajar.

== Early life ==
Abu’l-Fath Mirza was born on 1881 in Tabriz. After receiving his elementary and military education in Tabriz, he was appointed governor of several provinces in Iran, but was often dismissed following complaints from the local population about his conduct. Salar od-Dowleh has been described as lacking any moral or personal stability. Most sources do not portray him positively and describe him as a simple-minded person. Ahmad Kasravi referred to him as a “frivolous prince” and “empty-headed,” while Morgan Shuster described him as mad.

== Career ==
During Naser al-Din Shah's third trip to Europe in 1888–1889, while passing through Tabriz, he granted him the title of Salar od-Dowleh. In 1897/98, Salar od-Dowleh was appointed governor of Kermanshah and commander of the frontier of the Iraqi territories, with Zayn al-Abidin Khan Hesam ol-Molk Qaraqozlo serving as his minister and deputy. He governed Kermanshah for six months, during which he committed numerous acts of oppression and abuse against the local population. The people of Kermanshah consequently complained about him to Mozaffar al-Din Shah, who dismissed him from office. In 1898-99, he was appointed governor of the Khamsa region (Zanjan), with Mirza Mahmud Khan Modir od-Dolwh serving as his deputy.

=== Persian Constitutional Revolution ===
After the Persian Constitutional Revolution, he left from Iran and in support of his brother Mohammad Ali Shah Qajar, launched a rebellion in Western Iran. He captured Sanandaj and called upon the National Consultative Assembly to cooperate with the deposed shah. Following Mohammad Ali Shah’s deposition, he met his brother in Vienna and then re-entered Iran via the Ottoman Empire in an effort to restore him to the throne. With a force drawn from the Kalhor, Jaff, Sanjâbi, and Lurs, he succeeded in capturing Kermanshah and Hamadan. In the first engagement against the constitutionalists, commanded by Amir Mofakham Bakhtiari and fought near Malayer, Salar al-Dowleh emerged victorious. He then advanced toward Tehran with a force of approximately 30,000 troops. In the second battle, fought near Saveh between the constitutionalist forces under Amir Mofakham Bakhtiari and Salar od-Dowleh's army, he suffered a decisive defeat. Although he managed to escape the battlefield, the National Consultative Assembly placed a bounty of 25,000 tomans on his capture or execution, prompting him to flee once again to the Ottoman Empire.

== Marriage and Family ==
To advance his political objectives in western Iran, Salar od-Dowleh married the daughters of leaders of the tribes and nomadic groups in the region, with whom he had nine children. One of these wives was Maleka Khanum, the daughter of Gholamreza Khan, governor of Posht-e Kuh, by his wife Agha Soltan, the granddaughter of Lotf-Ali Khan Balavand, the ancestor of the prominent Asfandiyari Balavand family Another of his wives was Agha Ziba, She was the daughter of Nazar-Ali Khan, son of Barkhordar Khan, the governor of Selseleh and Delfan, they had no children together. During his residence in Europe, Salar od-Dowleh married a Swiss woman named Helen, who was given the title Banu-ye Mo'azzam (Most Noble Lady). They had one son and three daughters. According to Willem Floor, Salar od-Dowleh had ten children with his wives, as follows:

No.	Name	Mother	Notes
1	Nur od-Dowleh	Fatemeh Khanum Forugh al-Saltaneh	
2	Soltan Majid Mirza	Monir od-Dowleh	Married Asieh, daughter of Mohammad Ali Shah Qajar
3	Qamar od-Dowleh	Monir od-Dowleh	Married Hossein Ali Mirza E'tezad os-Saltaneh, son of Mohammad Ali Shah
4	Mo'azzaz od-Dowleh	?	
5	Mohammad Reza Mirza	Maleka Khanum Qods al-Dawla	
6	Naser al-Din Mirza	Helen Khanum, Banu-ye Mo'azzam	
7	Farah	Helen Khanum, Banu-ye Mo'azzam	
8	Manijeh	Helen Khanum, Banu-ye Mo'azzam	
9	Nahid	Helen Khanum, Banu-ye Mo'azzam	
10	Maryam Shokuh-e A'zam	Farah os-Saltaneh	

== Sources ==
- Ahanjeideh, Esfandiar (1995). Bakhtiari Tribe and Constitutionalism. Zarbin Publications.
- Goodarzi, Alireza (2019). ایل کلهر در دوره مشروطیت (Il-e Kalhor dar Dowre-ye Mashrutiyat; The Kalhor Tribe during the Constitutional Period) (in Persian) (2nd ed.). Kermanshah: Kermanshah Publications.
- Soltani, Mohammad Ali (1976). ایلات و طوایف کرمانشاهان (Ilat va Tavayef-e Kermanshahan; Tribes and Clans of Kermanshah) (in Persian). Vol. 2. Kermanshah.
- Esfandiari, Hadi (2019). تاریخ ایل بالاوند (Tarikh-e Il-e Balavand; History of the Balavand Tribe) (in Persian). Tehran: Arvan.
- شورش ایل کلهر و نقش سالارالدوله (Shur-e Il-e Kalhor va Naqsh-e Salar al-Dawla; The Kalhor Tribal Revolt and the Role of Salar al-Dawla) (in Persian).
- Floor, Willem (2018). Salar al-Dowleh: A Delusional Prince and Wannabe Shah. Washington, D.C.: Mage Publishers.
