= Shabakism =

Traditional religious beliefs of the Shabaks

Shabakism is the religious tradition of the Shabaks, a people native to the Nineveh Plains in Iraq. Shabakism is a form of Alevism, a branch of Ghulat Shia Islam, and has influences from other religions. Shabakism emerged during the 16th century.

== History ==
Shabakism is the ethnic religion of the Shabaks and emerged around the 16th century. Shabakism is a syncretic religion based on the Ghulat of Shia Islam, with heavy similarities to Yarsanism, Yazidism, Christianity, and Alevism. Shabakism believe in a trinity very similar to the Christian trinity, but with Allah, Muhammad, and Ali.

The religious hierarchy in Shabakism is very similar to that of Yazidism and Yarsanism, as all were based on Sufism. Shabakism, like Yarsanism, believes that haqiqah was more advanced than shariah. At the top of the Shabak religious hierarchy is the "qutb", meaning "pole" or "axis". The qutb was also called "pir piran". The qutb was seen as the truth which led to the truth, and believed to hold powers. After the qutb, there is "Al-Rind", who was characterized by utmost purity of the heart and a higher attainment of the divine mysteries. Al-Rind was not bound by religious rules and traditions. The third rank was "qalandar", who is also not bound by religious duties or the legal restrictions of the Sharia, as his attainment of heavenly favors is seen as more important than performance of supererogatory religious duties. The fourth rank was the "pir" or "murshid". The pir was usually an elder who served as the administrator of the convent or lodge, which was where Shabaks gathered. The pir has the highest spiritual authority in religious matters and leads the worship, and organizes ceremonies. The pir also grants absolution to the dervishes and other members of the community that confess their sins. The fifth rank was "dervish", who was a member of the community that completed the period of trial at the convent and has obtained a high degree of piety and spiritual knowledge, but still had relatively little authority. The sixth rank was "murid", which referred to Shabaks that wanted to become religious, but were still neophytes. Murids receive instructions from pirs or murshids, who train them mainly on asceticism, solitude, prayer, fasting, and the suppression of physical and mental desires. The lowest rank was the "muntasib" or "talib", who loved the religion but did not take a definite step to become religious and had the least knowledge.

Islamic religious duties such as salah, Ramadan fasts, zakat, and hajj, are not present in Shabakism. The Shabaks believed that salah was not a religious duty because Ali ibn Abi Talib was killed while praying. The Shabaks also do not have mosques, but prayed on Friday nights at the house of the pir. Children are not allowed to attend the prayers until they became seven years old. When a child, whether male or female, reached the age of seven, the parents took the child to the pir where they went through a process of communion. Shabaks fasted on the first ten days of Muharram. Shabaks also did not give zakat but gave one-fifth of their crops to their local sayyid. Shabaks also believed that wine was permissible. There was no gender segregation in Shabakism, and women could interact with men and enjoy the same privileges. However, religious leadership positions were reserved for men. In Shabak religious ceremonies and rituals, men and women participated together. Shabaks also believed in confession, similar to Christianity. Shabaks would confess their sins to the pir, who was the only one that was entrusted with knowing them.

In religious rituals, Shabaks will often say "Alif, Allah, Mim, Muhammad, Ayn, Ali", which is an affirmation of their trinity. Shabaks also held ceremonies dedicated to insulting Yazid ibn Muawiyah. A Shabak religious hymn recited by pirs stated "I have roamed the seven territories and the four corners and found no one as exalted as Ali. Ali is the one who created eighteen thousand worlds. He is rich and able to provide daily bread. One of his names is Ali, the other is God; praise and thanks be to God. I have not seen an exalted one except Ali. No man came to this world like Ali. Truth has been revealed by his pen, which wrote on the tablet and filled the whole world with its light. Would anyone, I wonder, who calls on Ali remain deprived? I have dived into the depth of the sea and counted the hair of the yellow bull and its company, and ascended to earth and into heaven, and found no exalted one except Ali. The high gate, wells and chambers of the Garden are made of garnet and pearls, are under the feet of Ali. Pir! Sultan! Ali is the head of the forty and one of the Abdal. Thus, my heart tells me that Ali is God and is also Muhammad."

Shabaks has holy shrines which closely resembled Yazidi holy shrines, which had a conical dome and twelve slits, representing the twelve imams. Shabaks often attended Yazidi religious ceremonies and holy shrines. The shrine called Hasan Fardosh, located near the village of Darawish, between Mosul and Bashiqa, was venerated by both Yazidis and Shabaks. Once a year, on a Friday known as Tawwafa Friday, Yazidis and Shabaks gathered at the shrine, with men and women both participating. They spent the day at the shrine where they both danced. Dancing was a common religious practice in Shabakism. Historically, the Shabaks enjoyed positive relations with the Yazidis. Despite the affinity of Shabaks with Hussein ibn Ali and the affinity of Yazidis with the Umayyad dynasty, as well as the Yazidi veneration of Yazid ibn Muawiyah, who was cursed by Shabaks, the religious differences caused no tensions between Shabaks and Yazidis. Historically, Yazidis had better relations with Shabaks than with Yarsanis. There were many instances of Yazidis being joined by Shabaks, Christians, and Muslim Kurds during Yazidi New Year celebrations. In the 1890s, Ottoman authorities humiliated Shabaks and Yazidis, often inviting them to Mosul to pressure them to convert to Islam.

In Shabakism, men grow long beards and mustaches, similar to Yarsanism and Alevism. Shabaks held marriage as sacred and the process of divorce was made extremely difficult. In Shabakism, wine was permissible. Shabak men and women both drank wine and claimed that the Quran did not explicitly forbid wine as it forbade pork. The Shabaks considered wine as one of the niceties of life, and they drank wine in their personal life and also drank it in large amounts during their religious rituals and ceremonies. They even used it to treat sicknesses. Shabaks were firmly associated with the consumption of wine or arak, and there was a saying that "He who does not drink arak has no faith or religion." Sometimes, Shabaks even gave wine to their sick horses.

The holy book of Shabakism was the Buyruk, also known as "Kitab al-Manaqib", written in Turkmen. "Buyruk" meant "commandments" in Turkmen. The Shabaks referred to it as "Burkh". Buyruks was also present among the Qizilbash, Ibrahimiyya Turkmen, Yarsani Kurds, and Alevism, both the Kurdish and Turkish variants. However, all groups were secretive about the Buyruk and were reluctant to share its contents. Despite the Turkish language being used in some religious texts and rituals, the ordinary Shabaks had no understanding of Turkish, with only some of their religious elders being able to speak it.

While Shabakism was already very similar to Yarsanism, some Shabaks adhered to Yarsanism. The Yarsani Shabaks were rarely noticed until the 1990s. Maarten Leezenberg was the first to report on the Yarsani Shabaks in the 1990s. In the Nineveh Plains, adherents of Shabakism were Shabaks, while adherents of Yarsanism were Gorani Kurds. When Leezenberg was reporting on a Yarsani religious community, he stated that many of the locals were fluent in Shabaki, Gorani, as well as Kurmanji and Sorani. He later discovered that many of the Yarsanis were not Gorani Kurds but Shabaks. Many Shabaks had adopted Yarsani beliefs. Although Yarsanism did not accept converts, the Shabaks who integrated into Yarsanism were considered full members of the Yarsani religion. Leezenberg stated that the "conversions" were simply "crossings of the low ethnic boundary" between Yarsanis and Shabaks. A Shabak who was interviewed by Leezenberg claimed that Shabaks were ethnic Kurds who spoke the Hawrami dialect. The Shabaki language is a branch of Gorani and mutually intelligible with all other Gorani dialects, also with similarities to Southern Kurdish. Historically, the Kurds in general, including Guran and Shabaks, referred to the Gorani languages as "macho", meaning "I say" in Gorani. Terms like "Shabaki", "Gorani", and "Hawrami" were rarely used. Shabaki was closest to the Gorani dialect spoken by the Yarsani Kurds of Kirkuk, and also close to Hawrami.

During the 1920s, orthodox Shia missionaries from southern Iraq began preaching to heterodox communities throughout Iraq, such as the Ibrahimiyya Turkmen and others. After the establishment of Iraq, there were pressures that threatened the Shabaks with religious assimilation or conversion. Orthodox Shia Islam entered Shabak communities through improved Iraqi state education and infrastructure programs. The propagation of Shia Islam attracted some Shabak laymen during the 1960s. The religious situation of the Shabaks became unstable. Although Shabakism was starting to be replaced by orthodox Shia Islam, not all Shabaks converted to Shia Islam. Many Shabaks joined the already significant community of Yarsani Shabaks. There was another wave of Shabak conversions to Yarsanism during the Anfal campaign, typically among Shabaks who considered Yarsanism closer to their native beliefs and fought against Arabization. A significant amount of Shabaks continued to practice Shabakism. However, Shabakism declined further after the 2003 invasion of Iraq, where Shabaks were often attacked by Sunni Islamist groups. Shabak religious leaders, including pirs and dedes, began to disappear. In addition to the attacks by Sunni Islamists, the Iraqi and Iranian governments began to promote Shia Islam to the Shabaks and encourage conversions. Shabakism declined even further when the Islamic State took the Nineveh Plains. After the Islamic State was defeated in 2017, the Nineveh Plains had a heavy presence of Iran-backed Shia militias who promoted Shia Islam, and Shabakism eventually declined. Most Shabaks were Muslim, with a significant Yarsani minority and a small Christian minority. During the early 2010s, Shabak Muslims were around 70% Shia and 30% Sunni.

Shabakism, alongside Yazidism, Yarsanism, and Kurdish Alevism, was sometimes considered part of Yazdânism, a religion proposed by Mehrdad Izady as the original Kurdish religion.

== See also ==
- Kurdish Alevism
- Sarliyya
- Yarsanism
- Yazidism
- Ibrahimiyya
- Qizilbash
- Bektashism

== Bibliography ==
- Leezenberg, Michiel (1994). "The Shabak and the Kakais: Dynamics of Ethnicity in Iraqi Kurdistan" (PDF). ILLC Research Report and Technical Notes (X) Series (X-94-07). Series editor: Dick de Jongh. Institue for Logic, Language and Computation (ILLC) - Univ. of Amsterdam.
- Leezenberg, Michiel (1997). "Between Assimilation and Deportation: the Shabak and the Kakais in Northern Iraq". In Kehl-Bodrogi, Krisztina; Kellner-Heikele, Barbara; Otter-Beaujean, Anke (eds.). Syncretistic Religious Communities in the Near East. Collected Papers of the International Symposium “Alevism in Turkey and Comparable Syncretistic Religious Communities in the Near East in the Past and Present”, Berlin, 14–17 April 1995. Brill. p. 155.
- Leezenberg, Michiel (2014). "The End of Heterodoxy? The Shabak in Post-Saddam Iraq". In Omarkhali, Khanna (ed.). Religious Minorities in Kurdistan: Beyond the Mainstream. Studies in Oriental Religions. Vol. 68. Harrassowitz. pp. 247–68. ISBN 9783447101257.
- Moosa, Matti (1987). Extremist Shiites: The Ghulat Sects (1st ed.). Syracuse, NY: Syracuse University Press. ISBN 9780815624110.
- Sevdeen, Bayar Mustafa; Schmidinger, Thomas, eds. (2019). Beyond ISIS: History and Future of Religious Minorities in Iraq. Transnational Press London. ISBN 9781912997152.
