= Nirizhi (tribe) =

Kurdish tribe

Nirizhi Nerzhi or Niriji is one of the branches of Jaff, a Kurdish nomadic confederation at west of Iran and northeast Iraq. Nirizhi is a branch of Guran Jaff which is one of the three major groups of Jaff.

== History ==
The Jaff tribe who mainly lived in the Javanrood area, and migrated seasonally to the plain of Zahab, mainly moved to the Ottoman-dominated areas of Sulaimaniyah following a battle with the governor of Ardalan in the seventeenth century, during which their supreme chief captured and killed.

But some of the branches that remained in the Javanrud area gradually moved away. The Nirizhi branch along with the Kuwaik, Taishaii, Gorg Ghaeish, Qader Mirwaisi, Kolkani, and Yusef Yarahmadi separated from the Jaff branches at the Javanrud region by the mid-nineteenth century, and joined the Guran (Kurdish tribe).

Nirizhi joined the Guran during Qajar period. The joining of Nirizhi and other branches to Guran coincided with Ardalan's domination of the Javanrud region and coincided with the repression of Qader Beyg son of Kay Khosrow Beyg Jaff. Two well known chiefs of Nirzhi are Safar-wais Sultan and Yar-wais Sultan.

== Notes ==
- Cecil J. Edmonds, Kurds, Turks and Arabs: Politics, Travel and Research in North-Eastern Iraq, 1919-1925, London, 1957. ISBN 0-404-18960-1
- Rich, Claudius James (1836). Narrative of a residence in Koordistan, and on the site of ancient Nineveh 1. Londres: James Duncan.
- Soane, Ely Banister (1914). To Mesopotamia and Kurdistan in disguise. Boston: Small, Maynard and Company.
