= Shaykh Mustafa Takhtayi =

Kurdish poet; one of the first Kurds to write in Gorani

Shaykh Mustafa Takhtayi or Shaikh Mostafa Takhti (Kurdish: شێخ مستەفا تەختەیی, romanized: Şêx Mistefa Texteyî) was a Kurdish poet from Avroman Takht who lived before 1788. His works are among the earliest samples of written Gorani school of poetry. Takhtî was the father of poet Sheikh Ahmad Takhti who was born around 1640.
