= Yazdânism =

Proposed pre-Islamic religion of the Kurds

Yazdânism, or the Cult of Angels, is a proposed pre-Islamic religion with claimed ties relating to a Mithraic religion of the Kurds. The term was introduced and proposed by Kurdish and Belgian scholar Mehrdad Izady to represent what he considers the "original" religion of the Kurds.

According to Izady, Yazdânism is now continued in the denominations of Yazidism, Yarsanism, and Kurdish Alevism. Shabakism was also included, although it later declined as a religion.

The concept of Yazdânism has found a wide perception both within and beyond Kurdish nationalist discourses, but has been disputed by other recognized scholars of Iranian religions. Well established, however, are the "striking" and "unmistakable" similarities between the Yazidis and the Yaresan or Ahl-e Haqq (People of Truth), some of which can be traced back to elements of an ancient faith that was probably dominant among Western Iranians and akin, but separate from Zoroastrianism and likened to practices of pre-Zoroastrian Mithraic religion.

== Principal beliefs ==
In Yazdâni theologies, an absolute pantheistic force (Haq or Haqq) encompasses the whole universe. It binds together the cosmos with its essence, and has entrusted the universe the heft sirr (the "Heptad", "Seven Mysteries", "Seven Angels"), who sustain universal life and can incarnate in persons, bâbâ ("Gates" or "Avatar"). These seven emanations are comparable to the seven Anunnaki aspects of Anu of ancient Mesopotamian theology, and they include Melek Tawûs (the "Peacock Angel" or "King"), who has been suggested by some scholars to be equivalent of the ancient god Dumuzi son of Enki.

Some scholar have pointed to the Iranic origin of these deities, in particular Shaykh Shams al-Din, "the sun of the faith", who is a Yezidi figure that has many features in common with the Old Iranian God Mithra, such as being associated with the Sun, playing an important role in Oaths and being involved in the annual bull sacrifice which takes place in Autumn festivals.

Pre-Islamic theology from indigenous and local Western Iranian faiths have survived in these three religions, although the expression and the vocabulary have been heavily influenced by an Arabic and Persianate Sufi lexicon.

=== Seven divine beings ===
The principal feature of Yazdânism is the belief in seven benevolent divine beings that defend the world from an equal number of malign entities. While this concept exists in its purest form in Yârsânism and Yazidism, it evolves into "seven saints/spiritual persons”. Another important feature of these religions is a doctrine of reincarnation. The belief in reincarnation has been documented among the Nusayri (Shamsi Alawites) as well.

The Yazidis believe in a single God as creator of the world, which he has placed under the care of these seven “holy beings” or angels, whose “chief” (archangel) is Melek Tawûs, the “Peacock Angel”. The Peacock Angel, as world-ruler, causes both good and bad to befall individuals, and this ambivalent character is reflected in myths of his own temporary fall from God's favor, before his remorseful tears extinguished the fires of his hellish prison and he was reconciled with God.

Melek Tawûs is sometimes identified by Muslims and Christians with Shaitan (Satan). Yazidis, however, strongly dispute this, considering him to be the leader of the archangels, not a fallen angel. According to Christine Allison:

The Yazidis of Kurdistan have been called many things, most notoriously “devil-worshippers”, a term used both by unsympathetic neighbours and fascinated Westerners. This sensational epithet is not only deeply offensive to the Yazidis themselves, but quite simply wrong.

Because of this connection to the Sufi Iblis tradition, some followers of Christianity and Islam equate the Peacock Angel with their own unredeemed evil spirit Satan, which has incited centuries of persecution of the Yazidis as ‘devil worshippers’. Persecution of Yazidis has continued in their home communities within the borders of modern Iraq, under both Saddam Hussein and fundamentalist Sunni Muslim revolutionaries. In August 2014, the Yazidis were targeted by the Islamic State of Iraq and the Levant, or ISIL, in its campaign to ‘purify’ Iraq and neighboring countries of non-Islamic influences.

=== Difference in practices from Islam ===
Yazdânis do not maintain any of the requisite five pillars of Islam; nor do they have mosques or frequent them. They also don't follow the Quran and each denomination of this religion has its own scriptures and texts that the adherents hold in a higher esteem than all other texts.

== Denominations ==
=== Yarsanism ===
From the Yarsani (sometimes also called Ahl-e Haqq or Yâresân) point of view, the universe is composed of two distinct yet interrelated worlds: the internal (batini) and the external (zahiri), each having its own order and rules. Although humans are only aware of the outer world, their lives are governed according to the rules of the inner world. Among other important pillars of their belief system are that the Divine Essence has successive manifestations in human form, (mazhariyyat, derived from zahir) and the belief in transmigration of the soul (or dunaduni in Kurdish). The Yarsani do not observe Muslim rites and rituals.

The term "Haqq" (as in Ahl-e Haqq) is often misrepresented and misinterpreted as the Arabic term for "Truth". Instead, its true meaning is clearly explained by Nur Ali Elahi (died 1974) – as being "distinct from the Arabic term and in fact, should be written as "Hâq" ("Hâq-i wâqi'") instead of "Haqq" and should be understood to be different in meaning, connotation, and essence."

=== Yazidism ===
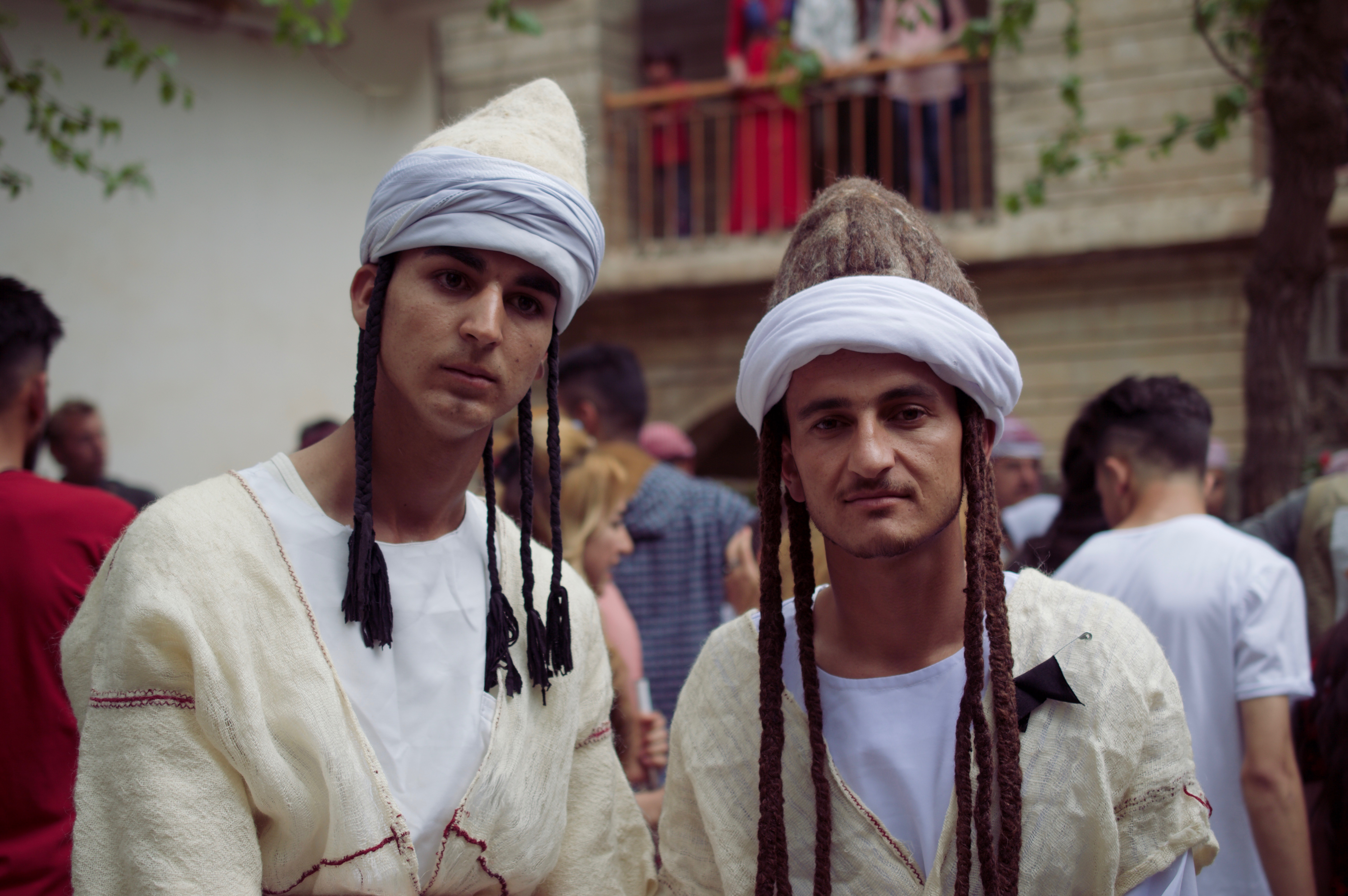
Yazidi men in traditional Shingali clothes

Yazidis, who have much in common with the followers of Yarsanism, state that the universe created by God was at first a pearl. It remained in this very small and enclosed state for some time (often a magic number such as forty or forty thousand years) before being remade in its current state. During this period the Heptad were called into existence, God made a covenant with them and entrusted the world to them. Besides Tawûsê Melek, members of the Heptad (the Seven), who were called into existence by God at the beginning of all things, include Şêx Hasan, Şêxobekir and the four brothers, known as the Four Mysteries: Shamsadin, Fakhradin, Sajadin and Naserdin.

== Reception ==
Izady proposes the term as denoting a belief system which "predates Islam by millennia" which is in its character "Aryan" rather than "Semitic".

Instead of suggesting that the Muslim Kurds are Yazdânis, Izady suggests that Yazdâni Kurds are not Muslim, and identify themselves as such only to avoid harm and discrimination.

The view on non-Islamic identity of the Yazdânis is shared by Mohammad Mokri, the well-known Kurdish folklorist and historian, who states this religion to be "less Islamic than Baháʼísm", which had emerged from Bábism as "a new non-Islamic religion".

=== Criticism ===
The concept of Yazdânism as a distinct religion has been disputed by a number of scholars. Richard Foltz considers Yazdânism, or the “Cult of Angels”, to be "fabricated," and as an “invented religion”, which according to Foltz “owes more to contemporary Kurdish national sentiment than to actual religious history.”

Iranian anthropologist Ziba Mir-Hosseini states:

The most notable case is that of Izady (1992) who, in his eagerness to distance the Ahl-e Haqq from Islam and to give it a purely Kurdish pedigree, asserts that the sect is a denomination of a religion of great antiquity which he calls “the Cult of Angels”. This 'Cult', he states, is "fundamentally a non-Semitic religion, with an Aryan superstructure overlaying a religious foundation indigenous to the Zagros. To identify the Cult or any of its denominations as Islamic is simply a mistake born of a lack of knowledge of the religion, which pre-dates Islam by millennia."

== See also ==
- Mithra
- Mithraism
- Paganism
- Alians
- Babai Revolt
- Bektashi Order
- Druze
- Fire worship
- Ghulat
- Gnosticism
- Hurufiyya
- Isma'ilism
- Kurdification
- Kurdish mythology
- Luwian mythology
- Mandaeism
- Manichaeism
- Mazdakism
- Nizārī
- Nuqtavi
- Proto-Indo-European religion
- Proto-Indo-Iranian religion
- Shabakism
- Sun-worship
- Zoroastrianism
- Zurvanism
