= Mehrdad Izady =

Kurdish author and scholar

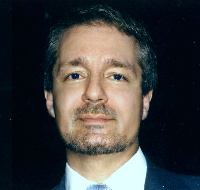
Merhdad Izady

Michael Mehrdad R.S.C. Izady or Michael Izady (born 1963), a contemporary writer on ethnic and cultural topics, particularly the Greater Middle East, and Kurds.

== Early life and education ==
Izady was born to a Kurdish father and a Belgian mother, and spent much of his youth in Iraq, Iran, Afghanistan and Korea, as his diplomat parents moved from one assignment to another. He received his BA degree in history, political science and geography from the University of Kansas, and then attended Syracuse University, where he received two master's degrees in remote sensing-cartography and in international relations. He received his PhD at the department of Middle Eastern Languages and Civilizations of Columbia University in 1992.

== Career ==
Izady taught for six years in the Department of Near Eastern Languages and Civilizations at Harvard University and in the Department of Middle Eastern Studies and History at the Joint Special Operations University in Florida. He has testified before two US Congressional Committees and has authored many books and articles on Middle East and Southeast European subjects. He has been a part-time faculty at the Department of History at Fordham University, New York Institute of Technology and Pace University since 2001. He also continues his educational services to the US military, diplomatic corps and the NATO. Since 1997, he has also been a Master Adjunct professor at the Joint Special Operations University, Florida.

Izady is also an ethnographer who has produced work on ethno-cultural topics of the Old World. His annotated cartographic works have been used by the atlases, authors, the international media—to include the National Geographic, The Economist as well as the US military, the UN and various other entities. Some of his work included in the Atlas of the Islamic World and Vicinity can be found at Columbia University School of International and Public Affairs, Gulf 2000 Project web site.

== Criticism ==
The Kurdologist and Iranologist Garnik Asatrian, narrating about pseudo-history in Kurdology, refers to Izady's 1992 The Kurds: A Concise Handbook as "phantasmagoric".

The Iranologist Richard Foltz notes: "The alleged pan-Kurdish proto-religion called 'Yazdanism' is a fabrication of contemporary Kurdish scholar Mehrdad Izady".

== Books ==
- The Kurds: A Concise Handbook, Taylor & Francis Publishers, pp. 268, 1992. ISBN 0-8448-1727-9
- The Sharafnâma, or, the History of the Kurdish Nation, 1597, By Sharaf al-Din Bitlisi, translated into English and annotated by M. Izady, Mazda Publishers, pp. 302, 2005. ISBN 1-56859-074-1
- Guidebook to Iraq. pp. 243, US military, 2005–present, 19th edition.
- Guidebook to Afghanistan. pp. 219, US military, 2005–present, 21st edition.
- Guidebook to the Balkans. pp. 244, US military, 2007–present, 21st edition.
- Atlas of the Islamic World and Vicinity, Columbia University, 2006–Present (an ongoing project)

== Book chapters ==
- "Between Iraq and a Hard Place: The Kurdish Predicament", pp. 71–99 in Iran, Iraq and the Legacies of War, Edited by Lawrence G. Potter, Gary G. Sick, Pekgrave Macmillan, pp. 224, 2006. ISBN 1-4039-7609-0
- "Kurds", Encyclopedia of the Developing World, Routledge Publishers, pp. 1759, 2006. ISBN 1-57958-388-1
- "Kurds and the Formation of the State of Iraq, 1917–1932", pp. 95–109, in The Creation of Iraq, 1914–1921, Edited by Reeva S. Simon, Eleanor Harvey Tejirian, Columbia University Press, pp. 181, 2004. ISBN 0-231-13292-1
- "Gulf and Indian Ocean Basin Ethnic Diversity: An Evolutionary History" in Security in the Persian Gulf: Origins, Obstacles and the Search for Consensus, Edited by G. Sick and L. Potter, Palgrave Press, pp. 284, 2002. ISBN 0-312-23950-5.
- "The Geopolitical Realities of Kurdistan vs. Hopes for a New World Order" in Altered States: A Reader in the New World Order, Edited by Phyllis Bennis, Michel Moushabeck, Interlink Pub Group Inc, pp. 538, 1998. ISBN 1-56656-112-4
- "The Kurdish Demographic Revolution and Its Socio-Political Implications" in Contrasts and Solutions in the Middle East, Edited by Ole Høiris, Sefa Martin Yürükel, Aarhus University Press, pp. 562, 1997. ISBN 87-7288-691-9
- "E uno plurium?: A Projection on the Future of the National Minorities and their Identity in the 21st-Century" in The Transnationalization of Ethnicity and World Politics, Edited by J. Cole and E. Skinner, Ralph J. Bunche International Affairs Center, Howard University, 1995.
