= Shabaks =

Minority group in Iraq

Shabak
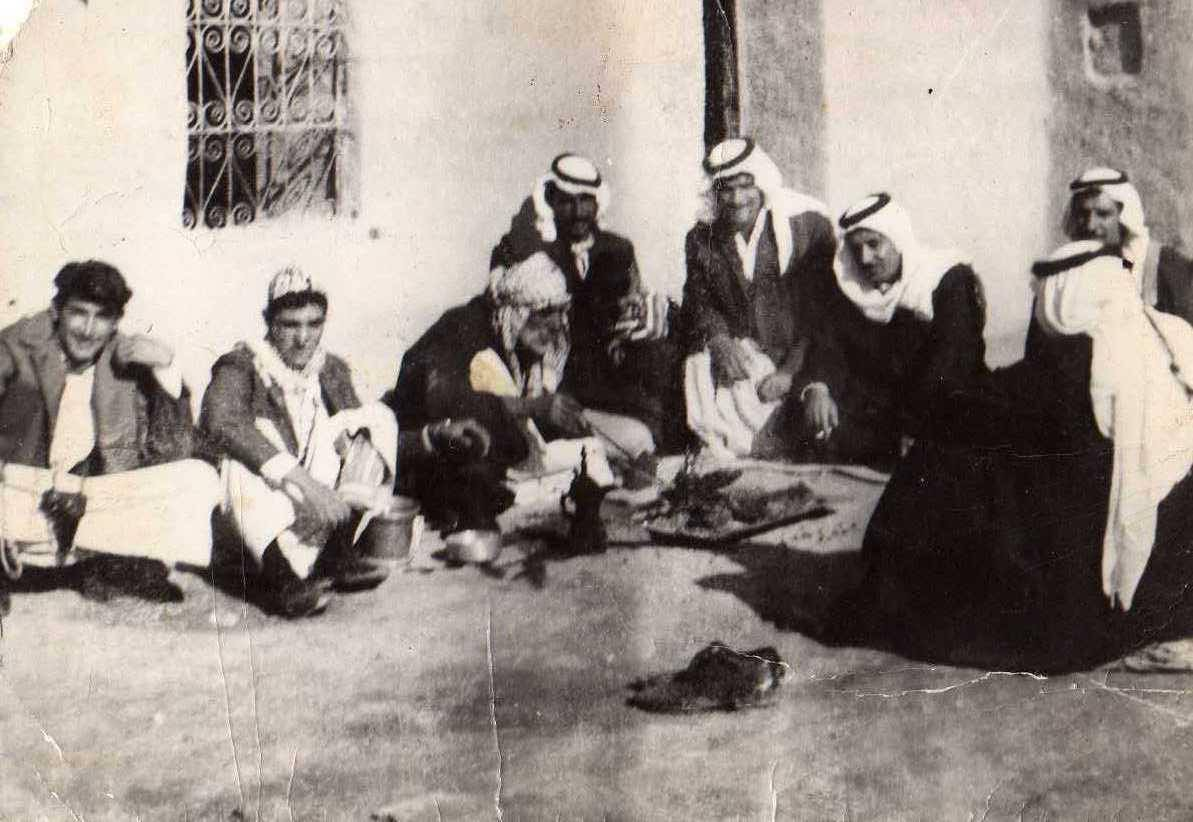

Total population
- 200,000–500,000 (2017 estimation)

Regions with significant populations
- Native: Nineveh Plains and Mosul; Diaspora: Iraqi Kurdistan, southern Iraq, and Baghdad

Languages
- Shabaki, Kurdish (Kurmanji, Sorani), Arabic

Religion
- Majority: Shia Islam; Minority: Sunni Islam, Yarsanism, and Christianity; Historically: Shabakism

Shabaks (Arabic: الشبك, Kurdish: شەبەک, romanized: Şebek) are an ethnic group that inhabit the Nineveh Plains in Iraq. They speak Shabaki, a Northwestern Iranian language belonging to the Shabaki-Bajelani subgroup of the Gorani group. They largely follow Shia Islam. Their ethnic origin is uncertain and disputed, although they were largely considered Kurds by scholars.

== History ==
According to the Encyclopedia of Islam, the Shabak were a heterodox religious community which commonly considered itself Kurdish and lived in several dozen villages east of Mosul, in a triangle bounded by the Tigris and the Greater Zab. Their population was estimated around 10,000 in 1925, and the 1960 Iraqi census estimated 15,000 Shabaks in 35 villages. At the beginning of the 21st century, the Shabak population was estimated between 100,000 and 500,000.

It was unclear when the Shabaks emerged as a distinctive group, and their historic use of multiple languages gave rise to several contradictory claims about their origin, most commonly Kurdish or Turkoman, or even Arab, and both the Kurds and Turkmens claimed them as part of their ethnicity. Some claimed the name of the Shabak meant "to intertwine" in Arabic and that the Shabak consisted of groups of different origins. Others added that the Shabaks from the Tay, Juhaysh, and Jubur tribes were of Arab origin, those from the Bayat tribe were of Turkmen origin, and those of the Bajalan, Zangana, Zaza, Dawudi, and Rojbayani were of Kurdish origin, but all of them were linked by the Shabak culture and collective identity. The Mamusi tribe contained both Shabak and Yazidi members although they could not intermarry.

The traditional religion of the Shabaks was closely related to Anatolian Alevism. A Shabak invocation given by Al-Sarraf explicitly claimed Haji Bektash and the adepts of Ardabil (the Safavids) as the founders of their spiritual path. Some Shabak religious poems were attributed to Shah Ismail and Pir Sultan Abdal. A basic tenet of traditional Shabak religion was the belief that Allah and Muhammad and Ali constituted a trinity, in which Ali appeared as the dominant manifestation of the divine. The sacred book of the Shabak was known as Kitab al-Manaqib, also known as the Buyruk, which the Shabaks pronounced as Burukh. The Shabak were often described as descendants of Kurdish elements of the Qizilbash.

The native language of most Shabaks was a variant of Gorani. The religious language of the Shabak was Turkic, and most Shabaks were historically multilingual, which gave rise to some claims that they were really Turkmen or Kurdish speakers or even Arabs. The Shabaks called their dialect Shabaki or Macho, and it was similar but distinct from the Bajalani dialect of Gorani. Shabaki and Bajalani were close to the Gorani spoken by the Kaka'is near Kirkuk, and to the varieties known as Hawrami, spoken in Hawraman. They were all labelled Gorani, although Leezenberg during his 1992 survey noted that none of the speakers collectively referred to the dialects as Gorani. Many Shabaks additionally spoke Kurmanji and Sorani, as well as Arabic.

The Safavid-Qizilbash religious affiliation of the Shabaks historically distinguished them from their neighbors, such as the Yazidis to the north and the Sarliyya to the southeast. The Sarliyya were a Yarsani community like the Kaka'is, and spoke a Gorani dialect similar to the Shabaks. They also celebrated Laylat al-Kafsha like the Shabaks. The Bajalan, also known as Bajwan, also lived near the Shabaks and were sometimes said to be part of the Shabak or vice-versa. The Bajalan were tribally organized while the Shabaks were non-tribal. The Bajalan were also Sunni while the Shabak were heterodox Shia. Some claimed that the Bajalan were part of the Shabak. Some Bajalan were considered Shabak while others were not. During his 1992 survey of the region, Leezenberg visited a Sarli community which referred to themselves as Ibrahimi Kaka'is and were under the Kaka'i leader Fattah Agha. A significant number of Shabaks had become Kaka'i and accepted the patronage of Fattah Agha. Many of the Shabaks who became Kaka'i were Kurdish nationalists and saw it as closer to their true beliefs and wanted to resist Arabization. The Sarliyya beliefs were claimed to be intermediary between the beliefs of the Shabaks and Kaka'i. Shabaks and Yazidis historically celebrated holidays together and had good relations despite being at odds theologically. In the 1890s, the Ottoman general Omer Vehbi Pasha humiliated many Yazidi and Shabak (called "Shebekli" in the official documents) leaders by inviting them to Mosul and then forcing them to publicly convert to the Hanafi school of Sunni Islam.

In the 1920s, many Shabaks were Arabized as they moved to Mosul for opportunities, and they left their traditional faith and converted to orthodox Shia Islam. The Shabaks began to disintegrate at the beginning of the Iraqi republican period. In the 1970s, the Iraqi government began an Arabization campaign targeting the Shabaks, and around 20 Shabak villages were destroyed in 1988. In the early 1980s, some Shabak leaders joined the National Defence Battalions, although as the Kurdish insurgency intensified throughout the Iran–Iraq War, the Iraqi government targeted the Shabaks, with special orders to target the Shabaks who joined the NDB. In September 1988, some 22 Shabak villages were evacuated and destroyed by the fifth division of the Iraqi army in the Mosul area, with over 3,000 Shabaks relocating to camps around Erbil. Those Shabak lands were leased to Arabs from southern Iraq, while rich Arabs from Mosul city had bought some twelve Shabak villages and the lands surrounding them, and had settled Arab farmers there. In the 1987 census, the government registered the Shabaks as Arabs, and deported the Shabaks who protested and claimed they were Kurdish. In the 1990s, nationalist circles in Turkey aimed at countering Kurdish gains after the establishment of Kurdish autonomy during the 1991 Iraqi uprisings. They began making greater and more inflated claims about the Iraqi Turkmen and Turkmeneli, arguing that if the Kurds gained an autonomous region, the Turkmen deserved one as well. They claimed the heterodox Shia groups in northern Iraq, like the Shabak, the Bajalan, the Sarli and the Kaka'i as unambiguously Turkmen. Turkey-backed Iraqi Turkmen nationalist groups claimed that they were Turkmen due to their usage of the Turkish language. While some Kaka'i laymen near Tawuq some Turkmen, most of them spoke Gorani, and the Shabaks also spoke Gorani with only religious specialists knowing Turkish. In the early and mid-1990s in Iraqi Kurdistan, due to the Turkish-backed organizations like the Iraqi National Turcoman Party (Irak Milli Türkmen Partisi, IMTP) and the Turkish Red Crescent were said to have taken advantage of the humanitarian crisis and supplied financial support and food aid to locals only on the condition that they sign a document stating that they were Turkmen. Kurdish authorities acknowledged that these practices occurred, but stated they could not stop them. With the Oil for Food program in 1997 and the overthrow of Saddam Hussein in 2003, the economic situation of Iraqi Kurdistan gradually improved. The IMTP fell into oblivion in the 1992 elections. The efforts at Turkification stopped shortly after as they never had a lasting effect. Many Shabaks began to see themselves more unambiguously as Kurds and less as a distinct subgroup due to the persecution they endured under the Ba'athist government, as they felt like they were targeted for being Kurds.

After 2003, the Shabaks were divided in politics, with subsequent elections showing that a slight majority aligned with Shia political groups, despite occasional odds, while a large minority wanted to join the Kurdistan Region, despite past misgivings with the KDP. A smaller minority were Shabak nationalists asserting distinctness from both. Also after 2003, Mosul was governed by an Arab nationalist coalition, and the Shabaks had largely been left exposed to the violence of local insurgent groups. After 2003, and especially after 2006, hundreds of Shabaks were targeted for their Shia affiliation and were kidnapped or killed. After the US assault on nearby Fallujah in November 2004, there was a massive by the Mosul police force, consisting mostly of Sunni Arabs. Insurgents captured many of the weapons. The US had to call the Peshmerga to Mosul, and the situation escalated especially in 2006, with Kurdish and other minorities being targeted and thousands of civilians leaving Mosul after receiving death threats. Between 2003 and 2009, at least 675 Shabaks were killed in terrorist attacks. Shabaks blamed Atheel al-Nujaifi for creating a hostile environment for them in Mosul which led to them being targeted.

After 2003, the new Shia-dominated Iraqi government maintained the Ba'athist policy of distinguishing Shabaks from Kurds. The KRG did not recognize a distinct Shabak identity and considered them simply Kurds. Many Shabaks also became culturally and linguistically Arabized. Shabaks had tensions with Sunni Arabs, which was worsened by Saddam Hussein, and further worsened by the rise of the Islamic State in 2014. During the 2017 Kurdistan independence referendum, some Shabak politicians such as Salim Juma'a supported independence and called for their region in the Nineveh Plains to be included, while others such as Waad Qaddo were more critical.

By the early 20th century, with the founding of the Iraqi state, the Shabaks increasingly shifted from their traditional religion to orthodox Shia Islam. However, not all of them became Muslim, as some became Yarsani. They were majority Shia by the 21st century. After the war on the Islamic State, the Shabaks were estimated at around 70% Shias, with the rest being Sunnis and a few Christians. Religion was a factor in the identification of Shabaks. The Shia Shabaks were divided between those who identified as Kurds and those who identified as a separate group, while the Sunni and Yarsani Shabaks identified as Kurds. Some of them migrated to the KRG and integrated well. The Shabaks who identified as Kurds sided with the KRG and mostly supported the KDP. The Shabaks who identified as a distinct ethnic group supported the Iran-backed militias.

== Settlements ==
List of Shabak–majority settlements in the Nineveh Plains:

- Abbasiyah
- Ali Rash
- Badanat Sufla
- Badanat Ulya
- Basakhrah
- Basatliya Saghirah
- Baybukh
- Bazgirtan
- Bazwaya
- Chunji
- Darawish
- Dayrij
- Gogjali
- Gora Ghariban
- Judaydat
- Kahriz
- Khazna
- Kiretagh / Qaraytagh
- Manara Shabak
- Mufti
- Qara Shor
- Qara Tappa
- Sadah
- Salamiyah
- Shaqoli
- Shahrazad
- Sheikh Amir
- Tahrawa
- Tawajinah
- Terjilleh
- Tiskharab

List of mixed settlements in the Nineveh Plains:

- Abu Jarwan (Shabak–Bajalan Kurdish)
- Bartella (Shabak–Assyrian)
- Basatliya (Shabak–Kurdish)
- Bashbitah (Mixed Kurdish)
- Bashiqa (Shabak–Yezidi)
- Bir Hallan (Mixed Kurdish)
- Birma (Mixed Kurdish)
- Fadila (Mixed Kurdish)
- Hasan Shami (Mixed Kurdish–Arab)
- Jilu Khan (Mixed Kurdish)
- Kabarli (Mixed Kurdish)
- Kanunah (Mixed Kurdish)
- Kharabat Sultan (Mixed Kurdish)
- Khorsabad (Mixed Kurdish)
- Orta Kharab (Mixed Kurdish)
- Bakhdida / Qaraqosh / Hamdaniyah (Assyrian-Shabak)
- Qarqashah (Mixed Kurdish)
- Shamsiyat (Shabak–Turkmen)
- Summaqiyah (Mixed Kurdish)
- Tall Akub (Mixed Kurdish)
- Tallara (Mixed Kurdish)
- Topzawah (Mixed Kurdish)
- Tubraq Ziyarah (Mixed Kurdish)
- Umar Qabji (Mixed Kurdish)
- Umarkan (Mixed Kurdish)
- Yangija (Mixed Kurdish)
- Yarimjah (Shabak–Turkmen)
- Zara Khatun (Mixed Kurdish)

As of March 2019, all of the above settlements are under federal control and are disputed territories of Northern Iraq.
