= Buyruk (Shabak) =

Holy book of the Shabak people of Iraq

The Buyruk or Kitab al-Manaqib (Book of Exemplary Acts) is the central religious text of Shabakism. It is written in Turkmen.

The Buyruk is written in the form of an interlocution between Shaykh Safi-ad-din Ardabili, founder of the Safaviyya order, and his son Sadr al-Dīn Mūsā on different religious matters, and particularly on the life and principles of the Sufi order. It also contains poems composed by Shah Ismail I under the pseudonym 'Khatai', which indicates it must have been compiled in the sixteenth century at the earliest.
