= Ibrahimiyya =

Extinct Ghulat sect of Shia Islam

Ibrahimiyya (Arabic: الإبراهيمية; Turkish: İbrahimiyye) was a Ghulat sect of Shia Islam in Iraq. Ibrahimiyya was made up of Iraqi Turkmen around Talafar. It emerged when the Safavids first captured Iraq, and it dissolved in the 1920s after its adherents gradually converted to mainstream Twelver Shia Islam.

== History ==
Ibrahimiyya emerged in Talafar, which became its stronghold. Its adherents were all Iraqi Turkmen. It emerged right after the first time the Safavids conquered Iraq. Ibrahimiyya originated from the heterodox Qizilbash beliefs, and had similarities with the Safavi order, Bektashism, Alevism, Alawites, and Yarsanism. Ibrahimiyya was considered a Ghulat sect. Ibrahimiyya venerated Moses and Reuben as men most trusted by Ali, and believed that Moses and Reuben were killed by Zoroastrians at the time of the Muslim conquest of Persia. Ibrahimiyya believed in the Haqq–Muhammad–Ali trinity. Ibrahimiyya was also described as a Sufi order. The holy book of Ibrahimiyya was the Buyruk, although different from the Buyruk of Shabakism. They were written in the same language, although the Ibrahimiyya version of the Buyruk contained content that was not present in the Shabak version of the Buyruk, including a brief biography of Sheikh Safiaddin and some hymns composed by Shah Ismail and other Qizilbash poets. In some parts, the Ibrahimiyya version was more detailed than the Shabak version. The Ibrahimiyya were a faction of the heterodox Iraqi Turkmen Shias, who were isolated from the orthodox Iraqi Turkmen Shias. They were generally very secretive about their religion. In the 1920s, Twelver Shia missionaries from Southern Iraq began to proselytise the heterodox Twelver Shias across the country, and the Ibrahimiyya gradually converted to orthodox Shia Islam.
