= Sanjâbi (tribe) =

Kurdish tribe in Iran and Iraq

The Sanjâbi or Senjâwi (Kurdish: سنجاوی, Sincawî, Persian: سنجابی) are a large Kurdish tribe mainly living around Kermanshah province in Iran and adjacent areas in Iraq. The Sanjabi dialect is a branch of Southern Kurdish. The Sanjabi tribe is religiously divided among Yarsanis and Muslims of both the Sunni and Shia sects.

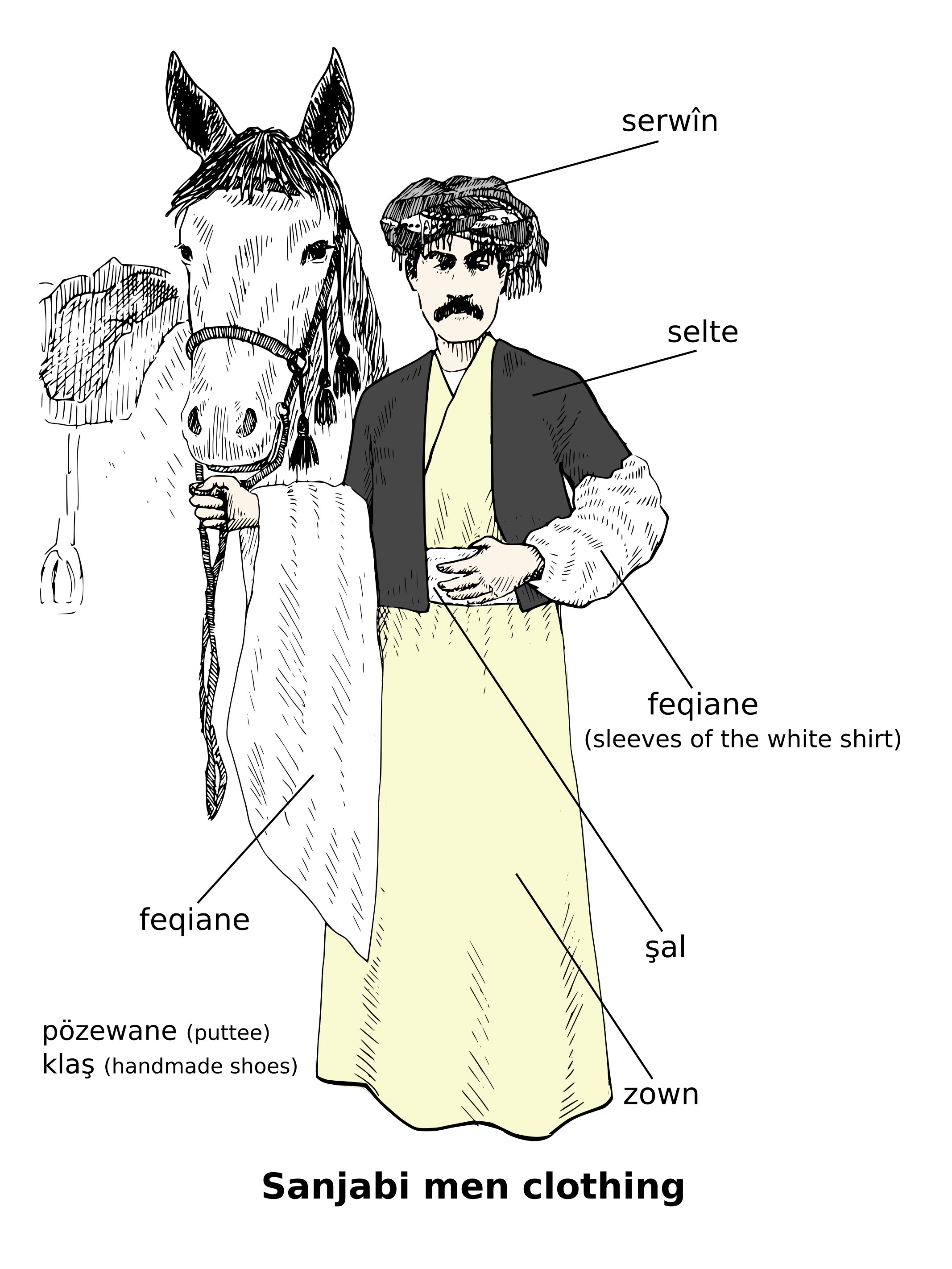
Sanjabi men clothing

== History ==
According to the Encyclopaedia of Islam, there initially existed numerous families of diverse origins in the Khorasan region led by the Chalabi (Chalawi) family from Fars which claimed descent from the Shabankara Kurds who descended from the Sasanians. In other versions, they descended from the Daylamites. At the time of Nader Shah, the Chalabi migrated to the western borderlands of Iran, and were followed by the Abbaswand, Khordadasta, Jalilwand, Sorkhaki, Sorkhawand, Daliyan, Dawlatmand, Dastaja, Darkhor, Sufi, and Aliwali, and some clans which later dissolved such as Rahbarwand, Wotkawand, Biwajashniyan, and Mojrelan. The Sanjabi tribe emerged in western Iran and was considered a Kurdish tribe. The "-wand" suffix implied that some tribes from Lorestan mingled with the Sanjabi tribes. Some of them might have been in the region before the arrival of the other Sanjabi tribes, after which they joined them. The Jalilwand were a Yarsani Lak tribe in Kermanshah and Luristan, many of which migrated to Qazvin in the early 20th century, while those remaining at Dinavar became part of the Sanjabi.

The first mention of the Sanjabi tribe was in the late 18th century, although the individual tribes within it were much older. The name of the Sanjabi tribe likely came from "sanjab", meaning "squirrel" in Persian, which was given to the tribe after their participation in the First Herat War in 1838 in which the British used rebellious tribes to separate Herat from Iran. The Sanjabi horsemen, numbering 200, while besieging Herat, were dressed in tunics made of squirrel fur and were called Sanjabi afterwards. At that time, the Sanjabi tribe had been part of the Zangana, before later joining the Guran, and later becoming independent. Some of the Sanjabi were assimilated among the tribes of Delfan in Lorestan.

The Sanjabi tribe lived mostly in Kermanshah province near the Kalhor and Guran tribes. Some of the tribe also lived across the border in Iraq, mainly Khanaqin, while more of their land was given to the Ottomans in 1914 which later became Iraq. The Sanjabi tribe historically protected the western border of Iran from mainly the Ottomans but also the Russians and British. The Sanjabi tribe had Sunni, Shia, and Yarsani members, which all lived together in each village with tolerance, and the Sanjabi were historically the only Kurdish tribe to successfully assimilate the three religions within its members. However, its lineage of chiefs was historically Shia. The Sanjabi tribe spoke Southern Kurdish, and their dialect was especially close to that of the Kalhor and Zangana tribes.

Salar al-Dawla, who sought the support of Kurdish and Lur tribes for his planned coup, began his revolt in Sanandaj in July 1911. He then convinced the Kalhor and Sanjabi tribes, who were in a fierce rivalry and conflict, to reconcile, and Dawud Khan Kalhor removed Karim Khan Bajilan from governance of Qasr-e Shirin and gave it to Shir Mohammad Khan Sanjabi. Dawud Khan intimidated the rest of the tribes of Kermanshah into supporting Salar al-Dawla and also extorted the merchants. Dawud Khan and many Kalhors were killed by government forces when they marched on Tehran with Salar al-Dawla, who survived and fled to Luristan and continued unsuccessfully trying to incite revolts until he was also killed. The Kalhor then made peace with their former rival tribes and the Sanjabi gained undisputed ascendancy over the tribes of Kermanshah, although the situation was still unstable.

In December 1917, when the British invaded Qasr-e Shirin, the Sanjabi refused to violate Iranian neutrality and instead cooperated with the Germans, after which the British began supporting the Kalhor and Guran tribes which took it as their chance to rob the Sanjabi, which suffered significant casualties and economic losses. By 1920, the Sanjabi recovered, while the Guran were breaking up and the Kalhor had a leadership crisis. In 1921, Qasim Khan Sanjabi, who had good ties with the British, made an alliance with Rashid al-Saltana Qalkhani and Sardar Rashid Ardalani to finally confront the Weledbegi tribe, which often stole Sanjabi livestock. The Weledbegi then took refuge with the Kalhor, and together they had the advantage, with the Iranian government in Tehran ordering the Kalhor to punish the Sanjabi, although the new governor of Kermanshah intervened to prevent any fighting. The British also prevented another conflict between the Kalhor and Sanjabi.

When Reza Shah came to power and began a campaign against the tribes, the Sanjabi revolted and were severely suppressed. Under Reza Shah, the tribe suffered and declined in power, and were also forced to settle, although some returned to nomadism after Reza Shah was abdicated in 1941.

The last great leader of the Sanjabi tribe was Shir Mohammad Khan Sanjabi, who was succeeded by his three sons, Ali Akbar Khan, Qasim Khan, and Hosayn Khan, who continued his activities. The best known of the three sons was Ali Akbar Khan. Ali Akbar Khan, the Sanjabi leader, and the Sanjabi and Guran tribes, were actively interfering with the passage of supplies to Khanaqin. In April 1918, Kalhor and Qalkhani tribesmen, supported by the British column, defeated and dispersed the forces of Ali Akbar Khan, who had been cooperating with the Persian Democrat Sulayman Mirza and at the same time intriguing with German and Turkish agents. When Sulayman Mirza was captured by a British column and dispatched to Baghdad, Ali Akbar Khan stayed in contact with German and Turkish agents. He was last reported to have spoke with the German agent Von Drueffel about arming the Sanjabi and other Kurdish tribes with rifles for action against the British. He had fled after being wounded in clashes with the British and eventually lapsed into innocuous inactivity. Ali Akbar Khan was frequently imprisoned and later exiled to Tehran under house arrest where he died in 1935. The properties of Qasim Khan were taken and he was exiled to Qazvin where he died in 1950. Hosayn Khan, the youngest, had survived the repressions of Reza Shah and fled to Russia in 1930 but was killed in the Stalinist purges. Karim Sanjabi, the son of Hosayn Khan, held several high government positions, and was the Minister of Foreign Affairs at the time of the 1979 Islamic revolution when he retired and exiled himself.

== Sources ==
- Mokri, M. (1997). "Sind̲j̲ābī". In Bosworth, C. E.; van Donzel, E.; Heinrichs, W. P. & Lecomte, G. (eds.). The Encyclopaedia of Islam, Second Edition. Volume IX: San–Sze. Leiden: E. J. Brill. pp. 641–643. ISBN 978-90-04-10422-8.
- Karim Sanjabi, Hopes and Despairs: The Political Memoirs, London, 1989 (in Persian)
- علی اکبر خان، سردار مقتدر سنجابی. ایل سنجابی و مجاهدت‌های ملی ایران. تحریر و تحشیه دکتر کریم سنجابی. تهران: نشر شیرازه، 1380 ISBN 964-6578-91-8
