= Guran (tribe) =

Kurdish tribe

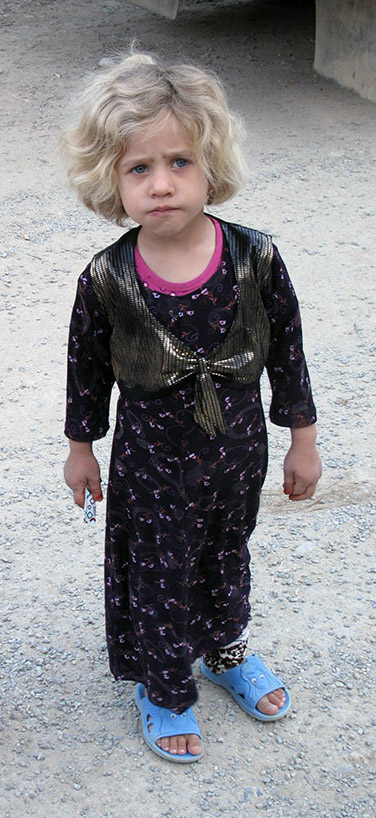
A Gurani child in Kurdish costume

Guran (or Goran; Kurdish: گوران) is a Kurdish tribe in Kermanshah province, Iran. One of their main historical centers is Dartang, a region whose capital is at Rijab, at the western end of the gorge where the Alwand River enters into the Zohab plain. The other one is Darneh, located east of Dalahu in the Zimkan valley.

== Name ==
In both Gurani and Kurdish, the usual pronunciation is Gūrān. An earlier form, Gōrān, is preserved in the Turkish version of the name, Göran. Ultimately, Vladimir Minorsky reconstructed the original tribal name as *Gāubārakān, related to the word gāubāra meaning "ox rider" or "bull rider". This name then through a series of regular sound changes: *Gāubārakān > Gāurakān > *Gōrakān > Gōrān > Gūrān.

A separate word pronounced Gūrān also exists; it refer to the social class of peasants. This word has a completely different origin and is derived from the word gabrān, referring to Zoroastrians. After the Islamic conquest, the term gabrān also came to mean "subjects" because Zoroastrians formed a subject population. The word then went through another series of regular sound changes to become *gaurān and then gōrān, at which point it became a homophone of the tribal name (then Gōrān). As a result, there are many Kurds with the surname "Guran" or "Goran" that have no connection to the Guran tribe.

== History ==
Minorsky identified a possible ancient reference to the Guran in a passage written by Strabo that refers to a people called the "Guranii" (Greek: Γουράνιοι Gouránioi) who lived "beyond Armenia", near the Medes. This ethnic group may also be behind the name of the Sasanian prince Kūrān-Shāh (a son of Khosrow II) as well as the medieval Georgian female given name Gurandukht. However, the Guranii may have been a different group than today's Guran, since the proposed original name *Gāubārakān seems unlikely to have already changed to the modern form Gūrān at that point.

According to Minorsky, the origins of the Guran were likely somewhere in the Caspian provinces. For example, the 7th-century king of Tabaristan, Gil Gavbara, had a similarly derived name, and Hamdallah Mustawfi also mentioned a plain called Gavbari near the Kur estuary, where the medieval town of Mahmudabad was built.

The name "Gilan" is also associated with a river in the modern Guran territory. Minorsky hypothesized that the ancestors of the Guran may have migrated to the Zagros region under the Sasanians, who may have encouraged this as a way of securing the ties between Iran and Mesopotamia.

An early reference to the Guran may be in the works of the late 9th-century geographer Ibn Khurradadhbih, who mentioned "the revenue of Hulwan together with the Jābār.qa and the Kurds". Some manuscripts spell the name Kābār.ka instead. Minorsky interpreted this variation as representing an underlying form *Gābār.ka, which he said referred to "the ancestors of the Guran". A century later, al-Mas'udi also mentioned a tribe called Jābār.qī in his list of the Kurdish tribes of al-Jibal.

The Guran appear frequently in the annals of the Hasanwayhid dynasty under the spelling Jūraqān. In 1014, members of the Guran killed the powerful Badr ibn Hasanwayh, who they had been allied with during a winter campaign but grew disgruntled with.

A later description of these events, by the anonymous author of the 12th-century Mujmal al-tavārīkh, consistently uses the modern name Gūrānān instead of Jūraqān and also adds that the Guran had been the closest to Badr of all his allied tribes before turning against him and killing him. Minorsky noted the Mujmal's detail that the Guran killed Badr with javelins, a weapon historically associated with the Daylamites of the Caspian region.

Several events in Ibn Athir's chronicles for the early 11th century indicate that at least some of the Guran were living in northern Luristan. For example, in 1026, the Kakuyid emir Ala al-Dawla Muhammad grouped the Guran together with Saburkhwast (present-day Khorramabad) under a single governor. The governor's deputy who directly oversaw the Guran was Abu'l-Faraj Bābūnī, who was himself related to the Guran. Later in 1046, when Ibrahim Inal captured Hamadan from the Kakuyid emir Garshasp I, Garshasp initially took refuge with the Guran. Inal is then described as attacking Gurani Kurds in the vicinity of Saymarah, prompting Garshasp to flee to Hoveyzeh in Khuzestan.

Around 1343, the Guran are mentioned in Shihab ad-Din al-Umari's description of the Kurdish tribes. He referred to them as "powerful and bellicose" and composed of "soldiers and peasants", and listed two places they lived: Rāwst, led by an amir named Muhammad, and Dartang. In later centuries, Dartang would become known as one of the main centers of the Guran; this mid-14th century account is the earliest definite mention of them in connection with their historical homeland. Wherever Rāwst was is unknown, although Minorsky speculated that it could have referred to "the habitat of the more easterly branch of the Guran".

In the introduction to his 1596 History of the Kurds, the famous Kurdish historian Sharaf Khan Bidlisi wrote that there were four branches of the Kurds: Kurmanj, Lur, Kalhur, and Guran. He wrote that at his time, most of the Guran lived under the Kalhur and Ardalan. However, despite the important status he ascribed to the Guran, Sharaf Khan's references to them are relatively infrequent and somewhat muddled.

According to Henry Rawlinson, the Kalhur were deposed as rulers of the Zohab region by the Ottoman sultan Murad IV. Murad then gave the region to the Bajilan, from near Mosul, who speak a dialect closely related to Gurani.

According to Minorsky, the Bajilan must have originally been a branch of the Guran who had settled in the Mosul region, and Murad was intending to "control the Guran through his own subjects" by putting the Bajilan in charge of them. The Bajilan founded a new capital for themselves at Zohab on the outskirts of Guran territory. Meanwhile, the Kalhur of Zohab "became absorbed in the Guran mass" - they became known as Guran themselves, and they split into three tribes: Qal'eh-Zanjir, Kerend, and Bevanij. The Bajilan were later removed from power in the early 1800s by Muhammad Ali Mirza, governor of Kermanshah. At this point, the Guran of Qal'eh-Zanjir assumed leadership, with their main residence at Gahvareh.

== Subclans ==
The Guran tribe consist of the following clans:

1. Bivaniji
2. Shwankare
3. Tofanghchi
4. Kerendi
5. Yasemi
6. Ghalkhani
7. Ghale Zanjiri

== See also ==
- Nirizhi
