= Revolt of Salar od–Dowleh =

- Part of Post-Constitutional unrest in Qajar Iran
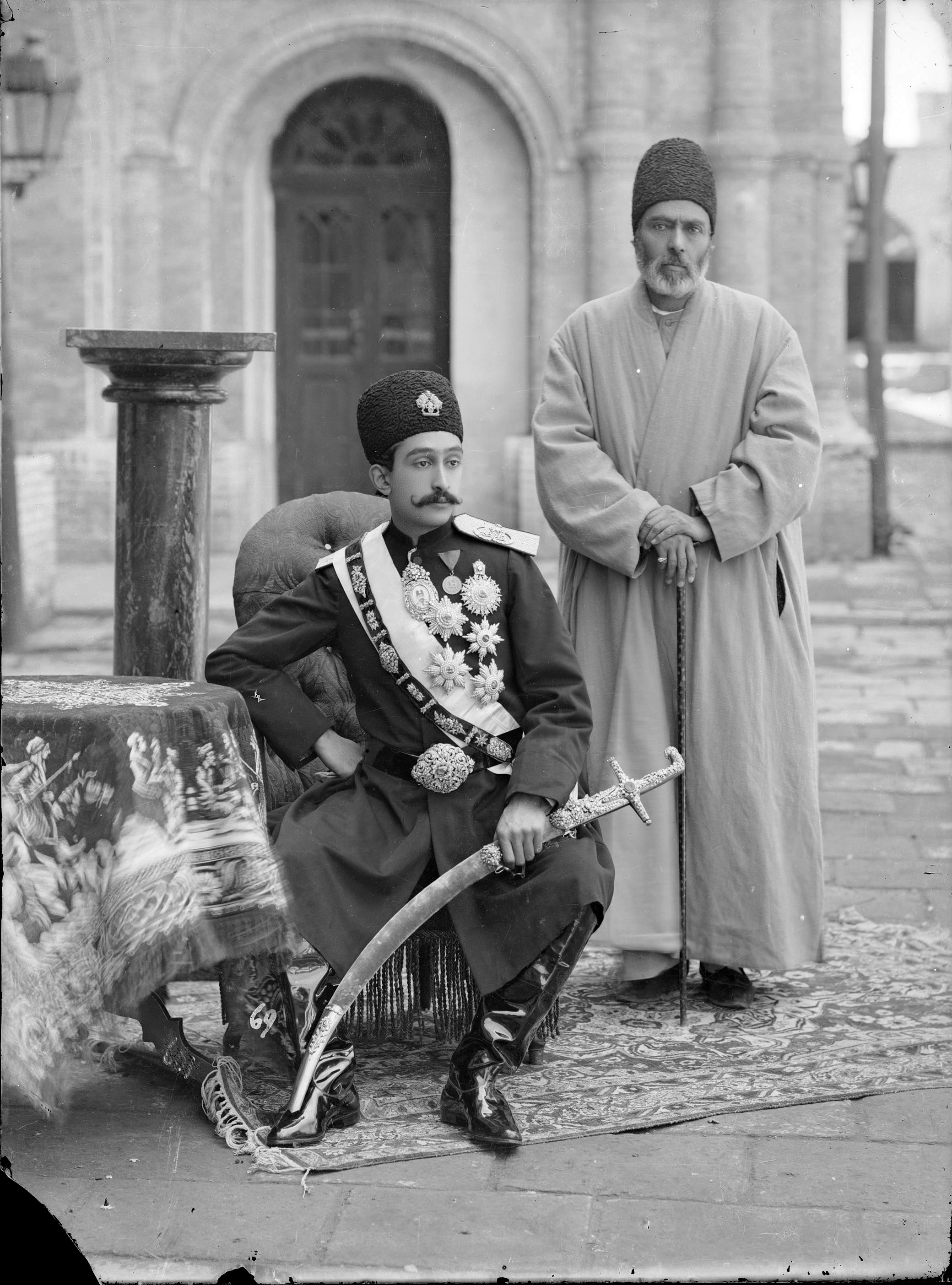
- Salar od–Dowleh (seated)
Date	1911–1913
Location	Western Iran
Result	Revolt suppressed

Belligerents
Forces of Salar od-Dowleh	Qajar Iran

Commanders and leaders
Salar od–Dowleh	Amir Mofakham Bakhtiari; Yeprem Khan

Strength
Tribal forces (exact numbers unknown)	unknown

The Revolt of Salar od–Dowleh was a revolt against the government of the Sublime State of Persia in the 1910s. It began in 1911. It was led by Salar od-Dowleh, a brother of a former shah, Mohammad Ali Shah Qajar.

== Revolt ==
By 17 July, he had occupied Senneh. Salar attempted to advance on Tehran from Kermanshah, but was defeated. After the formation of a new Persian cabinet on 26 July 1911, the Persian government deployed Bakhtiari troops against Salar-al-Daulah in western Persia. The Bakhtiari offensive was marked by widespread looting. The revolt was finally quelled in 1913.
