= Shabaki language =

Indo-Iranian language of Iraq

Shabaki
- شه‌به‌كى زمه‌ابوان
- شەبەکی
- Native to: Iraq
- Region: Mosul
- Ethnicity: Shabaks
- Native speakers: 250,000 (2018)
- Language family: Indo-European: Indo-Iranian; Iranian; Western; Northwestern; Adharic?; Zaza–Gorani?; Gorani; Shabaki–Bajalani; Shabaki

Language codes
- ISO 639-3: sdb
- Glottolog: shab1251

Shabaki is a Northwestern Iranian language belonging to the Iranian branch of the Indo-Iranian subdivision of the Indo-European languages. The Shabaki language is spoken by the Shabak people in the Mosul region of northern Iraq. Although classified as a distinct Northwestern Iranian language, the language has been influenced by the Arabic, Kurdish, Persian and Turkish languages.

== Status ==
Shabaki is an endangered language. The Shabak people fear the demise of the Shabaki language especially after the occupation of the ISIS terrorist groups to their home in Nineveh Plain, which led to the displacement of the majority of their population and the other groups residing in that area.

== Speakers ==
Despite widespread displacement, the Shabaki speakers remain concentrated in localized clusters, specifically within the villages of Ali Rach, Khazna, Talara, and Yangijain in the Nineveh Governorate. The number of speakers of Shabaki was estimated in 1989 to be between 10,000 and 20,000. Subsequently, the number of native speakers of the language is estimated to be approximately 250,000.

== Classification ==
Glottolog classifies the Shabak language as a Northwestern Iranian language belonging to the Shabaki-Bajelani subgroup of the Gorani group. The language consists of two dialects; Chabak and Sarli. On the other hand, some sources classifies it as a subdialect of the Gorani language alongside with Hewrami, Sarli, and Bajalani. The language exhibits significant grammatical affinities with other languages and dialects of the Gorani group such as Bajelani, Sarli, Hewrami, Kakai.

== Comparison ==
=== Pronouns ===
Shabaki	Hewrami	Southern Kurdish	Sorani Kurdish	Kurmanji Kurdish	Zaza	Persian	English
emin, em	emin, min	mi, min	min	ez, min	ez, min	mən	I, me, mine, my
etu	eto, to	tu, tû	to	tu, te	ti, to	to, tu	thou, thee, thine
ew, îna	ew	ew, ewe	ew	ew, wî, wê	a, o	û	s/he, his, hers, him, her
hima, alama, gişt	ma	îme	ême	em, me	ma	ma	we, our
işma	şima	îwe	êwe	hûn, we	şima	şuma	you, your
işan	ade	ewan, ewane	ewan	ewan, wan	înu, înan	anha	they, them, their

=== Vocabulary ===
Shabaki	Hewrami	Southern Kurdish	Sorani Kurdish	Kurmanji Kurdish	Zaza	Persian	English
çam	cem	çem, çew	çaw	çav	çim	çəşm, çişm	eye
ziwan	ziwan	ziwan	ziman	ziman	ziwan	zəban	tongue, language

== Literature ==
- Dr. Sultan, Abbas Hassan Jassim (University of Kufa, Iraq)
  - Shabaki - English Dictionary or here as PDF (2016)
  - An Account of Light verb constructions in Shabaki (Vol. 5 2011, 2)
  - An Account of Clitics in Shabaki with Reference to Wackernagel's Law (2014)
  - Serial verb constructions in Shabaki
  - Reciprocal Pronouns in Shabaki (Vol. 4 2010, 1)
  - Causatives in Shabaki (Vol. 4 2010, 2)
  - An Account of Epistemic Modality in Shabaki
  - The truth conditional content of evidentials in Shabaki
  - Evidentials in Shabaki
  - Shabaki alphabets or here as Slideshow
- E. K. Brown, R. E. Asher, J. M. Y. Simpson (Elsevier, 2006)
  - Encyclopedia of language & linguistics, Band 2
