= Bajalan (tribe) =

Kurdish tribe in Iran and Iraq

The Bajalan (Kurdish: باجەڵان, Bacilan), also known as Bajwan, Bajoran, or Bajolvand, are a Kurdish tribe living mainly in Iran and Iraq. They are mostly Sunni Muslims and speak the Bajalani dialect of Gorani.

== History ==
The Bajalan tribe identified as Kurds, although some researchers and historians had different views on their origin. Minorsky referred to the Bajalan as a mixed Kurdish-Arab tribe loyal to Gazi Hüsrev Pasha. He added that some Bajalan from Mosul migrated to northern Lorestan and began speaking Laki. D.N. MacKenzie claimed that the Bajalan were only considered Kurds in the historically broader sense, and suggested that because the Bajalan in both Zohab and Mosul spoke Gurani, it also indicated their origin, but added that the Bajalan in Lorestan were assimilated by the Laki Kurds. The "Bajulvand" were described as "probably only a Lur equivalent of Bajilan."

The name of the Bajalan tribe was often claimed to derive from "baj", a distortion of "baz", meaning "falcon", and "ilan", meaning "home". Other claims suggested that it came from "baj", which was a type of ritual recitation in Zoroastrian tradition, and "ilan", meaning "place", with Bajalan meaning "place of recitation." Others suggested that the name of Bajalan referred to their settlement and homeland. It was also likely that Bajalan came from Bajawan, roughly meaning "tax collector" in Kurdish. Claudius James Rich encountered the Bajalan who he referred to as a Kurdish tribe. Pierre Oberling described the Bajalan as a Kurdish tribe living mainly around Qasr-e Shirin and around Mosul. According to Rawlinson, the Bajalan had moved to the region around Sarpol-e Zahab from their original homeland near Mosul in the eighteenth century. Some Bajalan historically migrated to further regions such as Qazvin.

During the Ottoman–Safavid War (1623–1639), the Bajalan tribe sided with the Ottomans, and after the war, many Bajalan tribe leaders were captured and many were executed by the Vali dynasty. During first decades of rule of Suleyman I, the Bajalan territories were administered by a mirliva under the province of Luristan. In one Ottoman "muhimme defteri" which documented imperial orders from 1558–60, there were mentions of land belonging to the leader of the "Bajvanlu" tribe, which was designated as a sanjaq under the province of Baghdad. After the peace treaty of 1639, Murad IV gave the title of pasha to Abdal Bey, the leader of the Bajalan, in recognition of his services in the recapture of Baghdad from the Safavids. This was historically the most powerful the Bajalan had been, and they provided 40,000 men to the Ottoman army to suppress a revolt in Baghdad in the mid-1600s. Sultan Murad IV expelled the Kalhor tribe from Zohab and gave their land to the Bajalan tribe from Mosul.

One of the most prominent historical leaders of the Bajalan tribe was Abdullah Khan, who served as the pasha of Zohab for the Ottoman government during the mid-1700s. Also in the mid-1700s, Abdullah Khan demanded tribute from the Lurs, who were Iranian subjects. The Bajalan territories were invaded at least twice at this time by neighboring Kurdish tribes and Iranian dynasties, in 1717 and 1775. In the spring of 1754, Abdullah Khan fought against Mohammad Khan Zand when he occupied the Kermanshah region. In early 1775, Nazar Ali Khan Zand, who had been dispatched by Karim Khan Zand to reestablish Zand hegemony over Kurdistan, defeated Abdullah Khan near the city of Khanaqin, slaughtering 2,000 of his men and seizing 120,000 head of livestock. The Bajalan tribe participated in the civil wars after the death of Karim Khan Zand in 1779, but played only a marginally important role. After the death of Karim Khan Zand, a contingent of the Bajalan supported the son of his half-brother in his attempt to seize power from the Qajar dynasty, although it failed. In the first half of the 19th century, Osman and Fattah were consecutively appointed as the pasha of the Bajalan. The Bajalan lands in Zohab became a permanent part of Iranian territory when Mohammad Ali Mirza Dowlatshah, the governor of Kermanshah, occupied the Zohab region in 1807-08. The last significant leader of the Bajalan tribe was Aziz Khan Shoja-ol-Mamalek, who reached the peak of his influence during the last two decades of the nineteenth century. Around 1882, he was summoned to Isfahan by Zell-os-Soltan and was entrusted with guarding the marches in the vicinity of Qasr-e Shirin. Upon his return to western Iran, he built a fort at Quratu on the Zohab river and established several villages for his sons and other relatives. Toward the end of his rule, a feud erupted between his family and the family of his brother, Khalifa A'azam Khan, who was killed in November 1903, after which the tribe rapidly disintegrated.

Bajalan territory remained mostly under Ottoman control until the twentieth century, although it would sometimes change status and briefly fall to several Iranian dynasties. This had forced the Bajalan leaders to maintain cordial relations with Iranian authorities despite being historically Ottoman subjects. Bajalan territories continued to switch between the Ottomans and Iranians until a new boundary was established in the treaty of Erzurum in 1847. In 1913-1914, when Zohab was given to Iran and Khanaqin to the Ottomans, the Bajalan territories became divided. Leadership of the tribe remained inside Iran for the following period.

The section of the Bajalan which remained in Khanaqin on the Ottoman side during the first two decades of the 1900s was led by Mustafa Pasha. In 1912, he was detained by the Ottoman governor in Baghdad on suspicion of having pro-British leanings. In 1917, Khanaqin was militarily occupied by the Russians in the spring, the Ottomans in the summer and the autumn, and the British in the winter. The British already had a relationship with the Bajalan tribe and they strengthened it after they established themselves in Khanaqin.

In 1918, a division of the Bajalan tribe joined a Kurdish tribal contingent in the British forces fighting against the Ottoman army. The Bajalan, along with the Suramiri and Dilo tribes, made up a contingent of 200 tribesmen in total which fought the Ottomans along the upper Diyala River in April 1918. Other Bajalan, hostile to the British, destroyed much of the Anglo-Persian Oil Company’s machinery near Khanaqin. The Bajalan tribe did not accept the sovereignty of Shaykh Mahmud Barzinji in 1919. The Bajalan tribe, headed by Naqshbandi sheikhs, the Talabani tribe, headed by Qadiri sheikhs, and most of the Jaf tribe, did not accept the sovereignty of Mahmud Barzinji.

The Bajalan in the northeast of Mosul were also known as Bajwan, and many of them were mixed with the Shabak there. Some earlier scholars even used Shabak and Bajalan synonymously, although later scholars suggested they were distinct, as the Bajalan tribally organized Sunnis, while the Shabaks were non-tribal heterodox Shias, and although they both spoke Gorani, they had differences in dialect. Both the Bajalan and the Shabak were sometimes considered Kaka'i in Iraq.

The Bajalan tribe around Zohab and Qasr-e-Shirin spoke a Gorani dialect called Bajalani. The Bajalan around Mosul spoke an offshoot of the dialect. The Bajalan in Zohab, which spoke Gorani, lived near the Jaf which spoke Sorani and the rest of the tribes of Kermanshah which spoke Southern Kurdish. By the 21st century, most Bajalan lived in the northeast of Mosul, with some living in Zohab and northern Luristan.

The Bajalan tribe was mostly Sunni Muslim. The Bajalan in Mosul had a higher veneration for Ali out of respect for the Shabaks. The Bajalan were of Yarsani origin before becoming Sunni Muslims.

Pierre Oberling wrote that the Bajalan population was between 600 and 2,000 families and that the Bajalan tribe was made up of the clans of Jomur, Qazanlu, Shiravand, Hajilar Gharibavand, and Dandavand. The Encyclopedia of Islam mentioned that the Bajalan tribe was made up of two main branches the Jomur near Zohab, and the Qazanlu near Bin Kudra, with the other branches being the Shiravand, Hajilar, Gharibavand, Falavan, Khudravand, Zuzavand, Qasravand, Jaraklav, Mamavand, Dawudvand, Dalvand, Saruja, Juburli, Hivanli, Qaravand, Chukarlu, and Sikavand.
