= Gorani language =

Group of Northwestern Iranic dialects

Gorani
- گۆرانی; Goranî
- Native to: Iraq and Iran
- Region: Kurdistan (Primarily Hawraman, also Garmian and Nineveh), Kermanshah province
- Native speakers: 300,000 (2008)
- Language family: Indo-European: Indo-Iranian; Iranian; Western; Northwestern; Adharic?; Zaza–Gorani?; Gorani
- Dialects: Hawraman-I Luhon; Hawraman-I Taxt; Kakai; Gawhara; Kandula; Zardayana; Shabaki; Ṣārlī; Bāǰalāni (Bēǰwān); Gawrajuyi
- Writing system: Kurdish alphabet

Language codes
- ISO 639-3: Variously: hac – Gorani (Gurani) sdb – Shabaki sdf – Sarli bjm – Bajelani
- Glottolog: gura1251
- ELP: Gurani; Bajelani
Linguasphere
58-AAA-b
- Gorani (Hawrami) is classified as Definitely Endangered by the UNESCO; Atlas of the World's Languages in Danger

Gorani or Gurani (Kurdish: گۆرانی, romanized: Goranî, lit. 'song'), also known by the name of its main dialect, Hawrami (ھەورامی, romanized: Hewramî), is a Northwestern Iranian language or a group of similar Northwestern Iranian dialects spoken in small pockets in northeastern Iraq and northwestern Iran.

Gorani is spoken in Iraq and Iran and has four dialects: Bajelani, Hawrami, and Sarli, some sources also include the Shabaki as a dialect of Gorani as well. Of these, Hawrami was the traditional literary language and koiné of Kurds in the historical Ardalan region at the Zagros Mountains, but has since been supplanted by Central Kurdish and Southern Kurdish. Gorani is a literary language for many Kurds.

== History ==
The linguistic homeland of the Gurani dialects is believed to be somewhere around the Caspian Sea. It is suggested that Gurani speakers migrated en bloc from the Caspian region to their present-day settlements at an unknown early date.

== Classification ==
Gurani is a member of the Indo-European language family, belonging to the Northwestern Iranian branch of Iranian languages. Ethnologue classifies it within a genetic subgroup called Zaza-Gorani, along with Zaza, within the Northwestern Iranian languages.However, despite some similarities, significant linguistic differences were found between the two languages.The Glottolog database proposes a detailed classification and classifies it within the Adharic subgroup. Different treatment of Gorani from other Kurdish languages in linguistic works is based on the idea of Mackenzie in 1961. However, broader classifications of Kurdish languages include Gorani in the Kurdish language family. Although early research was affected by colonial interests and oversimplification of the situation due to lack of access to the community, there were few decolonizing efforts. Investigating the morphological features of Hawrami/Gorani with other Kurdish dialects shows that despite some differences, there are many similarities between them and, on a broader level, the similarities outweigh the differences. Western linguists, however, appear to have focused primarily on the differences. Hawrami linguist Mihemed Emîn Hewramanî argued that Hawrami is a dialect within the unified tree of the Kurdish language, rather than an isolated external branch Recentrly, despite the early sources, several peer-reviewed academic papers referred to Gorani and its dialects as a member of Kurdish languages. The Dialect Atlas database classifies Hawrami as a member of the Kurdish language family. Recent computational linguistics studies using machine learning, natural language processing, and deep learning classify Hawrami as a dialect of Kurdish. Study of quantitative lexical similarity between Hawrami and other Kurdish dialects showed that lexical similarity between Hawrami and Kurmanji Kurdish is quite similar to Kurmanji and Sorani Kurdish.

== Dialects ==
Gorani comprises a group of similar Northwestern Iranian dialects and consists of Kandula, Bāǰalānī, Šabaki, Ṣārlī and Hawrāmāni (Avromān).

Gorani dialects consist of Hawramani, Kakai, Zardayana, Bajalani and Shabaki.

Gorani dialects lack gender and case, except for Hawrāmi.

=== Bajelani ===
Bajelani is a Gorani dialect with about 59,000 speakers, predominately around Mosul, near Khanaqin and near the Khosar valley.

=== Hewrami ===
Hewrami (Gurani: هەورامی, romanized: Hewramî) also known as Avromani, Awromani , Hawrami, or Horami, is a Gorani dialect and is regarded as the most archaic one. It is mostly spoken in the Hawraman region, a mountainous region located in western Iran (Iranian Kurdistan) and northeastern Iraq (Iraqi Kurdistan). There are around 23,000 speakers, and it was classed as "definitely endangered" by UNESCO in 2010.

Due to concerns with the decline of Hawrami speakers, as people move away from the Hawraman region to cities such as Erbil, Jamal Habibullah Faraj Bedar, a retired teacher from Tawela, decided to translate the Qur'an from Arabic into Hawrami. The translation took two and a half months, and 1000 copies of the publication were printed in Tehran.

=== Sarli ===
Sarli is spoken in northern Iraq by a cluster of villages north of the Little Zab river, on the confluence of the Khazir River and the Great Zab river, just west-northwest of the city of Kirkuk. It has fewer than 20,000 speakers. Many speakers have been displaced by conflicts in the region. It is reportedly most similar to Bajelani but is also similar to Shabaki. It contains Kurdish, Turkish and Persian influences, similar to its neighbours Bajelani and Shabaki.

== Phonology ==
=== Consonants ===
		Labial	Dental	Alveolar	Post- alveolar	Velar	Uvular	Pharyngeal	Glottal
Nasal		m		n					
Plosive	aspirated	pʰ		tʰ	t͡ʃʰ	kʰ	q		[ʔ]
Plosive	voiced	b		d	d͡ʒ	ɡ			
Fricative	voiceless	f		s	ʃ	x		ħ	h
Fricative	voiced	(v)	ð	z	ʒ		(ʁ)	(ʕ)	
Lateral	plain			l					
Lateral	velarized			ɫ					
Rhotic	tap			ɾ					
Rhotic	trill			r					
Approximant		w			j				

All voiceless plosives and affricates are aspirated.

- A glottal stop [ʔ] may be heard before a word-initial vowel, but is not phonemic.
- Sounds /ʕ ʁ/ only occur in loanwords.
- /x/ can also be heard as [χ] among different dialects.
- /q/ can also be aspirated as [qʰ].
- The voiced /d/ may be lenited in post-vocal positions, and occur as a voiced dental approximant [ð̞]. In the Nawsud dialects, /d/ can be heard as an alveolar approximant sound [ɹ], and may also be devoiced when occurring in word-final positions as [ɹ̥].
- In the Nawsud and Nodša dialects, a word-initial /w/ can be heard as a [v] or a labialized [vʷ].
- /n/ when preceding velar consonants, is heard as a velar nasal [ŋ].

=== Vowels ===
	Front	Central	Back
Close	i		u
Near-close	ɪ		ʊ
Close-mid	e		o
Mid		ə	
Open-mid	ɛ		ɔ
Near-open	æ		
Open		a	

- Sounds /æ ə/ both can be realized as an open-mid [ɛ].

== Speakers ==
Gorani had an estimated 180,000 speakers in Iran in 2007 and 120,000 speakers in Iraq as well in 2007 for a total of 300,000 speakers. Ethnologue and the Documentation of Endangered Languages reports that the language is threatened in both Iran and Iraq, and that speakers residing in Iraq includes all adults and some children; however, it does not mention if speakers are shifting to Sorani or not. Many speakers of Gorani in Iran also speak Sorani, Persian, as well as Southern Kurdish. Most speakers in Iraq also speak Sorani, while some also speak Mesopotamian Arabic. Furthermore, in the 2010 edition of UNESCO's Atlas of the World's Languages in Danger Gorani (Hawrami) was classified as an endangered north-western Iranic language. Although some classify Gorani as linguistically distinct from the Kurdish language, the great majority of its speakers consider their language to be Kurdish (Note: The speakers of Gorani considered their language as Kurdish.) while some oppose it and emphasize their own identity distinct from the Kurds. Genetically, the Mitochondrial DNA of Hawrami speakers shows a high similarity with the ancestors of the Kurdish people, who were living in the Bronze Age. Also, a single nucleotide polymorphism study of Interferon-induced transmembrane protein 3 and interleukin-6 on Hawrami and Sorani speakers showed high genetic similarity between these two groups. A genetic study on Kurds living in Iran showed no significant differences between Hawrami speakers and other Kurds in the country.

== Literature ==
Under the independent rulers of Ardalan (9th–14th / 14th–19th century), with their capital latterly at Sanandaj, Gorani became the vehicle of a considerable corpus of poetry. Gorani was and remains the first language of the scriptures of the Ahl-e Haqq sect, or Yarsanism, centered on Gahvara. Prose works, in contrast, are hardly known. The structure of Gorani verse is very simple and monotonous. It consists almost entirely of stanzas of two rhyming half-verses of ten syllables each, with no regard to the quantity of syllables.

The names of forty classical poets writing in Gorani are known, but the details and dates of their lives are unknown for the most part. Perhaps the earliest writer is Mele Perîşan, author of a masnavi of 500 lines on the Shi'ite faith who is reported to have lived around 1356–1431. Other poets are known from the 17th–19th centuries and include Shaykh Mustafa Takhtayi, Khana Qubadi, Yusuf Yaska, Mistefa Bêsaranî and Khulam Rada Khan Arkawazi. One of the last great poets to complete a book of poems (divan) in Gurani is Mawlawi Tawagozi south of Halabja.

The Kurdish Shahnameh is a collection of epic poems that has been passed down orally from one generation to the next. Eventually, some of these stories were written down by Almas Khan-e Kanoule'ei in the 18th century. There exist also a dozen or more long epic or romantic masnavis, mostly translated by anonymous writers from Persian literature including: Bijan and Manijeh, Khurshid-i Khawar, Khosrow and Shirin, Layla and Majnun, Shirin and Farhad, Haft Khwan-i Rostam and Sultan Jumjuma. Manuscripts of these works are currently preserved in the national libraries of Berlin, London, and Paris.

=== Example of Gorani poetry ===
An excerpt from Şîrîn û Xesrew (Shirin and Khosrow), written in 1740 by Khana Qubadî:

Herçen mewaçan: Fersî şekeren
Kurdî ce şeker bell şîrînteren
Yeqînen ce dewr dunyay pirr endêş
Herkes dillşaden we ziwan wêş

Translation:

Although it's said that Persian is sweet as sugar,
But, for me Kurdish is sweeter than sugar
Clearly, in this perfidious world,
Everyone is happy with his own beautiful mother tongue.

== Gallery ==
Partial tree of Indo-European languages.

== Textbooks ==
- D. N. MacKenzie (1966). The Dialect of Awroman (Hawraman-i Luhon). Kobenhavn. drive.google.com
