= Manrud =

Historical region in Iran

Manrud (Persian: مانرود) or Kul-i Manrud (Persian: کول مانرود) is a historical region in southwestern Iran, frequently mentioned during the early Islamic period. It had a strong association with the Lurs.

== History ==
The region of Manrud was called "Kūl-i Manrud", with "kūl" meaning "little ravine" in Luri. According to Tarikh-e Guzida, the wilayat of Manrud included a village named Kurd, near which there was a defile named Lur, which was given as one of the possible origins of the name of the Lurs. The tradition was probably based on the memory of the town al-Lur mentioned by early Arab geographers, with its name surviving in Sahra-ye Lur north of Dezful. Tarikh-e Guzida concluded by listing the two principal tribes of Manrud, the Jangruyi and Aztari, as well as their eight clans, and the eighteen other Lur tribes. The Khorshidi dynasty established itself in the region after Shoja al-Din Khorshid captured Diz-i Siyah in the wilayat of Samha, and eventually all of Manrud, from Sorkhab Ayyar.

Some suggested that Manrud corresponded with the later Madiyanrud in Tarhan. According to Minorsky, the name of Manrud much resembled that of Madiyanrud, although historical considerations would have placed it near Mangarra, which he located north of Qilab. He added that Manrud, reportedly the ancestral home of the Lurs, corresponded with Mangarra and was unlikely to be near Khorramabad. Manrud also included Samha, with its fortress of Diz-i Siyah corresponding to the fort of Diz which defended Mangarra and was destroyed by the Vali of Posht-e Kuh in 1895. Later, Mangarra became a dehestan of Alvar-e Garmsiri. It was also part of the Bala Gariva region.
