= Gholamreza Khan =

Last governor of the Vali dynasty (1900–1928)

Gholamreza Khan was a Feyli Lur governor of Posht-e-Kuh and the last ruler of the Vali dynasty. He succeeded his father, Hoseynqoli Khan, at the beginning of the 20th century, and ruled until around 1928 when Reza Shah established direct rule over all of Iran, after which Posht-e-Kuh mostly became part of Ilam province. Gholamreza Khan fled to Iraq where he died in 1939.

== Biography ==
During his youth around 1864–1865, Gholamreza Khan, on the orders of his father and the Iranian government, went to Bala Gariva and defeated the rebellious Dirakvand tribe and conquered their lands, and was given the title of Fath-ol-Soltan by Nasser al-Din Shah Qajar. Around 1900–1901, Gholamreza Khan became the Vali of Posht-e-Kuh after the death of his father Hoseynqoli Khan Abu Qaddara. At the same time, he was given the title of Sarim al-Saltana, and a short time later he was given the title of Sardar Ashrafi, and his son Amanullah Khan was given the title of Sarim al-Saltana. His rule was very similar to that of his father, and Posht-e-Kuh was relatively calm and stable during World War I when Iran was in chaos. He was considerably less violent than his father. He was still very powerful and only tacitly acknowledged his vassal status to the Qajars with annual tribute. By 1900, he was a major general in the Persian army and commanded 30,000 men.

Around 1903–1904, Gholamreza Khan was overthrown by his son Amanollah Khan and went into exile, but they soon reconciled and he returned. Gholamreza Khan had married off one of his daughters to Abolfath Mirza Salar-od-Dowlah. Around 1908–1909, Gholamreza Khan was assigned to suppress the rebellious Sagvand tribe which had plundered the city of Dezful, in which he himself led a force of two thousand men. He was also involved in many clashes with the Ottomans on the border. In February 1910, Gholamreza Khan joined an alliance with Sheikh Khazal and Sowlat-od-Dowlah against the Bakhtiaris.

In 1916, Muhammad Amin Zaki Beg went on an official trip to Posht-e-Kuh and met with Gholamreza Khan. He wrote that Gholamreza Khan ruled over a large Kurdish population and that they had spoken Kurdish during their meeting. Gholamreza Khan had 14 sons and 12 daughters. He was an avid hunter and owned a large kennel of Saluki dogs. He had sent some Salukis to English breeders in 1923, some of the first to enter Europe.

When Ahmad Shah Qajar was deposed and Reza Shah cane to power, Gholamreza Khan felt as if the end of his rule was inevitable. Gholamreza Khan rejected invitations to Tehran, instead packing his valuables and fleeing to Baghdad with his family in 1928–1929. He continued to reject invitations back to Iran. Mehdiqoli Hedayat claimed that he signed a decree on September 8, 1929, and granted amnesty to Gholamreza Khan after his son Yadollah Khan had requested it. Gholamreza Khan died in Baghdad in 1939.
