= Papi (tribe) =

Lur tribe in Iran

The Papi (Persian: پاپی) are a Lur tribe living mainly in southwestern Iran. The Papi tribe is one of the tribes of Bala Gariva and speak a Luri dialect. The tribe are mostly Shia Muslims.

== History ==
Some suggested that the name of the Papi tribe derived from Papa-Dinar, reportedly the ancestor of the tribe, who lived in the 13th century and was buried in the Hashtad-Pahlav Mountain in the traditional Papi territory. Others claimed it came from Papi-Morad, reportedly the name of a disciple of Shahzadeh Ahmad, son of Musa Kazem, who came with him to Lorestan. Some sources mentioned the Papi tribe synonymously as servants of Shahzadeh Ahmad. Others claimed the name Papi was linked to the Luri term for "grandfather". Others also derived "Papi" from "papey", meaning "follower", in reference to Shahzada Ahmad. Nevertheless, their naming remained unclear. Some claimed that historically the usage of the term "Lur" among the Papi "connoted only the average tribesmen, not the elite."

The Papi were one of the Lur tribes of Bala Gariva, and spoke Luri. The traditional territory of the Papi tribe in Lorestan was historically known as the Papi region. The Papi tribe traditionally neighbored the Dirakvand, Qalavand, Sagvand, Saki, Reshno, and Bakhtiari tribes. Carl Feilberg conducted extensive research on the Papi tribe in 1935, and listed their important regions as Gerit, Kasharaf, Sepiddasht, Gazeh, Mazo, Taf, Keshvar, and Sirom. Vladimir Minorsky wrote that the encampments of the Papi tribe, south of Khorramabad, included Gerit. According to Minorsky, the Lur tribe of Papi, alongside the Sagvand and Badra'i tribes, were followers of the secretive Ahl-i Haqq religion, and added that the Papi tribe were the custodians of the tomb of Shahzadeh Ahmad, the son of Musa Kazem, and that the Papi elders wore red turbans, which he linked to Khurramite traditions. However, Edmonds wrote that he never heard of any religion among the tribes of Bala Gariva besides orthodox Shia Islam, and suggested that "papi" with the red turbans at the shrine had no connection with the Papi tribe. Similarly, Feilberg wrote that the tribe did not include any Ahl-i Haqq adherents, "who find them very bad mannered." Nevertheless, the Papi tribe, like the other Lurs, historically held a veneration for Shahzadeh Ahmad.

The Papi occupied Darreh Nasab, the traditional summer territory of the Baharvand, after Karim Khan Zand took some tribes, including the Baharvand, with him to Shiraz. After his death, the Baharvand returned to Darreh Nasab, and the Papi were forced to leave after heavy fighting. The Baharvand then attacked the Papi in the Taf valley and occupied that territory as well. Around that time, Haydar Khan, from the Papi tribe, was forced to flee Lorestan and became a shepherd for the Duraki tribe of the Bakhtiari. When it was discovered that he was a khan, he became leader of the Duraki tribe. The Papi were brutally suppressed during the campaigns of Reza Shah in Lorestan. The Iranian nomadic census at the start of the 21st century numbered the Papi tribe at almost 6,000 individuals.
