= Shoja al-Din Khorshid =

Founder and first ruler of the Khorshidi dynasty

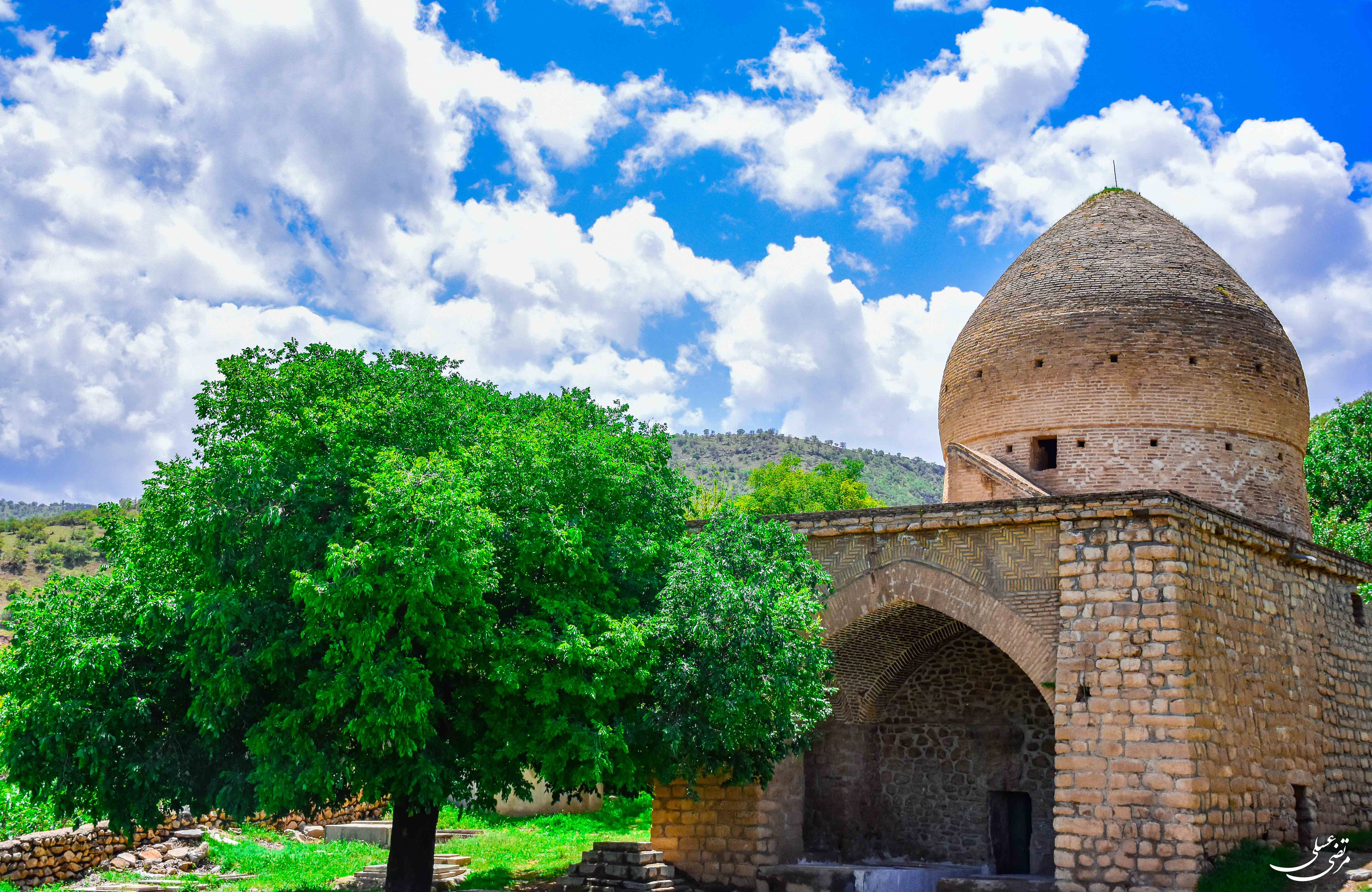
- Tomb of Shoja al-Din Khorshid in the Shahanshah cemetery in Khorramabad

Atabek
- Preceded by: Position established
- Succeeded by: Sayf al-Din Rostam

Personal details
- Born: Around 1124
- Died: 1224
- Occupation: Governor

Shoja al-Din Khorshid (Persian: شجاع‌الدین خورشید) was a Lur governor who was the founder and first ruler of the Khorshidi dynasty. His rule began around 1174-75/1184-85 and lasted until his death around 1224. His son, Badr, was killed by his nephew Sayf al-Din Rostam who assumed power.

== Biography ==
Shoja al-Din Khorshid bin Abu Bakr bin Muhammad bin Khorshid was born to a Lur family of the Solvizi clan of the Jangru'i tribe, and his ancestors had entered the service of Hisamuddin Shuhli, a Turkic governor who ruled Lorestan and Khuzistan towards the end of the Seljuk period.

Shoja al-Din Khorshid was first appointed as a Shihna over parts of Lorestan on behalf of Hisamuddin Shuhli, although when he died around 1174–75 or 1184–85, Shoja al-Din Khorshid became independent and established control over all of Lur-e-Kuchak. He fought against his own tribe, the Jangru'i, which were then subjects of his rival Sorkhab Ayyar, and besieged their stronghold of Diz-i Siyah. Around 1184–85, he deposed Sorkhab Ayyar, who was an Annazid scion. The inhabitants handed all of Manrud to Shoja al-Din, although the caliph requested the stronghold of Mangarra, compensating Shoja al-Din with the district of Tarazak in Khuzistan. Shoja al-Din also drove back the Bayat Turks ravaging Lorestan. The conflict between Sorkhab Ayyar and Shoja al-Din Khorshid was long and intense, said to have started over a rabbit while they were hunting. Hisamuddin Shuhli had mostly contained the conflict, although it reignited after his death, and Sorkhab Ayyar reluctantly accepted becoming governor of Manrud after being defeated by Shoja al-Din. Shoja al-Din formed the Khorshidi government from the local Lur and Kurdish tribes in the region of Lur-e-Kuchak.

Shoja al-Din lived a nomadic life, spending summers in Bala Gariva and winters elsewhere. He died at the age of 100 around 1224 and his tomb was venerated by Lurs. His son, Badr, was killed by his nephew Sayf al-Din Rostam bin Nur al-Din who became the atabek. The dynasty started by Shoja al-Din Khorshid became known as the Khorshidis, taking their name from him, although there was a smaller possibility that it was from Muhammad Khorshid, a local leader who ruled parts of Lorestan before Shoja al-Din.
