= Bala Gariva =

Geo-cultural region in southwestern Iran

Bala Gariva (Luri and Persian: بالاگریوه) is a region in southwestern Iran, located mainly between Khorramabad and Andimeshk. Bala Gariva, a region defined by both geography and ethnicity, strongly associated with the Lurs, was also considered an important Lur subdivision which spoke the Bala Gariva'i dialect of northern Luri.

== Geographical extent ==
The region of Bala Gariva traditionally extended from Khorramabad in the north to Andimeshk in the south, and from the Diz River in the east to the Kashgan and Saymara (Karkheh) rivers in the west. Bala Gariva was located to the south of Khorramabad, and included the southern tail of the Garrin Mountain range, and extended southwards where it was enclosed on three sides by the Kashgan, Karkheh, and Diz rivers. The region of Bala Gariva was also defined by ethnicity.

Bala Gariva was naturally an extremely isolated region, and its fragmented landscape required pastoral nomads to cross over the ridges instead of go around them as they migrate. In 1973, there were no permanent settlements outside of Khorramabad and a few agricultural valleys, and there were no nomads either. Bala Gariva is also one of the main basins and is a fertile region. Settlements within Bala Gariva included Veysian and Malavi.

== History ==
Bala Gariva was said to mean "high cliffs". The traditional homeland of the Lurs was divided into Lur-e-Bozorg and Lur-e-Kuchak in the 10th century. Bala Gariva was the easternmost territory of Lur-e-Kuchak. Lur-e-Kuchak would later simply be called Luristan. Bala Gariva was often seen as the third division of Luristan in addition to Pish-e-Kuh and Posht-e-Kuh, which were divided by the Kabir Kuh, and later corresponded with the Iranian provinces of Lorestan and Ilam respectively. Other times, Bala Gariva was considered a part of Pish-e-Kuh, in which the Bala Gariva tribes along with the Tarhan tribes comprised the majority of Pish-e-Kuh. Bala Gariva was far more sparse than other parts of Luristan.

Shuja al-Din Khorshid, the founder of the Khorshidi dynasty, spent his summers in Bala Gariva. By the end of the Qajar dynasty, the Iranian state had no authority in Bala Gariva, which was practically independent with each tribe ruling itself. Reza Shah later established direct authority in Bala Gariva along with the rest of Luristan and Iran.

== Population ==
The population of Bala Gariva consists of Lurs from various tribes including Baharvand, Qalavand, Judaki, Mir, Papi, and Saki. Other tribes included Sagvand, Dirakvand, and Beyranvand. While sometimes incorrectly described as a "confederacy", the tribes of Bala Gariva were a geographic rather than political division. They speak a Northern Luri dialect known as Bala Gariva'i. They traditionally followed Shia Islam. Unlike other parts of Lorestan where Luri, Kurdish, and Laki were spoken diversely, Luri was the only common language in Bala Gariva. The Lurs of Bala Gariva had also been referred to as the "highland tribes". The Vali dynasty ruled all of Luristan for nearly 200 years, during which all tribes under their rule were known as "Feyli". When the Qajars took control of Pish-e-Kuh, only the tribes of Posht-e-Kuh under the Vali were labelled as Feyli. However, the term "Feyli" was still loosely applied to the tribes in Pish-e-Kuh and Bala Gariva. Ali Mardan Asgari Alam mentioned Bala Gariva as a tribal group from a lineage or confederacy that was smaller than a standard tribe.

Vladimir Minorsky wrote that the main Lur subdivisions were the tribes of Tarhan, Dilfan, Silsila, and Bala Gariva, and considered the first three groups as Lak Kurds, but added that the tribes of Bala Gariva were "the Lurs par excellence and have important subdivisions: Dirīgwand, Sagwand, etc. It is possible that the Dirīgwand are the real nucleus of the Lur race." He further added that the tribes of Bala Gariva were considerably democratic in their affairs, unlike the Kurdish tribes who were more attached to their chiefs. Some tribes of Bala Gariva, such as the Dirakvand and Sagvand, were loosely attached to the Bakhtiari.

Minorsky had also included the Beyranvand and Dalvand tribes, which spoke Laki, as tribes of Bala Gariva. Belelli later added that all tribes of Bala Gariva spoke northern Luri, except the Beyranvand which spoke Laki. While the Beyranvand were sometimes listed as a tribe of Bala Gariva, Iranian scholars clarified that the Beyranvand were of Lak origin from northern Lorestan and had no kinship ties with the Lur tribes of Bala Gariva.

Some tribes from the Hamadan region, including the Torkashvand tribe and some Turkic pastoralist tribes, historically made seasonal migrations to Bala Gariva. Both the Laki-speaking Torkashvand and the Turkic Yarimtoglu resembled the local Lurs in clothing.
