= Safavid Lorestan =

Province in western Safavid Iran

Safavid Lorestan Velāyat-e Lorestān
- 1508–1578; 1587–1736
- Status: Province of Safavid Iran
- Capital: Khorramabad
Preceded by	Succeeded by
Khorshidi dynasty	Afsharid Iran

The province of Lorestan (Persian: ولایت لرستان, romanized: Velāyat-e Lorestān) was a western province of Safavid Iran, corresponding to the present-day provinces of Ilam and Lorestan. It was one of the five velayats (semi-autonomous provinces) of the country, and was thus ruled by a vali ("viceroy", "governor").

== History ==
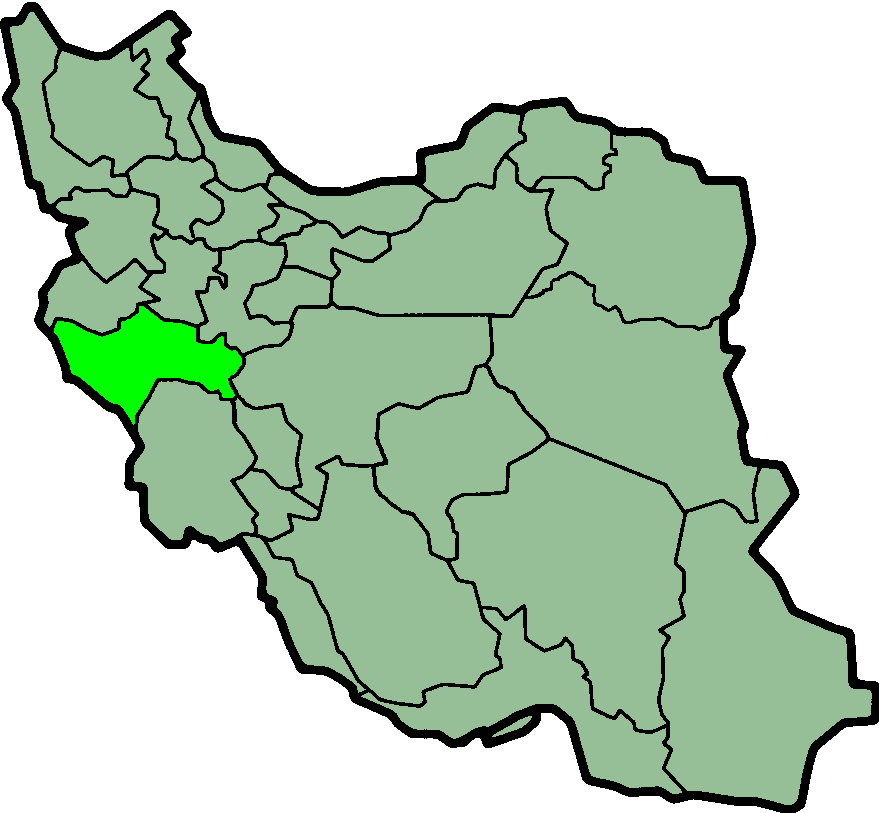
The size of Safavid Lorestan in the borders of present-day Iran

Lorestan was one of the five velayats of the Safavid realm, being ruled by a vali (viceroy), who was nearly an independent governor. The valis generally belonged to prominent local families, and were officially chosen by the shah (king) as a compromise of regional autonomy. Nevertheless, they ruled in a hereditary manner. Under the Safavids, the Lurs were integrated into the Safavid administrative system with some degree of autonomy, while the Lur tribal federations began to consolidate, and Lur tribal chiefs were officially recognized. The Safavid-Lur relations were mutually beneficial, with the Safavids gaining military support, and the Lurs gaining autonomy and protection. However, the Lur tribes resisted later efforts to centralize the Iranian government.

The province was composed of three lower-ranking governorships, Khaveh, Sadmareh and Khorramabad, the latter which was also controlled by the vali of Lorestan. Since the closing of the 12th-century, Little Lorestan had been ruled by the Khorshidi dynasty. The area, also known as Lorestan from the 16th-century and onwards, roughly corresponded to the present-day Ilam and Lorestan provinces. In 1508, Lorestan acknowledged the suzerainty of the Safavid shah Ismail I (r. 1501–1524). After the latter's return from Baghdad, he confirmed the Khorshidi ruler Shah Rostam Abbasi as the governor of Lorestan, which included the districts of Sadmareh, Harunabad and Silakhur. During the 1540s, the Safavids established more direct control in Lorestan, such as in Khorramabad. Because the governor of Lorestan resided in the latter city, he was also known as the "governor of Khorramabad and Lorestan". From 1578 till 1587, the governors of Lorestan were in league with the Ottoman Empire.

Following the suppression of Shahverdi Abbasi's rebellion and his subsequent execution, Shah Abbas I (r. 1588–1629) had all male members of the Khorshidi family either blinded or jailed, thus marking their end. Shahverdi Abbasi's maternal cousin Hoseyn Khan Solvizi was appointed the governor of Lorestan, while Tahmaspqoli Khan Inanlu was appointed the governor of some of its parts close to Baghdad, such as Sadmareh and Hendamin. From 1603 and onwards, the Solvizi family became the hereditary governors of Lorestan. In the 1670s, however, Shah Soleyman (r. 1666–1694) gave the governorship of Lorestan to a non-Lori, who was later forced out by the locals.

The governor of Lorestan, Ali Mardan Khan Feyli, played a significant role during the upheavals caused by the arrival of the Afghans to the Safavid capital of Isfahan. He participated in the defense of Isfahan in 1722/23 with 5,000 of his soldiers. Even though he had been chosen as the commander-in-chief of the Iranian army, the other khans disobeyed his instructions. In 1725, the Ottoman Empire invaded Iran, seizing Khorramabad and thus forcing Ali Mardan Khan Feyli to withdraw to Khuzestan, where he launched attacks against Baghdad. The Ottoman force that crossed the Bakhtiari domain to get to Firuzan were forced to withdraw.

== List of governors ==
This is a list of the known figures who governed Lorestan or parts of it. Hakem and beglerbegi were both administrative titles designating the governor.

Date	Governor	Observations
1508	Shah Rostam Abbasi	Hakem of Khorramabad and Lorestan
?–1540	Mir Ughur ibn Shah Rostam	Hakem of Lorestan
1541–1542	Mir Jahangir	Hakem of Lorestan and Khorramabad
?–1549	Bahram Mirza	Hakem of Lorestan and Mankara (Sadmareh?)
1549–?	Rostam Khan	Hakem of Lorestan and possibly Mankara
1568	Gheyb Soltan Ustajlu	Hakem of Lorestan and Kurdistan
1568–1585	Mohammad Lori	Hakem of half of Lorestan, i.e. Khorramabad and its surroundings
1568–1575–?	Shah Rostam II	Hakem of half of Lorestan, i.e. Khaveh and Lashtar
1578–1587	Ottoman rule	
1589–1593	Soltan Mohammad Shah	Hakem of Lorestan
1593	Shahverdi Abbasi	Hakem of Lorestan
1593–1594	Soltan Hoseyn ibn Shah Rostam	Hakem of Lorestan except Khorramabad
1593–1595	Mehdiqoli Khan Shamlu	Hakem of Khorramabad
1594–1598	Shahverdi Abbasi	Second tenure. Hakem of all Lorestan from 1595 onwards
1598–?	Tahmaspqoli Khan Inanlu	Hakem of Sadmareh, Hendamin, and lands close to Baghdad
1598–1631	Hoseyn Khan Solvizi	Initially hakem of parts of Lorestan, later beglerbegi of the whole province. Also served as the mir of the Bakhtiyaris
1631–1641	Shahverdi Khan	Son of the previous governor. Beglerbegi of Lorestan
1641–1648–?	Aliqoli Khan	Son of the previous governor. Beglerbegi of Lorestan
1651–?	Manuchehr Khan	Uncle of the previous governor. Hakem of Lorestan
1684	Unnamed	Qizilbash governor
1694–1695	Shahverdi Khan	Hakem of Little Lorestan
1722	Ali Mardan Khan Feyli	Hakem of Lorestan

== Sources ==
- Ehlers, Eckart (2021). "Khorramabad". In Yarshater, Ehsan (ed.). Encyclopædia Iranica (Online ed.). Encyclopædia Iranica Foundation.
- Floor, Willem (2008). Titles and Emoluments in Safavid Iran: A Third Manual of Safavid Administration, by Mirza Naqi Nasiri. Washington, D.C.: Mage Publishers. ISBN 978-1933823232.
- Matthee, Rudi (2011). Persia in Crisis: Safavid Decline and the Fall of Isfahan. I.B.Tauris. ISBN 978-0857731814.
- Matthee, Rudi (2015). "Relations between the Center and the Periphery in Safavid Iran: The Western Borderlands v. the Eastern Frontier Zone". The Historian. 77 (3): 431–463. doi:10.1111/hisn.12068. S2CID 143393018.
- Minorsky, V. (1986). "Luristān". In Bosworth, C. E.; van Donzel, E.; Lewis, B. & Pellat, Ch. (eds.). The Encyclopaedia of Islam, Second Edition. Volume V: Khe–Mahi. Leiden: E. J. Brill. pp. 829–832. ISBN 978-90-04-07819-2.
- Spuler, B. (1987). "Atābakān-e Lorestān". In Yarshater, Ehsan (ed.). Encyclopædia Iranica. Vol. II/8: Aśoka IV–Āṯār al-Wozarāʾ. London and New York: Routledge & Kegan Paul. pp. 896–898. ISBN 978-0-71009-108-6.
