= Dawlat Khatun =

14th century Khorshidi dynasty ruler of Little Lorestan in Persia

Dawlat Khatun was the 12th ruler of the Khorshidi dynasty in Little Lorestan in Persia in 1316.

She was married to Izz al-Din Muhammad bin Izz al-Din. After the death of her spouse in 1316, she succeeded to the throne herself. However, she was reportedly a poor administrator "who was not successful in managing the affairs of state", and therefore abdicated in favour of her brother-in-law 'Izz al-Din Hasan.
