= Salburi (tribe) =

Historic Lur tribe in Iran

The Salburi (Luri and Persian: سلبوری) or Solvizi or Salivarzi were a Lur tribe living mainly in the historic region of Lur-e-Kuchak in southwestern Iran. The tribe was a part of the Jangru'i (or Jangardi) tribe. It was historically powerful and connected to the Khorshidi dynasty and the Vali dynasty, although it later drastically declined.

== Etymology ==
The name of the tribe was historically listed variously. In Tarikh-e Guzida, it was written as Sivani, Silvani, Salburi, Shalburi, Salghuri, and in Tarikh-e Alam-ara-ye Abbasi, it was written as Salvizi, and in Tazkira-ye Ahval, it was written as Salivarzi. Some suggested that the native name of the tribe was Salbuzi, or more accurately, Salbuzhi. It was sometimes Arabized as "al-Salbuji". Minorsky wrote that the names "Salwizi", "Saliwarzi", and "Salawarzi" were incorrect and that their proper name was "Salburi" or "Salghuri". The Solvizi tribe was historically part of the Jangru'i tribe, also pronounced Changru'i or Jangardi, which took its name from its historic place of settlement in Kul-i Manrud, according to Tarikh-e Guzida.

Many of the successors of Shoja al-Din Khorshid carried the name "Abbasi", although the reason was unclear, as they claimed that the other Lurs nicknamed them Abbasi because of their ancestry from Abbas ibn Ali, while others claimed that the tribe of the Khorshidi family was nicknamed Abbasi as they were financially and bureaucratically tied to the Abbasid Caliphate.

By the time that Shah Abbas had installed Hoseyn Khan Solvizi as Vali of Luristan in 1597-98, the Solvizi tribe was also known as "Feyli", and afterwards all of the Lur and Kurdish tribes living under the Vali dynasty were called "Feyli".

== History ==
The Solvizi tribe was a smaller tribe of the larger Jangru'i or Jangardi tribe of Lurs. The Solvizi tribe also included the Khorshidi dynasty. Historically, the Khorshidis were sometimes incorrectly said to be from the Dirakvand, although they were from the Jangru'i tribe. There were several tribes descended from the Khorshidi dynasty, including the Mir, which claimed descent from Shahverdi Abbasi and was historically under the Dirakvand, as well as the Ghazanfari and Tolabi tribes, which claimed descent from Mir-Qaysar Khama-Bidal (brother of Shahverdi Abbasi), and the Zahrakar tribe, which claimed descent from Izz al-Din Husayn III.

The Khorshidis were named after their ancestor Shoja al-Din Khorshid, who came to power in 1184. After 1330, the governance passed to a different Khorshidi line which claimed Alid descent from Abbas ibn Ali, with the claim consolidating by the time Shah Ismail came to power. In 1597-98, Shah Abbas overthrew Shahverdi Abbasi and installed his cousin Hoseyn Khan Solvizi, marking the end of the Khorshidi dynasty and rise of the Vali dynasty. The Vali dynasty belonged to a different lineage of the old family of the Khorshidis. The Vali dynasty were also considered part of the Solvizi. Both the Khorshidi dynasty and the Vali dynasty claimed descent from Abbas ibn Ali, although Iskandar Beg Munshi wrote that the Khorshidi dynasty specifically were "fake Abbasids" unlike the Safavid dynasty who were "authentic Abbasids". When the Vali dynasty came to power, Khorshidi loyalists opposed them and the Solvizi tribe.

The Solvizi tribe was divided into the clans of Garmsiri and Taveri. The remnants of the Solvizi tribe in Abdanan were absorbed by the Kurdish tribe of Kordali, but continued to function independently. There were remnants of the Solvizi tribe in Khorramabad and Abdanan, and of the core Jangru'i tribe mainly around the villages of Boltaq and Gandomineh. According to Sekandar Amanollahi Baharvand, the Jangru'i in Boltaq and Gandomineh had settled there during the end of the Safavid period. Sekandar Amanollahi Baharvand added that the Solvizi also lived in Shush, Dezful, Andimeshk, and Shahrak Bahram.
