= Mir (Lur tribe) =

Lur tribe in southwestern Iran

The Mir (Luri and Persian: میر) are a Lur tribe living mainly in southwestern Iran. The Mir tribe is one of the tribes of Bala Gariva. The majority of the tribe speak a Northern Luri dialect and follow Shia Islam.

== History ==
The Mir tribe claimed descent from Shahverdi Abbasi, the last Khorshidi ruler. The tribe was traditionally divided into the clans of Mir Rostamkhani, Mir Mohammadkhani, Mir Mohammadtaher, Mir Gol-Andami, Mir Hossein-Ali, Mir Rezayi, Mir 'Âli, and Mir Karim. The tribe mainly lived in Bala Gariva, Kargah, Alvar-e Garmsiri, and Saymara. The Mir tribe was historically part of the Dirakvand tribe. At one point, the Dirakvand tribe included the tribes of Mir, Baharvand, Qalavand, and Zeynivand, although they all later broke off, leaving only the principal Dirakvand tribe.

Toward the end of the 19th century, the Mir tribe lost the Tayi valley to the Baharvand tribe. In 1914, the Mir tribe allied with the Baharvand tribe and conquered the Koregah (Khorramabad) valley. By the 1920s, the Mir tribe of Bala Gariva controlled its own land, while the Mir tribe of Saymara, affiliated with the Vali dynasty, was fighting amongst itself. The Mir tribe was defeated by Reza Shah and its lands came under government control.
