= Sagvand (tribe) =

Luri tribe living mainly in southwestern Iran

The Sagvand (Luri and Persian: سگوند) are a Lur tribe living mainly in southwestern Iran. The Sagvand are part of the tribes of Bala Gariva. They mostly follow Shia Islam and speak a dialect of Northern Luri.

== History ==
The name of the Sagvand tribe was commonly said to derive from "Saka", referring to the ancient Eastern Iranian people of Sakastan, as well as the closely related Scythians, which were also said to have been historically present around Luristan, Kurdistan, Azerbaijan, and Armenia, even having ruled Armenia. "Sag", "Saka", and "Sak" were said to have been used in reference to the Scythians. The name of the Sagvand tribe was composed of "Sag" and the suffix "Vand" indicating a relation or descent. The name Sagvand was understood to mean "Scythian". In Luri, "Sagvand" was often pronounced "Sayvan". In the name of the Sagvand tribe, "sag" may have also meant dog in Persian. It was also claimed that the Sagvand were among the Lur tribes of Arab origin, specifically from Banu Kilab, with Sagvand reportedly being the literal translation of Banu Kilab. Sekandar Amanollahi Baharvand noted that the Mokhtava clan of the Sagvand reportedly originated from the Sikavand, a historical Lak tribe living around Seykavand-e Chavari, and also that the Sagvand tribe in Tuyserkan referred to themselves as Sikavand, and suggested that Sikavand might have been their original name which became Sagvand in Luri. Many of the original Sagvand tribe, which claimed Scythian origin, distinguished themselves from the neighboring Lurs, including those who were later attached to the Sagvand tribe. There were several places named Sagvand or Sakavand in western Iran which had a historical connection to the Scythians.

The Sagvand was considered one of the tribes of Bala Gariva. The Sagvand tribe had its own dialect of Northern Luri. Other Sagvand spoke Dezfuli. The Sagvand tribe was traditionally divided into the clans of Haji-Ali Khani and Rahim Khani, with several smaller clans within. In 1889, the Sagvand population was estimated at around 20,000-30,000. Minorsky mentioned the Sagvand as an important Lur tribe of Bala Gariva, which followed Yarsanism. The Sagvand, along with the Dirakvand, were loosely attached to the Bakhtiari. The Sagvand and Saki tribes were involved in a long and bloody conflict over land during the 1820s. Alongside the Bakhtiari and Qashqai, the Sagvand were one of the few tribes that officially received the titles of Il-Khani and Il-Beygi from the Qajar government. Sheikh Khazal sought cooperation with the Bakhtiaris and the Vali of Posht-e-Kuh to end the raids of the Banu Lam and Sagvand tribes. Towards the end of the Qajar era, the Sagvand tribe controlled its own land and was autonomous before being defeated by Reza Shah during the campaign against Lur tribes in the 1920s.
