= Mahaki (tribe) =

Historic tribal confederation in Iran

The Mahaki (Persian: مهکی، محکی) were a historic tribal confederation during the rule of the Vali dynasty. The region of the confederation was historically known as the Mahaki belt in the northern parts of Posht-e-Kuh, which later became Ilam province. It included many tribes of the region.

== History ==
The Mahaki were mentioned as a Kurdish tribe which lived in Dizh-i Mahaki which was governed by Annazid ruler Sorkhab. During the rule of the Vali dynasty, the southern regions of Posht-e-Kuh were called the "Kord belt", while the northern regions were called the "Mahaki belt". Both regions were named after the tribal confederations. Mehmed Hurşid Paşa listed the Mahaki among the Feyli Kurdish tribes of Posht-e-Kuh. A list of the Mahaki tribes included the tribes of Malekshahi, Gachi, Shuhan, Arkawazi, Khezel, Bijanvand, Hendomini, Ali Sherwan, Dostan, Mishkhas, Ali-Beygi, and Dehbalayi. Historically, while there was little information on information on the tribes of Posht-e-Kuh, historians generally mentioned the Kord and Mahaki as the two major Feyli tribes of Posht-e-Kuh Minorsky mentioned the Mahaki as a Kurdish island in Luristan speaking a dialect similar to the Kalhor. The Mahaki were also included in a 20th century list of Laki speaking groups.
