= Saki (tribe) =

Lur tribe in southwestern Iran

The Saki (Persian: ساکی; Arabic: الساكي), also known as Sulaki, or Sakieh, are an Arab and Lur tribe living mainly in southwestern Iran, mostly in Khuzestan and Lorestan. The Saki are one of the tribes of Bala Gariva. They mainly speak Arabic and Northern Luri and follow Shia Islam.

== History ==
The Saki tribe were one of the tribes of Bala Gariva. They were mentioned by Moinuddin Natanzi among the Lur tribes. Sekandar Amanollahi Baharvand wrote that they were possibly of non-Lur origin but had assimilated. Some claimed they were of Saka origin and that it was present in their name. The Saki tribe in the Shushtar region were plundered by Timur. During the 1820s, there was a long and bloody conflict between the Saki and Sagvand tribes over land. The conflict resulted in the defeat of the Saki, many of which were absorbed by the Sagvand. By 1915, the Saki were under the leadership of Hossein Khan and were based in the Zal valley along with the Mir tribe who they had an alliance with. There was also an Arabized section of the Saki with family ties to Ahwazi Arabs. The Saki tribe in Luristan was said to have been massacred to extinction by the Dirakvand, although the Saki continued to exist as an Arab tribe around Hoveyzeh, although some of the tribe still lived in Luristan where they were said to originate.
