= Hossein Qoli Khan =

Feyli Lur leader

Hossein Qoli Khan Abu Qaddara
- Preceded by: Abbas Qoli Khan
- Succeeded by: Ghulamreza Khan

Personal details
- Born: Hossein Qoli Feyli; 1834 Ilam province
- Died: 1 July 1914 (aged 79–80) Najaf, Ottoman Empire
- Resting place: Najaf, Iraq
- Spouse(s): Malekzadeh, Nazara, Hajiyeh, Hamida
- Children: Gholamreza Khan Feyli; Alireza Khan Feyli
- Occupation: Politician, state ruler
- Nickname: Abu Qaddara ‌Sarim-ol-Saltana Amir-e-Ashraf Amir-e-Touman

Hossein Qoli Khan (Persian: حسین‌قلی خان), or Abu Qadareh (Arabic: ابو قَدَّارَة), was a Feyli Lur vali of Posht-e-Kuh (Ilam province) during the Qajar era. He was one of the last leaders from the Vali dynasty.

== Life and rule ==
Hossein Qoli Khan was born in 1834 as the son of another Feyli leader who ruled over his own land. He rebelled against his father Abbas Qoli Khan in his youth and was exiled for several years to Ottoman Iraq where he wandered around in the Kurdish-majority cities of Khanaqin and Mandali. Hossein Qoli Khan later returned to Persia to continue his rebellion. In the conflict between Hossein Qoli Khan and Abbas Qoli Khan, many nobles and military leaders supported Abbas Qoli Khan, leading Hossein Qoli Khan to take refuge once again in Ottoman land. During his next rebellion, with the support and military assistance of the leader of the Laki-Kurdish Balavand tribe, Lotf Ali Khan Esfandiari, the ruler of Holeylan, he succeeded. His power increased so much that it had aroused the attention of foreign travel writers from Europe. Jacques de Morgan, during his visit to Posht-e-Kuh, noted that the locals always spoke high of Hossein Qoli Khan and every time they were asked about Posht-e-Kuh they would say "it all belongs to our governor".

He ruled from 1863 to 1900 in Posht-e-Kuh with authority. During this time, he not only created order and peace in his territory, but also managed to suppress the separatist rebellions that were created in the north of Khuzestan, Lorestan and even Kermanshah. Hossein Qoli Khan was a contemporary of Naser al-Din Shah Qajar, Mozaffar ad-Din Shah Qajar, and Hossein Gholi Khan Ilkhani. In Naser al-Din's official book, the name of Hossein Qoli Khan is mentioned among the powerful individuals of the country. Hossein Qoli Khan was given titles such as Saram-al-Saltana, Sardar-e-Ashraf, and Amir-e-Toumani by the central government and the Iranian army, and he received a jewelled sword from Mass'oud Mirza Zell-e Soltan, and because of this sword, he became known as Abu Qadara, meaning "father of the sword" in Arabic. There was no tension between Hossein Qoli Khan and the Qajar dynasty during his entire rule. Although a kind of mistrust was seen from both sides towards each other, this mistrust never led to a conflict and Hossein Qoli always moved with approval of the Qajar government.

=== Rule ===
During this time, he not only established order and peace in his territory, but also succeeded in suppressing the rebellions created in northern Khuzestan, Lorestan, and even Kermanshah that caused unrest in the region. During his rule, Ilam went through a period of rebirth in art, poetry, literature and architecture. The Vali also stood well against the Sunni Ottoman and Orthodox Russian aggression against the Ilam region, he carried out brutal attacks and massacres against them.

== Family life ==
Hossein Qoli Khan was a Twelver Shia Muslim and so was his family. He had many wives, which included two Kurdish sisters named Malekzadeh and Hamida, who were actually the daughters of Lotf Ali Khan Esfandiari. He also married two Arab women named Nazara, the daughter of Hatem Bey of the Judaki tribe, and Hajiya, the daughter of Muhammad Sharif, from an Arab tribe in Zurbatiyah. Hossein Qoli Khan had only two sons, one was Gholamreza Khan from Nazara, and the other was Alireza Khan from Malekzadeh. Hossein Qoli Khan's other wives did not have children.

== Later life and death ==
In 1914, Hossein Qoli Khan's son, Gholamreza Khan, deposed him in a coup d'état. Gholamreza Khan exiled his father along with his father's government to the neighboring Ottoman Empire. Hossein Qoli Khan chose to live in Najaf, likely due to its religious significance among Twelver Shias. He lived in Najaf until his death on 1 July 1914, aged 80.

== Appearance and skills ==
He was described by as having a regal appearance, gentlemanly, and youthful. He was very tall, also had a long Sunnah beard, and long hair and was fair-skinned.

A Portuguese traveler described him as "beautiful, handsome and very appealing; unusually tall, of a well-framed figure; stout and large, with broad shoulders. His hair is black; he wears an unusually long beard and uses his left hand instead of his right. He is brave as a Caspian tiger and stronger than any of his masters; in the archery contests and fencing, of the ten apples struck down, he knocks down eight, and in battle he cuts off seven. The Feylite prince (Vali), respected for his pomp and religious observances, but feared for his ruthlessness".

== Legacy ==
Hussein Qoli Khan was also a poet and painter, he devoted much of his time to poetry and art. He was described as a pious Shiite Muslim, and as a protector of the faith, as he contributed to the construction of Shiite mosques spread Shia Islam into southern Iraq and defended his kingdom against Sunni and Christian invaders. Hussein Qoli Khan was known for using brutal methods against his enemies for example crucifixion, impalement, cutting their ears and burning villages which led him to earn the title the defender of the faith by the shia clergy in Qom and Najaf.

== Name ==
Hossein Qoli Khan was known as Abu Qadara. Many reasons have been narrated for this nickname. The name in Arabic literally means "father of the sword". It was alleged that during the time of the Ottomans, a number of Arabs attacked the border of Iran in the city of Changuleh, who were captured by Hossein Qoli Khan and had their ears cut off with a sword. Hossein Qoli then released them as a message to the rulers of Baghdad.

In fact, the most important reason given for the naming of Hossein Qali Khan as Abu Qadara was the suppression of Arabs from across the border. Nasser Rad believes that this nickname was given to him by the Bani Tarif Arab tribe, whom Hossein Qoli Khan defeated in a battle.

"He pushed back the Arab clans who had come to Iran to the banks of the Tigris River, and took a lot of casualties and loot from them, and that is why Hossein Qoli Khan became known as Abu Qadara in Mesopotamia, and he took that name with pride".

He was also nicknamed "Abu Saif":

"The Governor of Pushtkoh, Hossein Qoli Khan Abu Qadara, was given those names by the Arabs of Iraq and the tribe of Banu Lam, because this governor and his people used to steal from them and harassed them, they nicknamed him "Abu Qadara" and "Abu Saif", which means "the owner of the sword".
