= Shah Rostam Abbasi =

16th-century Khorshidi ruler

- Persian: شاه رستم عباسي
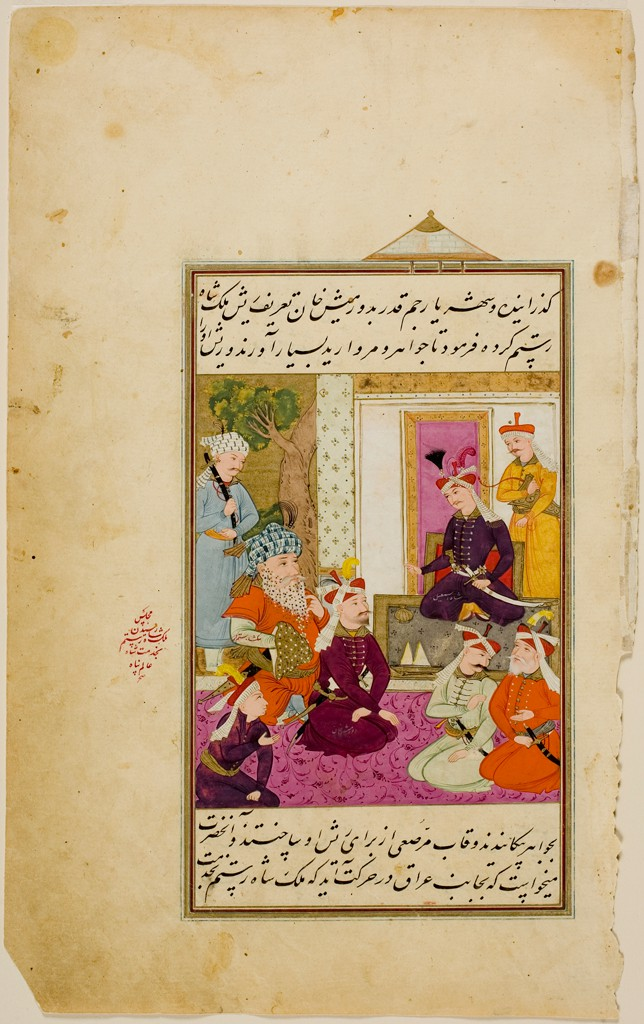
- Folio depicting Shah Rostam Abbasi in the presence of Shah Ismail I. Made by Mo'en Mosavver in Isfahan, dated c. 1688

Khorshidi hakem of Khorramabad and Lorestan
- In office Early 16th century – ?

Shah Rostam Abbasi (Persian: شاه رستم عباسي), also known as Malek Rostam, was the Khorshidi hakem (governor) of Khorramabad and Lorestan. He was the first Khorshidi ruler to acknowledge Safavid suzerainty, and was confirmed as a governor by Shah Ismail I (r. 1501–1524) in 1508. This part of Khorshidi history is obscure; the next known Khorshidi governor was Shah Rostam's son Mir Ughur ibn Shah Rostam, attested in 1540.

== Sources ==
- Floor, Willem (2008). Titles and Emoluments in Safavid Iran: A Third Manual of Safavid Administration, by Mirza Naqi Nasiri. Washington, D.C.: Mage Publishers. ISBN 978-1933823232.
- Spuler, B. (1987). "Atābakān-e Lorestān". In Yarshater, Ehsan (ed.). Encyclopædia Iranica. Vol. II/8: Aśoka IV–Āṯār al-Wozarāʾ. London and New York: Routledge & Kegan Paul. pp. 896–898. ISBN 978-0-71009-108-6.
