= Feyli Lurs =

Collection of tribes in Iran

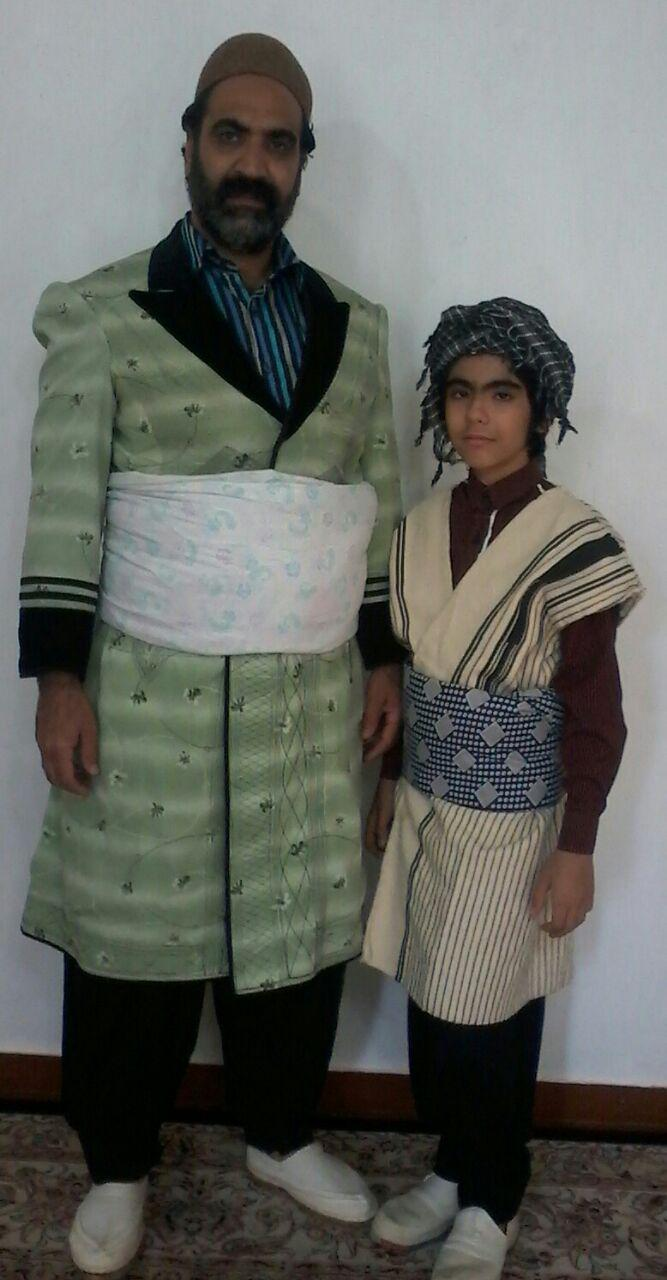
Feyli Lurs in traditional clothing

The Feyli Lurs (Persian: لرهای فیلی; also transliterated as Fayli Lurs or Feyli Lors) are a collection of Lur tribes living in the historic region of Little Lorestan, mostly corresponding with the modern Lorestan province of Iran. Their traditional homeland stretched across Dezful, Khorramabad, and Borujerd. Lurs who spoke Northern Luri were considered Feyli. Their dialect is almost identical to that of standard Persian.

== History ==
The Safavid-era document Taḏkīrāt al-Mulūk mentioned Lur tribes known as the "Fayli" or "Abbasi". All of the tribes in Lorestan were known as "Feyli" during the two centuries that the entire territory of Lorestan was governed by the Vali dynasty, which descended from Hoseyn Khan Solvizi, who had received the governorship of the province by Shah Abbas I (r. 1588–1629) in 1593. However, this started to change the start of the 19th century. The eastern portion of Lorestan, Pish-e Kuh, was taken by Mohammad-Ali Mirza Dowlatshah, the governor-general of Kermanshah and the oldest son of Fath-Ali Shah Qajar (r. 1797–1834). The governor of Lorestan was thus only left in control of Posht-e Kuh, the western portion. The word "Feyli" then came to refer exclusively to those tribes in the Posht-e Kuh since it had previously been connected to the Solvizi family. The tribes of modern Luristan were referred to as the "Lur proper".

The Feyli Lurs spoke the Feyli dialect of the Luri language, which was more commonly called "northern Luri", "Luristani" or "Luri proper". Not much reliable data has been collected about the Feylis of Posht-e Kuh.

There also exists a Feyli Lur community in the Fars province, which has resided there since they went along with the Zand ruler Karim Khan Zand (r. 1751–1779). In 1849, it consisted of 100 families. Eventually, some of them became part of the Amali tribe of the Qashqai confederation, which is documented in the Fars-Nama-ye Naseri by Hasan Fasa'i. Others made Shiraz their new home; in 1939, Henry Field estimated them to be at 100 families, while Kayhan estimated it at 150 families in 1941. In 1956, they numbered between 800 and 1,000 people.

== Sources ==
- Floor, Willem (2008). Titles and Emoluments in Safavid Iran: A Third Manual of Safavid Administration, by Mirza Naqi Nasiri. Washington, D.C.: Mage Publishers. ISBN 978-1933823232.
- Minorsky, V. (1986). "Luristān". In Bosworth, C. E.; van Donzel, E.; Lewis, B. & Pellat, Ch. (eds.). The Encyclopaedia of Islam, Second Edition. Volume V: Khe–Mahi. Leiden: E. J. Brill. pp. 829–832. ISBN 978-90-04-07819-2.
- Oberling, Pierre (1999). "Feylī". Encyclopaedia Iranica.
