= Vand (suffix) =

Vand (Persian: ـوند), also spelled wand, or avand and awand (Persian: آوند), is an Iranian suffix historically denoting an affiliation, descent, or relation. It is found in adjectives, nouns, proper names, and toponyms. It has appeared in family names of various Iranian peoples.

== Etymology ==
The suffix "vand" reportedly derived from the Avestan suffix "vant" or "āvant", and shifted to "vand" and "āvand" in Pahlavi. Wilhelm Eilers placed the personal names with the suffix "vand" in the same category as "band" (meaning "servant") and added that it had no connection with the Old Persian suffix "vant", but was analogous to that of "relative, dependent". He also wrote that several place names derived their names from tribe names, which derived it from their founder, and that some of the names which evolved in this way in the toponomy of southwestern Iran have retained the "b" of "band", such as Farashband and Esmailband to the west of Firuzabad. It was essentially a patronymic. According to Soudavar, most Persian dictionaries wrongly equated the suffix "-vand" to the suffix "-mand", which denoted possession, whereas "-vand" denoted similarity and likeness. Pierre Oberling also described it as an Iranian suffix in the context of tribal etymology.

== Usage ==
The usage of "vand" in family names was historically prominent throughout Iran but began to decline after the Arab conquest, although it survived and appeared in several northern dynasties such as the Bavand and Qarinvand. Asfar ibn Shiruya was from the clan of "Vardad Avandan", while Makan ibn Kaki and Al-Hasan ibn al-Fairuzan belonged to the clan of "Fuladvand", mentioned by Abu'l-Hasan Bayhaqi alongside the "Darudvand" as noble Daylamite families. The Buyid dynasty were from the clan of "Shirdel Avandan". Al-Maqdisi mentioned the noble Daylamite families of Salarvand and Bazravand, while Ibn Isfandiyar mentioned the Tabaristani family of Lorjanvand. The families of Manivand and Khordadvand remained in Tabaristan by the Seljuk period. Later local dynasties of Daylamite origin included Anuzvand, Ismailvand, Naservand, and Kamyarvand, with the Islamization of Iran being evident in their retention of the "vand" suffix despite their adoption of Islamic names. At the beginning of the Safavid period, the suffix appeared in the name of two Gilak families known as Chikavand and Ishaqvand (or Ishaqiyye), as well as the Sheykhavand tribe from Azerbaijan. In addition to the Caspian region, the "vand" suffix also appeared among the various Kurdish, Lur, Lak, and Bakhtiari tribes in the Zagros mountains, such as Bakhtiarvand, Hasanvand, Hamawand, and Dirakvand. The suffix was increasingly associated with the Lak tribes by the Zand period.

== See also ==
- Zada
- Zai
