= Sorkhab Ayyar =

Final ruler of the Annazid dynasty

Sorkhab Ayyar (Persian: سرخاب عیار, "Sorkhab the Ayyarid"), or Sorkhab III ibn Annaz, was a Kurdish governor who served as the last ruler from the Annazid dynasty before it was replaced by the Khorshidi dynasty in 1184.

== Biography ==
Sorkhab Ayyar was the last ruler of the Annazids, a Kurdish dynasty affiliated with the Shadhanjan tribe. He was not to be confused with Sorkhab bin Badr bin Muhalhil, or Sorkhab bin Mohammad, who were two Annazid rulers before him. He was a descendant of the Annazid ruler Sorkhab who ruled Mandali and Dizh-i Mahaki. Sorkhab Ayyar ruled the Annazid emirate for around 56 years in total before Shoja al-Din Khorshid came to power. During the decline of Annazid rule, the last mention of the dynasty was in the 12th century when Sorkhab Ayyar became a ruler of Lorestan, which was made possible by an epidemic in 1048-49 which prompted the Oghuz Turks to withdraw from the region. Sorkhab Ayyar had governed over the region, including over the Jangru'i tribe. Shoja al-Din Khorshid was initially a Shihna of parts of Lorestan for Hisamuddin Shuhli, although after his death in 1174-75 or 1184-85, he became independent, and despite being from the Jangru'i tribe, fought against the tribe and Sorkhab Ayyar, besieging the stronghold of Diz-i Siyah, and deposing Sorkhab Ayyar after the inhabitants of Manrud surrendered the city, and establishing the Khorshidi dynasty. Sorkhab Ayyar then became the Shihna of Manrud under Shoja al-Din Khorshid.

The conflict between Sorkhab Ayyar and Shoja al-Din Khorshid was said to have begun over a rabbit while they were hunting. In principle, Sorkhab Ayyar was in a better and stronger political position, and attempted many times to kill Shoja al-Din Khorshid but failed each time because of Hisamuddin Shuhli supporting Shoja al-Din Khorshid. The hostilities between them persisted. Eventually, the subjects of Sorkhab Ayyar rebelled against him, accusing him of tyranny and complaining to Hisamuddin Shuhli, who appointed Shoja al-Din Khorshid to investigate their complaints. Shoja al-Din Khorshid obtained a pledge from the people that they would obey his rule, after which he encouraged the inhabitants to join him in even greater opposition to Sorkhab Ayyar. Around this same time, Hisamuddin Shuhli passed away, and the direct conflict resumed between Shoja al-Din Khorshid and Sorkhab Ayyar. After much deliberation, Sorkhab Ayyar saw it best to surrender in exchange for the governorship of Manrud, as he saw that most people of Lorestan supported Shoja al-Din Khorshid.

The Sharafnama mentioned that Sorkhab Ayyar and Shoja al-Din Khorshid were both local rulers in the service of Husameddin Shuhli. While hunting, a dispute broke out between Sorkhab Ayyar and Shoja al-Din Khorshid over a rabbit, and they drew swords against each other. Husameddin Shuhli managed to separate them, but they remained enemies afterwards. Husameddin Shuhli appointed Sorkhab Ayyar and Shoja al-Din Khorshid to different parts of Lur-e-Kuchak, although after he died, Shoja al-Din Khorshid became independent and rose in influence, gradually pushing Sorkhab Ayyar out of power. Eventually, all of Lur-e-Kuchak came under Shoja al-Din Khorshid, and Sorkhab Ayyar reluctantly agreed to govern Manrud.
