= Annazids =

Kurdish dynasty (990/91–1117)

Annazid dynasty
- 990/991–1117
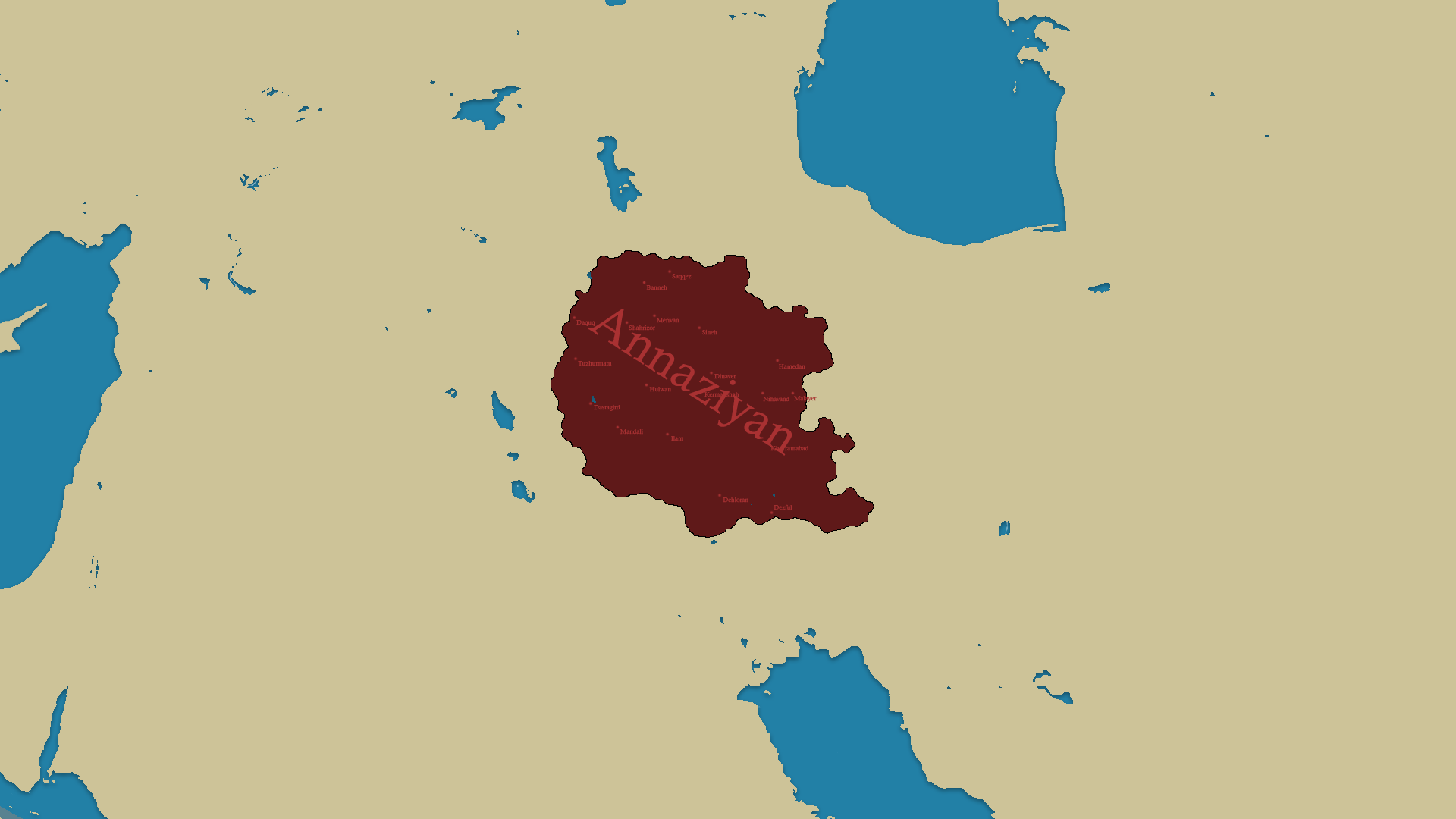
- Map of the Annazid Dynasty
- Religion: Islam
- Demonyms: Annazid, Ayyarid
- Government: Emirate
- History
  - Established: 990/991
  - Disestablished: 1117
Preceded by	Succeeded by
Buyid dynasty; Hasanwayhids	Seljuk Empire; Khorshidi dynasty
- Today part of: Iraq; Iran

The Annazids, or Ayyarids, also known as Banu Annaz, or Banu Ayyar, were a Kurdish dynasty which ruled over an oscillating territory that later became the borderlands between Iran and Iraq. The Annazids ruled from 990-991 until around 1117, although they survived as late as the 12th century. They had replaced the Hasanwayhid dynasty. After the Annazids collapsed, their territory was incorporated by the Khorshidi dynasty.

== Etymology ==
Ali ibn al-Athir stated that the name "ʿAnnāz" (عناز) derived from the word "ʿanz" (عنز) meaning "she-goat", and signified an owner, merchant, or shepherd of goats. However, Sharafkhan Bidlisi and Hamdallah Mustawfi referred to the dynasty as "Banū ʿAyyār" (بنو عيار), arguing that the Arabic word "ʿayyār", meaning "smart" or "shrewd", was also common in Kurdish and Persian, and was used as a nickname among Kurdish families, while neither "ʿanz" nor "ʿannāz" were mentioned in Kurdish dictionaries. Minorsky claimed that "ʿAyyar" (عيار) was a misspelling of "ʿAnnaz" (عناز).

== History ==
The Annazids were considered a Kurdish dynasty as both their rise and power were based on the Kurdish tribe of Shadhanjan. Minorsky suggested that the common use of Arabic names and titles possibly indicated Arab links within the ruling family. As a Kurdish dynasty, they were one of several native Iranian dynasties which rose in the period "between the Arabs and Turks", known as the Iranian Intermezzo, specifically when the Buyids were expanding westwards. The Annazids were based in the region that later became the borderlands between Iran and Iraq. The principal settlements which the Annazids controlled included Kermanshah, Hulwan, Dinavar, Shahrizor, Daquq, Daskara, Mandali and Numaniyah.

There were two main periods of Annazid history. During the first period, the family shifted between the external centers of Baghdad and Rayy, which were governed by the descendants of Adud al-Dawla and Rukn al-Dawla respectively. To the immediate west, the Shadhanjan Kurds were involved in the tribal affairs of the Arab tribes of Banu Uqayl and Banu Mazyad. To the east, they were separated from Rayy by the Hasanwayhid Kurds. During the second period, the Seljuk invasion completely disrupted their lives, and they relied either on the Seljuks, Buyids, or fended for themselves in various tribal combinations.

The founder of the Annazids was Abu al-Fath Muhammad bin Annaz, who governed in Hulwan. Hilal bin Muhassin calling him by the titles of "hajib" and "najib" suggested that he was attached to Baha' al-Dawla, and through him he established himself in Hulwan in 991 and ruled until 1010. In 997 he briefly seized Daquqa from Banu Uqayl, and in 999, he destroyed the family of Zahman bin Hindi, governor of Khanaqin. In 1002, he joined the campaign led by Hajjaj bin Hurmuz against Banu Mazyad, and entered the service of Amid al-Juyush later that year. In 1006, Abu al-Fath Muhammad bin Annaz was temporarily dislodged from Hulwan by Badr bin Hasanwayh and retired to Baghdad, although Ibn al-Athir claimed he died in Hulwan. Although the Annazids and Hasanwayhids were related by marriage, the two dynasties were also fierce rivals. The Annazids and Hasanwayhids belonged to the Kurdish tribes of Shadhanjan and Barzikani respectively, and there were clashes between the tribes as there were between the dynasties.

The son of Abu al-Fath, known as Husam al-Din Abu al-Shawq Faris, succeeded him in Hulwan, although his brother Muhalhil bin Muhammad became autonomous in Shahrizor in Kurdistan, as did his other brother Sorkhab in Mandali which served as the border between the southern Kurdish tribes and the Lurs. The decentralization led to many difficulties for the Annazids. In 1014, Shams al-Dawla, the Buyid governor of Hamadan, clashed with Hilal bin Badr of the Hasanwayhids, killing Hilal and capturing his son Tahir. When Shams al-Dawla was absent in Rayy, the Annazids occupied Qarmisin (Kermanshah), and when Shams al-Dawla returned to Hamadan, he released Tahir who quickly defeated the Annazids. Abu al-Shawq submitted to Tahir and gave him his daughter but suddenly killed him. Shams al-Dawla himself marched towards the Annazids but was defeated near Kermanshah, and the battle was witnessed by Avicenna.

By the time the Buyids of Rayy were succeeded by their maternal relative Alaa al-Dawla of the Kakuyids in 1007, the Annazids had expanded up to Dinavar and Shapurkhast (Khorramabad), which Alaa al-Dawla had occupied. In 1020, Abu al-Shawq supported Jalal al-Dawla against Abu Kalijar during the infighting of the western Buyids but insisted on their reconciliation. The same year, he was ready to assist Jalal al-Dawla when the Turkomans occupied Mosul. In 1039, he again occupied Kermanshah and took the castles of Khulanjan and Aranba from the Quhi Kurds of the Hasanwayhid federation.

In 1040, a war broke out around Dinavar between Muhalhil and Abu al-Fath, the son of Abu al-Shawq. Abu al-Fath was taken prisoner, while Abu al-Shawq marched towards Shahrizor against his brother Muhalhil. Muhalhil appealed to Alaa al-Dawla who annexed Kermanshah and Dinavar. As his other brother Sorkhab made a pact with the Jaf Kurds, Abu al-Shawq appealed to Jalal al-Dawla. Alaa al-Dawla was advancing towards Marj, and Abu al-Shawq took refuge in the castle of Sirwan. Alaa al-Dawla contended himself with Dinavar but died soon in September 1041. In 1042, Abu al-Shawq attacked Muhalhil, who fled, and Abu al-Fath died in captivity, and the brothers made peace.

In 1043, Jalal al-Dawla died, although the Annazids immediately gained a new enemy. In 1045, Tughril Bek sent his half-brother Ibrahim Yinal to the west, and Abu al-Shawq fortified himself in the castle of Sirwan while his dominions were overrun. He died in April 1046 on Ramadan. The Kurds rallied around Muhalhil, who rushed to recapture Kermanshah and Dinavar in 1047, and ousted Badr bin Hilal appointed by Ibrahim Yinal. Muhalhil possibly relied on other Kurdish tribes from Sharazur, as his nephew and successor Sa'adi ibn Abu al-Shawq felt as if he and the Shadhanjan Kurds were neglected by Muhalhil.

Sa'adi went to join Ibrahim Yinal around September 1046 and received Turkoman reinforcements, and read the khutba for Ibrahim Yinal in Hulwan. Sa'adi also occupied Mandali, and his uncle Sorkhab sought refuge in Diz-i Deloya with the Kurdish tribe of Dilo between Khanaqin and Sharaban, but then defeated and captured by Sa'adi and his ally, the leader of the Jaf Kurds. However, the Lur tribes, which were subjects of Sorkhab, surrendered him to Ibrahim Yinal who blinded one of his eyes, while Sa'adi was freed by a rebellious son of Sorkhab. As Sa'adi was not received favorably by Ibrahim Yinal, he returned to Daskara near Sharaban and sought the help of Baghdad.

Ibrahim Yinal appointed his relative over the dominions of Sorkhab and remitted Sorkhab to him to facilitate the surrender, but the envoy was defeated by the Jaf Kurds allied to Sa'adi. The Turkomans defeated Sa'adi and spread on the left bank of the Tigris, and Sa'adi sought refuge with the Arabs of Banu Mazyad. The castle of Sirwan, the last Annazid stronghold, was captured. Muhalhil also fled from Shahrizor around 1047. However, in 1048, a plague broke out among the Turkomans amid their sieges, and Ibrahim Yinal called them to Mahidasht. Muhalhil reoccupied Shahrizor, but in 1050 he was prompted to pay homage to Tughril Bek, who received him kindly and reinstalled the Annazids, with Muhalhil in Sirwan, Daquq, Shahrizor, and Shamghan, as well as Sa'adi in the two Rawands near Nahavand, and Sorkhab in Dizh-i Mahaki, which belonged to the Mahaki Kurds of northwestern Luristan. In March 1053, Sa'adi commanded some troops of Tughril Bek and advanced to Numaniyah where he captured his uncle Muhalhil.

At the same time Baghdad was occupied by al-Basasiri, Badr went to Tughril Bek to ask for the liberation of his father Muhalhil. Tughril offered to exchange Muhalhil for a son of Sa'adi he kept hostage, while Sa'adi, who disliked the offer, suddenly sided with al-Malik al-Rahim of the Buyids and revolted against Tughril. He was defeated by Badr and the generals of Tughril, while Muhalhil likely died at that time. Badr advanced towards Shahrizor, while Sa'adi remained in the castle of Rawshan-Qubad and even in 1054 the Turkomans were unable to dislodge him.

After the occupation of Baghdad by Tughril in 1055, there were no more mentions of the Annazids in historical sources, although some survivors of the dynasty were mentioned. Ibn al-Athir reported that Qarabuli, a Salghurid commander, attacked Sorkhab bin Badr in Khuftidhaghan and seized his treasure, out of which they sent a present to Berkyaruq. They occupied the dominions of Sorkhab except Daquqa and Shahrizor. Khuftidhaghan was later returned to Sorkhab. He died in 1006 and was succeeded by his son Abu Mansur. Ibn al-Athir mentioned the great wealth and numerous horsemen of Sorkhab, and added that the Annazids, by that point, had been in power for 130 years.

Nothing was known about Abu Mansur, and the Annazids were said to have collapsed by 1117, although in Tarikh-e Guzida, and later more clearly in the Sharafnama, it was mentioned that in the second half of the 12th century, under the Turkic governor of Khuzistan named Shuhla or Shumla, there was a governor in Luristan named Sorkhab. When the Turkic governor died around 1174, there was a power struggle between Sorkhab and Shoja al-Din Khorshid, the founder of the Khorshidi dynasty, in which Sorkhab was defeated and reduced to a Shihna in Manrud under Shoja al-Din Khorshid. Minorsky added that Sorkhab was undoubtedly a descendant of the earlier Sorkhab who governed Mandali and Dizh-i Mahaki, and with him the last Annazid scion disappeared.

About the Annazids, Franz claimed that it "appears that they neither won the support of local populations nor left behind a significant cultural legacy. Seen in the wider context of the period’s particularism, the increasing conflict between Būyids, Kākuyids, and Saljūqs discouraged the establishment of a political and socio-economic stability similar to that of the previous Kurdish regimes of the Marwānids, Shaddādids, and the Ḥasanūyid Badr."

== See also ==
- List of Kurdish dynasties and countries
