= Malavi, Iran =

Malavi ملاوي
- Village
- Location within Iran
- Coordinates: 33°15′49″N 47°45′45″E
- Country: Iran
- Province: Lorestan
- County: Pol-e Dokhtar
- Bakhsh: Central
- Rural District: Malavi

Population (2006)
  - Total: 73
- Time zone: UTC+3:30 (IRST)
  - Summer (DST): UTC+4:30 (IRDT)

Malavi (Persian: ملاوي, also Romanized as Malāvī and Malawi) is a village in Malavi Rural District, in the Central District of Pol-e Dokhtar County, Lorestan Province, Iran. At the 2006 census, its population was 73, in 21 families.
