= Torkashvand (tribe) =

Tribe in western Iran

The Torkashvand (Persian: ترکاشوند) are a tribe living mainly in western Iran, specifically around the provinces of Hamadan, Kermanshah, Ilam, Lorestan, and Khuzestan. They traditionally speak multiple languages and mainly follow Shia Islam.

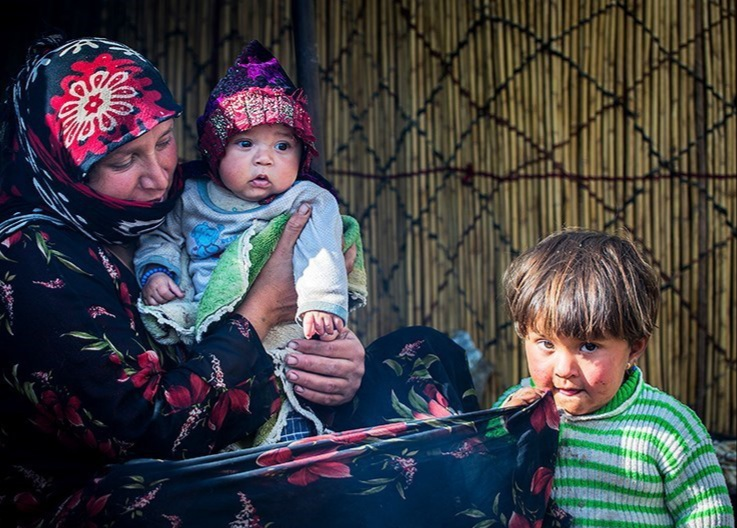
Torkashvand tribal family

== History ==
According to the Center for the Great Islamic Encyclopedia, the Torkashvand were originally Lak from the Selseleh tribes around Aleshtar, but left their homeland in the 1800s and migrated to Hamadan. A prominent claim suggested that after they settled near the Turks in Hamadan, they were called "Torkashvand", which derived from "tork-shodand", meaning "Turkified" in Persian, although the naming of the tribe remained unclear. Sekandar Amanollahi Baharvand described the Torkashvand as Lurs who spoke a Laki dialect and lived on the borders of the regions of Kurdistan and Luristan. However, others described the Torkashvand as multilingual, variously speaking Luri, Laki, Kurdish, Persian, and Turkic. Firuz Tawfiq wrote that the Torkashvand in Hamadan were traditionally considered Lurs, but had migrated to Kermanshah and came into contact with Kurdish tribes and adopted the Kurdish language, after which they were often considered Kurds. Eckart Ehlers also referred to them as Lurs speaking Laki, but rejected the assertion of Tawfiq, suggesting that they were more likely to be "the relic of an earlier Kurdish population that was once more widespread in the region or simply nomads who migrated away from their ancestral territory long ago." He added that the Laki-speaking Torkashvand were "often classified as Lurs because they dress in a similar fashion and come in close contact with them." However, "the Lurs always looked down on the Torkashvand" as they were poor in terms of land ownership. According to Jacob Black-Michaud, the Lurs did not see the Torkashvand as Lurs due to the way they sold dairy products.

The Torkashvand were traditionally divided into the tribes of Rahmati, Soleymani, Milijani, and Murshidi, each tribe named after its ancestor. The tribes were divided into as many as 120 clans, with the Rahmati historically being the largest and most important. Later on, the tribes lost cohesion as the Torkashvand in general declined by 1975. In 1998, the nomadic Torkashvand population was reported at 919 households or 5,222 individuals, dispersed across the provinces of Hamadan, Kermanshah, Lorestan, Ilam, and Khuzestan. The Torkashvand were the most important tribe which spent winters in Hamadan.
