= Baharvand (tribe) =

Lur tribe living in southwestern Iran

بهاروند; بهاروند

Regions with significant populations
- Southwestern Iran

Languages
- Northern Luri, Persian

Religion
- Shia Islam

Related ethnic groups
- Lurs

The Baharvand (Northern Luri: بهاروند, Persian: بهاروند) are a Lur tribe living mainly in southwestern Iran. The Baharvand are one of the tribes of Bala Gariva. They speak Northern Luri and mostly follow Shia Islam.

== History ==
According to Sekandar Amanollahi-Baharvand, the tribe of Baharvand traced their ancestry to Sabzvar, a Kurdish man from the Kalhor tribe in Kermanshah, who left his community after a feud, and settled in the village of Robat, north of Khorramabad. Sabzvar had a son named Karam, who was the father of Bahar. Bahar left Robat and migrated to Dare-ye Nasab, south of Khorramabad, where he met with Dirak, the leader of the Dirakvand tribe, who was impressed with Bahar, allowing him to marry his daughter and hiring him as his deputy and consultant for tribal affairs. At that time, the Baharvand became part of the Dirakvand tribes. Bahar had two grandsons, Morad-Ali and Kord-Ali, and under them, the Baharvand tribe was divided into two clans, Moradalivand and Kordalivand. It was also said that the Baharvand, along with the Qalavand, were not among the original nine clans of the Dirakvand, but had came later and absorbed most of them.

For a long time, the Baharvand tribe spent the summers in Dara-ye Nasab and the winters further south towards Dezful. At the end of the 17th century, it was forced to spend the year round in Dara-ye Nasab in the Korki region. Due to dynamic leadership and a growing population, after 1830, the Baharvand tribe underwent a period of expansion, becoming "one of the most powerful tribes of Luristan with substantial holdings of land". The Baharvand tribe took over the Chenara mountains and the plains of Reza, Chin-e Zal, and Bidruba after defeating the Sagvand tribe which had encroached upon its territory. By the mid-nineteenth century, the Baharvand tribe comprised four to five thousand tents on the hillsides, controlling a major caravan route, and the forces of both the central government and the Vali of Posht-e Kuh were ineffective against the Baharvand, and the other tribes in the region also could not withstand the Baharvand. Toward the end of the 19th century, the Baharvand moved northward, routing the Mir tribe and occupying the Tayi valley. In 1903, the Baharvand defeated the Papi tribe, reoccupying the Dara-ye Nasab valley and annexing the nearby Taf valley. In 1914, the Baharvand tribe allied with the Mir tribe and conquered the Koregah (Khorramabad) valley.

At one point, the Dirakvand tribe included the Baharvand, as well as the Qalavand, Zeynivand, and Mir tribes, although they later all broke off and the Dirakvand was reduced to only itself. Furthermore, several branches and smaller clans within the Baharvand, including Kordalivand, Reshno, Shalvand, and Najafvand, later grew and became independent.

The Baharvand tribe suffered greatly in the aftermath of the campaign led by Ahmad Amīr Ahmadi to quell tribal unrest in the region in 1923 and the forced settlement policy of Reza Shah. Hoseyn Khan, the leader of the Baharvand, and his brother, were both arrested in 1929 and confined for twelve years. They became completely sedentary and comprised around 5,000 families in 1963.
