= Hoseyn Khan Solvizi =

Politician in Safavid Iran

Hoseyn Khan ibn Mansur Beg Solvizi was initially the Lur hakem (governor) of parts of Lorestan from 1598, and then later beglerbeg (also governor) of the whole province. He also served as the mir of the Bakhtiaris. He was the first ruler of the Vali dynasty. Previously, the Khorshidi dynasty had held the governorship of Lorestan, with their last governor, Shahverdi Abbasi, being a cousin of Hoseyn Khan through his mother. From 1603 and onwards, the Solvizi family became the hereditary governors of Lorestan. Hoseyn Khan was succeeded by his son Shahverdi Khan in 1631.

== Biography ==
Hoseyn Khan was the son of Mansur Bek, who had married the aunt of Shahverdi Abbasi, the last Khorshidi ruler. Hoseyn Khan was a direct descendant of Abbas ibn Ali. Hoseyn Khan began his career as an intermediary between the Khorshidi rulers and the Safavid rulers before being appointed as the governor of Luristan. He also served as the Mir of the Bakhtiaris.

Shahverdi Abbasi, the last Khorshidi ruler, had revolted but was defeated and executed by Shah Abbas in 1598. Shah Abbas subsequently had all male members of the Khorshidi family either blinded or jailed, marking the end of their dynasty. Shah Abbas appointed Hoseyn Khan as the governor of Luristan, and by 1603 his family established hereditary rule. Shah Abbas removed the title of "Atabek" used by governors of Lorestan, and established the title of "Vali". After Hoseyn Khan was appointed as Vali of Luristan, he faced opposition from Mir-Qaysar Khama-Bidal. Mir-Qaysar Khama-Bidal was the son of Aliqoli Khan, who was the son of Khorshidi ruler Mohammadi and the brother of Shahverdi Abbasi. Mir-Qaysar launched a rebellion against the newly installed Vali dynasty in support of the Khorshidi remnants. Shah Abbas was forced to travel to Lorestan to suppress the revolt and consolidate the position of Husayn Khan.

By strengthening Hussein Khan, Shah Abbas created a strong barrier against the Ottoman army. Hoseyn Khan participated in several wars against the Ottomans. Hoseyn Khan was considered an important advisor of the Shah. Shah Abbas had entrusted Hoseyn Khan with bringing his drinking water from Kuhrang to Isfahan. In Tarikh-e Alam-ara-ye Abbasi, it was written that those assigned to serve the Shah were Hoseyn Khan, the Vali of Luristan, Imam Qoli Khan, the Beglerbegi of Fars, Jahangir Khan Bakhtiari, chief of the Bakhtiari, Safiqoli Khan, the governor of Hamadan, and the nobles of Fars and Isfahan.

The main achievements of Hoseyn Khan included countering the Ottomans and Arabs in western Iran. He died in 1631 and was succeeded by his son Shahverdi Khan.

== Sources ==
- Floor, Willem (2008). Titles and Emoluments in Safavid Iran: A Third Manual of Safavid Administration, by Mirza Naqi Nasiri. Washington, D.C.: Mage Publishers. ISBN 978-1933823232.

Preceded by Shahverdi Abbasi	Governor of Lorestan; 1598–1631	Succeeded by Shahverdi Khan
