= Shahverdi Abbasi =

Shahverdi Abbasi was the last Khorshidi Lur hakem (governor) of Lorestan from 1593 to 1598, with a one year interruption. He had succeeded his father Soltan Mohammad Shah and soon rebelled against his suzerain Shah Abbas I (r. 1588–1629), who subsequently marched towards him. Shahverdi fled and his nephew Soltan Hoseyn ibn Shah Rostam was appointed governor of Lorestan in his stead, with the exception of Khorramabad, which was given to Mehdiqoli Khan Shamlu. Shahverdi returned the next year and killed Soltan Hoseyn, thus restoring his rule in most of Lorestan. In 1595, the Safavids returned Khorramabad to him. Shahverdi soon staged another rebellion, but was defeated and executed by Shah Abbas in 1598. The latter subsequently had all male members of the Khorshidi family either blinded or jailed, thus marking their end.

Shahverdi's maternal cousin Hoseyn Khan ibn Mansur Beg Solvizi was appointed the governor of Lorestan, while Tahmaspqoli Khan Inanlu was appointed the governor of some of its parts close to Baghdad, such as Sadmareh and Hendamin.

== Sources ==
- Floor, Willem (2008). Titles and Emoluments in Safavid Iran: A Third Manual of Safavid Administration, by Mirza Naqi Nasiri. Washington, D.C.: Mage Publishers. ISBN 978-1933823232.

Preceded by Soltan Mohammad Shah	Governor of Lorestan; 1593	Succeeded by Soltan Hoseyn ibn Shah Rostam
Preceded by Soltan Hoseyn ibn Shah Rostam	Governor of Lorestan; 1594–1598	Succeeded by Hoseyn Khan ibn Mansur Beg Solvizi
