= Vali dynasty =

Former ruling dynasty of Luristan

- 1597–1928
- Status: Dynasty
- Capital: Khorramabad (until the early 1800s), Ilam (until 1928)
- Common languages: Persian, Luri, Kurdish, Laki
- Religion: Shia Islam
- Demonym: Feyli
- Government: Semi-autonomous monarchy
- Vali والی
  - 1597-1631: Huseyn Khan ibn Mansur Bek (first)
  - 1900-1928: Gholamreza Khan (last)
- Historical era: Safavid until Pahlavi
  - Established: 1597
  - Disestablished: 1928
Preceded by	Succeeded by
Khorshidi dynasty	Pahlavi dynasty

The Solvizi family, also known as the Vali dynasty, the Valis of Luristan (Persian: والیان لرستان), later the Valis of Posht-e-Kuh (والیان پشت‌کوه), or the Feyli Valis (والیان فیلی), were an Iranian Lur dynasty which traditionally ruled over Lorestan from 1597 to 1928. It came to power after replacing the Khorshidi dynasty, another Lur dynasty. The Vali dynasty was installed under the Safavid Iran with the main role of protecting the border from Ottoman incursions, and governed throughout the Afshar, Zand, and Qajar periods until the rise of the Pahlavi government. The Vali dynasty often alternated between opposing and supporting the government of the time. Ruling for over 330 years, it was one of the longest local dynasties in Iranian history.

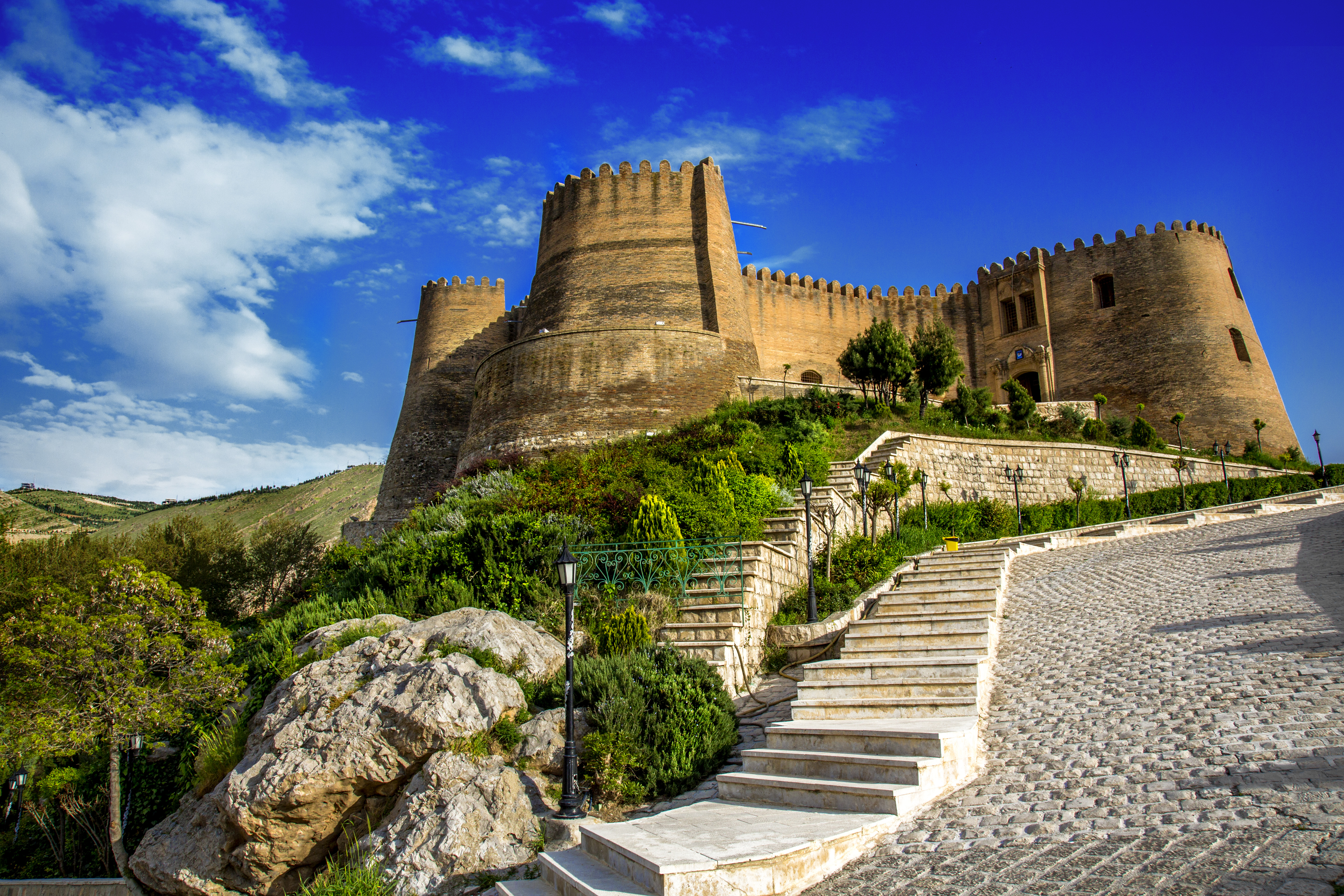
The Falak-ol-Aflak castle in Khorramabad, the traditional seat of the Vali dynasty

== Origins ==
The first of the Vali dynasty was Huseyn Khan, the son of Mansur Bek. Huseyn Khan, on his maternal side, was a cousin of Shahverdi Abbasi, the last Khorshidi ruler, who was deposed by Shah Abbas. Huseyn Khan and the Vali dynasty claimed descent from Abbas ibn Ali. According to most historical sources, Huseyn Khan had descended from the chiefly lineages of the Arab Rabia tribe. However, Iskandar Beg Munshi wrote that they did not descend from the Rabia chiefs, but from Arab migrants from Jabal al-Sumaq who initially settled on the Iran-Iraq borderlands near Lorestan. Regardless of which claim was correct, they were known to have Arab origins but had mixed into the local Lurs and fully integrated, being considered Iranian.

In his will, Gholamreza Khan, the last Vali of Posht-e-Kuh, described his family lineage, and said that the first Vali of Luristan was "Huseyn ibn Mansur al-Alawi al-Abbasi." Gholamreza Khan, in his book called Anis-ol-Mosafer, claimed that the first of their lineage to migrate to Luristan was Zahir, who was a descendant of Hamza Akbar, who was buried in Iran, and was a direct descendant of Abbas ibn Ali.

According to their tradition, there were two brothers, Zahir and Kaligh, who moved to the borderlands near Iran after internal conflict between the Rabia tribe. One day they set out with their caravan before being attacked and robbed by another tribe. Zahir, the older brother, pursued the attackers and recovered the loot, taking it from Iraq to Luristan, where they settled with the Dirakvand tribe. Due to his bravery, Zahir caught the attention of the Khorshidi Atabek Mohammadi. When Zahir died, his son Mansur grew closer to the Atabek and married an aunt of Shahverdi Abbasi, the last Khorshidi Atabek. Mansur then had a son named Huseyn, a maternal cousin of Shahverdi Abbasi who initially was an intermediary between the Khorshidi Atabek and the Safavid Shah, but had worked his way up the ranks, and when Shahverdi Abbasi was killed by the Safavids, he was appointed as Vali of Luristan.

== List of Valis ==
The Valis of Luristan, by order, were Huseyn Khan, Shahverdi Khan, Aliqoli Khan, Menuchehr Khan, Huseyn Khan II, Shahverdi Khan the Blind, Ali Mardan Khan Feyli, Ismail Khan, Kalb-Ali Khan (briefly), Hassan Khan, Abbasqoli Khan, Haydarqoli Khan, Ali Khan, Haydar Khan, Huseynqoli Khan, and Gholamreza Khan.

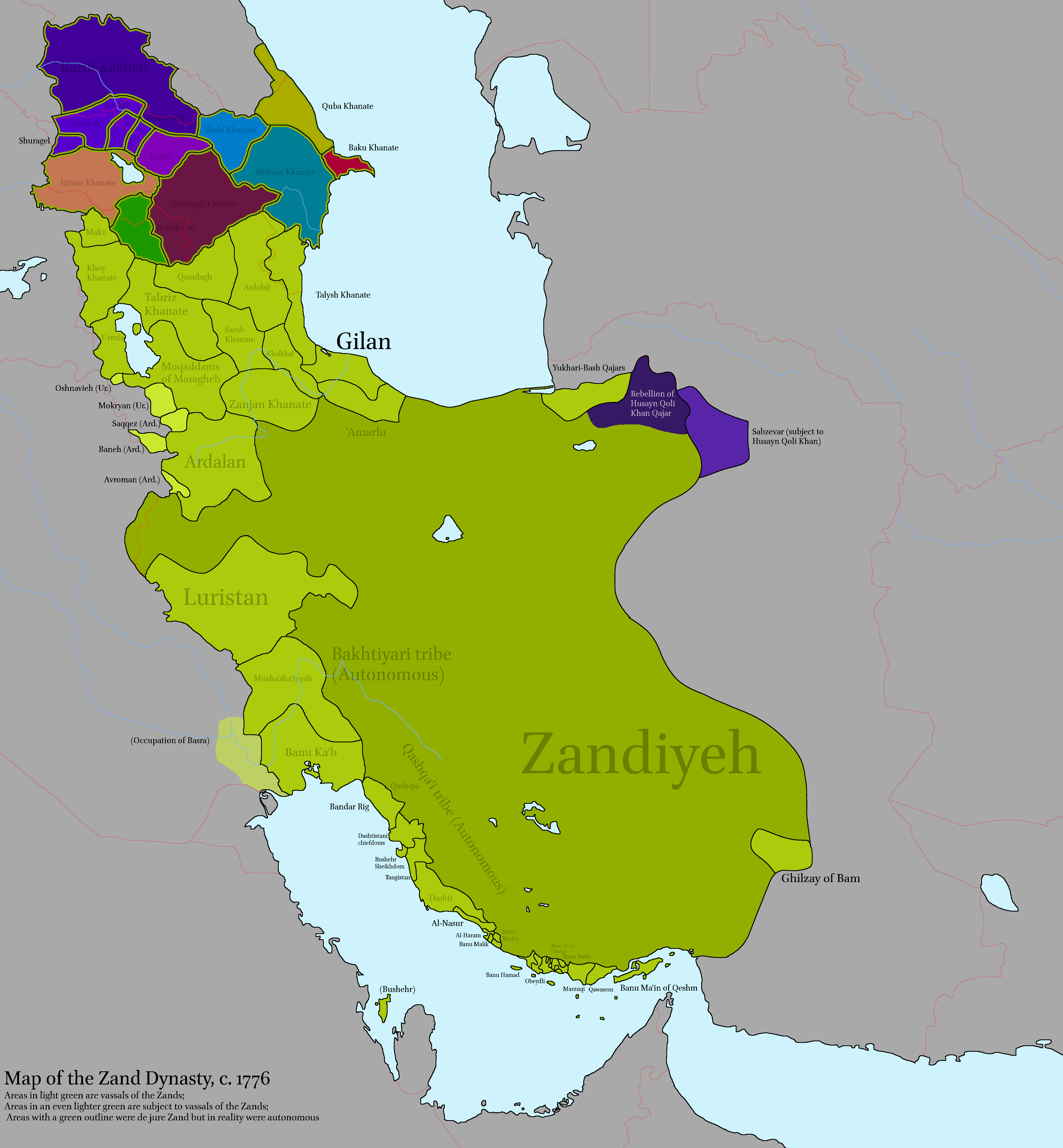
The Velayat of Luristan, under the Vali dynasty, in 1776 during the Zand era

== Safavid and Afsharid periods ==
After the Safavid Shah Abbas deposed Shahverdi Abbasi, the last Khorshidi ruler, he also removed the title of "Atabek" which was used by the governors of the Khorshidi dynasty, who ruled over the region of Lur-e-Kuchak. Shah Abbas established the title of "Vali" for the governors, and appointed Huseyn Khan as the first Vali of Luristan. Shahverdi Abbasi was executed in 1598 by Shah Abbas, and all the other males of the Khorshidi family were either blinded or jailed, marking their end. Huseyn Khan, through his mother, was a cousin of Shahverdi Abbasi. By 1603, the hereditary rule of Huseyn Khan and his family had consolidated. Huseyn Khan died in 1630-1631 and was succeeded by his son Shahverdi Khan.

Shahverdi Khan, the son of Huseyn Khan, defended the Iranian with the help of several Kurdish tribes during the Ottoman–Safavid War (1623–1639). He also captured many leaders of the Bajalan tribe and killed them. Shahverdi Khan went to Isfahan to meet the Shah around 1639. After a sheep walked past him, he tried splitting it in half with a sword to test his strength, but injured his own leg instead, and died 2 years later from the wound. As he requested in his will, Shahverdi Khan was succeeded by his son Aliqoli Khan around 1641, although the people disobeyed him because of his young age, and the Shah replaced him soon with Manuchehr Khan, a brother of Shahverdi Khan. During the rule of Shah Abbas II, Seyyed Ali Khan, the governor of Hoveyzeh in Khuzestan province, who was oppressive, was overthrown by the local Arabs in a coup led by his son Seyyed Huseyn. Shah Abbas II ordered Manuchehr Khan to govern Hoveyzeh, and Seyyed Ali Khan was exiled to Isfahan. The Arab Bavi tribe initially revolted against Manuchehr Khan but later submitted to him. Manuchehr Khan was never successful in Hoveyzeh due to his greed for horses and money, and he returned to Luristan after 2 years, and said that only the Musha'sha' were fit to rule in Khuzestan. Manuchehr Khan was succeeded by Huseyn Khan II, who ruled during the time of Shah Suleyman and then Soltan Hoseyn, and had a relaxed tenure.

After Huseyn Khan II died, there was a conflict between his sons Ali Mardan Khan and Shahverdi Khan over the position. Shahverdi Khan requested help from the Qizilbash, afterwards capturing Ali Mardan Khan and sending him to a prison in Kerman by order of Shah Suleyman. During the Afghan invasion, Ali Mardan Khan escaped prison, and Shahverdi Khan was initially worried, but later regained his trust. However, Shahverdi Khan tried to create sedition among the army of Ali Mardan Khan, which ruined his relations with the Afghans. Ali Mardan Khan ordered the capture and blinding of his brother who was then nicknamed Shahverdi Khan the Blind. Ali Mardan Khan ruled during a hectic period marked by the Afghan and Ottoman invasion of Iran. After Soltan Huseyn, Shah Tahmasp II came to power, although he was deposed by Nader Shah. Due to war with the Ottomans, Ali Mardan Khan had exiled himself to southern Luristan and Khuzestan, only returning to Khorramabad when Nader Shah restored Iranian authority there. Impressed with their service to Iran, Nader Shah installed Ali Mardan Khan as Vali of Luristan and Mohammadali Khan as his assistant. Around 1738-1739, Nader Shah sent Ali Mardan Khan to Kandahar and the Ottoman Empire with Mustafa Pasha to solve border issues, although Ali Mardan Khan died in Sivas from poisoning.

== Zand period ==
Ali Mardan Khan was succeeded by his nephew Ismail Khan, the son of Shahverdi Khan the Blind. He ruled during the fall of Nader Shah, and his tenure was also hectic and coincided with the power struggle between leaders such as Karim Khan Zand, Ali Mardan Khan Bakhtiari, Azad Khan Afghan, and Mohammad Hasan Khan Qajar. He initially allied with Karim Khan Zand and gave him asylum when he retreated to the mountains of Luristan and Bakhtiari after being defeated by Azad Khan Afghan. Karim Khan Zand was welcomed in Luristan where he recovered and rebuilt his army. However, when Karim Khan Zand fought against Ali Mardan Khan Bakhtiari, Ismail Khan sided with the Bakhtiaris. When the Zands defeated the Bakhtiaris and killed Ali Mardan Khan, Ismail Khan tried to attack Karim Khan Zand but was severely defeated. The Beyranvand tribe were the main supporters of Karim Khan Zand in Lorestan, while the Feyli Lur tribes under Ismail Khan opposed Karim Khan Zand. Karim Khan Zand installed Sabz-Ali Khan Zand around 1759 as governor of Lorestan, but he was soon overthrown by Ismail Khan, who claimed that the people of Lorestan did not want Sabz-Ali Khan Zand. The Feyli Lur tribes under Ismail Khan gave refuge and assistance to anyone who rebelled against the Zand dynasty, which caused Karim Khan Zand to invade Khorramabad, with Ismail Khan fleeing. Nazar Ali Khan, the brother of Ismail Khan, appeared before Karim Khan Zand and was appointed as governor of Lorestan. Karim Khan Zand believed that leaving the Vali dynasty in power in Lorestan would ensure the loyalty and obedience of the people. However, Ismail Khan once again returned and overthrew Nazar Ali Khan with the support of local tribes. Karim Khan Zand, whether willingly or unwillingly, did not engage in any more conflicts with Ismail Khan. Karim Khan Zand and Ismail Khan remained lifelong rivals. Ismail Khan was never completely removed from the political scene, and Karim Khan Zand only managed to limit his authority to Lorestan.

Ismail Khan, in his old age, eventually apologized and was pardoned by Ali-Morad Khan Zand. Under the successors of Karim Khan Zand, relations between the Vali dynasty and the Zand government improved. Despite improved relations for brief periods, the Vali dynasty and the Zand dynasty generally had hostile relations throughout the Zand era.

== Qajar period ==
After the death of Ali-Morad Khan, as the Zand dynasty began collapsing, Ismail Khan pledged allegiance to Agha Mohammad Khan Qajar, who recognized him as the governor of Lorestan, along with Khosrow Khan as governor of Kurdistan. Ismail Khan had sent gifts to Agha Mohammad Khan Qajar in Malayer to gain his support. Ismail Khan persecuted several tribes, including the Laks of Delfan, and many of them fled to Kermanshah. The good relations between the Vali dynasty and Qajars were brief and major differences arose. The tribes of Hasanvand and Beyranvand lost much of their privileges when the Qajars came to power and began revolting. They were the most troublesome for the Qajar government than the other tribes of Lorestan. The Qajars later seized Pish-e-Kuh from the Vali dynasty, which relocated to Posht-e-Kuh and became almost independent. Some sources incorrectly claimed that Pish-e-Kuh was taken during the reign of Agha Mohammad Khan Qajar, although he had been the one who recognized Ismail Khan as the Vali of Luristan after being sent gifts.

By the time Fath-Ali Shah Qajar was in power, Pish-e-Kuh was fully taken by the Qajars, while the authority of the Valis of Luristan became limited to Posht-e-Kuh, and they were called the Valis of Posht-e-Kuh afterwards. Pish-e-Kuh was taken by the Qajars at the very beginning of the 19th century. The government of Kermanshah province, during the governorship of Mohammad-Ali Mirza Dowlatshah from 1789-1821, took control of Pish-e-Kuh. After Ismail Khan, his son Kalb-Ali Khan briefly became Vali of Posht-e-Kuh, but was killed by his cousins during the Ottoman invasion. Hasan Khan, who was the nephew of Kalb-Ali Khan, and grandson of Ismail Khan through his son Asad Khan, came to power during the rule of Fath-Ali Shah Qajar. When the capital city of Khorramabad was taken by the Qajars, Hasan Khan established another capital westwards in the city of Ilam, to remain in power. The Qajars tolerated him as he defended the Iranian border from the Ottomans. Hasan Khan was appointed as the Vali because Ismail Khan had three sons, Mohammad Khan, Asad Khan, and Kalb-Ali Khan, all of whom died during his lifetime.

Before the Qajar took Pish-e-Kuh, the Vali dynasty did not directly rule Posht-e-Kuh, which was ruled by subordinate khans or local tribe leaders. Posht-e-Kuh had been merely a pasture for livestock of nomadic tribes due to its environmental conditions, border location, and unimportance. Pish-e-Kuh was more developed, although it was almost empty during winters as the tribes would migrate to warmer regions. Pish-e-Kuh was also more urbanized and in close proximity to many major cities. The seat of the Vali dynasty was the Falak-ol-Aflak castle in Khorramabad before it was taken by the Qajars. In Pish-e-Kuh, the Valis of Luristan sat on thrones in the fortress of Falak-ol-Aflak and were allowed to sit in the presence of various Iranian monarchs. After they relocated to Posht-e-Kuh, the court of the governor was a large tent held up by poles and they sat on carpets. The Vali dynasty had been reluctant to move the center of government to Posht-e-Kuh. By the time Fath-Ali Shah Qajar was in power, Pish-e-Kuh was fully taken by the Qajars, while the authority of the Valis of Luristan became limited to Posht-e-Kuh, and they were called the Valis of Posht-e-Kuh afterwards. The terms Pish-e-Kuh and Posht-e-Kuh were used from the Qajar era until the Pahlavi era.

Earlier, Mohammad Khan Zand was captured around Dezful by Feyli Lurs who handed him over to Hasan Khan, who blinded him and sent him to the court in chains to win the trust of the Qajar government. Hasan Khan had good relations with Fath-Ali Shah Qajar at the beginning of his reign, and Luristan was stable while most of Iran was in chaos, although their relations gradually deteriorated as Fath-Ali Shah Qajar consolidated his control. After the relocation to Posht-e-Kuh, Hasan Khan was in conflict with the central government. However, when the Ottomans invaded western Iran, Mohammad Ali Mirza Dowlatshah, who earlier captured Pish-e-Kuh, managed to make an alliance with Hasan Khan, and after he died, Hasan Khan entered another alliance with the central government.

Historical sources at the time rarely described the relocation to Posht-e-Kuh under Hasan Khan, although there were several claims. It was claimed that when Mohammad Khan, the last son of Ismail Khan, was killed by the Selseleh tribe, Ismail Khan ordered his successor Hasan Khan to take revenge, and after killing many of the Selseleh tribe, Hasan Khan wrote to Fath-Ali Shah Qajar that he only wanted Posht-e-Kuh, and to give Pish-e-Kuh to anyone he wished. Others added that Hasan Khan went to Posht-e-Kuh due to fears of retaliation by the Selseleh. Others claimed that Pish-e-Kuh was taken by the government of Kermanshah due to infighting between the Vali dynasty, while others claimed that Mohammad Ali Mirza Dowlatshah took it on his own wishes.

In the early years under Fath-Ali Shah Qajar, Huseynqoli Khan, the brother of Hasan Khan, began a rebellion, and Fath-Ali Shah personally went to suppress it. Huseynqoli Khan eventually surrendered and was given a government position in Qom, although he rebelled again shortly after in 1801, intending to capture Lorestan and Kermanshah and join the Ottomans. Fath-Ali Shah Qajar ordered Hasan Khan to prevent Huseynqoli Khan from fleeing Iran. Huseynqoli Khan had a counselor named Mohammad Qasem Beg, known as Mollah Barani, who was one of the leaders of the Beyranvand tribe. Huseynqoli Khan and his associates were tasked with protecting Isfahan, and they sought help from several tribes, but mainly the Beyranvand. He set out for Lorestan to request help from the tribes, although Mohammad Ali Khan, the ruler of Borujerd, and Aghajan Qajar, the ruler of Silakhor, refused him entry and forced him to flee. After he was ordered to assist the two governors in fighting Huseynqoli Khan, Hasan Khan set out for Lorestan and specifically inflicted devastating blows on the Beyranvand tribe, killing many of their chiefs and returning to Posht-e-Kuh afterwards. Hasan Khan was succeeded by his son Abbasqoli Khan. He was very cooperative with the Qajar state against rebellious tribes, most notably in one incident when the Delfan tribes advanced toward Posht-e-Kuh border before Abbasqoli Khan went with twenty horsemen to assist the Qajar prince in suppressing the Delfan. He was succeeded by his brother Heydarqoli Khan, who was cooperative with the Qajars, and nothing significant happened under his rule. Heydarqoli Khan was succeeded by Ali Khan, another brother of his, who was also cooperative with the Qajar state. Khanlar Mirza, governor of Lorestan and Arabistan, also controlled the affairs of the Bala Gariva region. The Sagvand tribe of Bala Gariva were also present in Posht-e-Kuh, and he feared that the Bani Lam Arabs would come to their assistance, and did not receive any assurance from Ali Khan. Before the leaders of the Sagvand tribe, Abdullah Khan and Jawad Khan, arrived to the Qalah-Su castle, they were intercepted by Khanlar Mirza who dealt a major blow to the Sagvand tribe, causing them to flee to the desert under Bani Lam protection. Nasiruddin Shah Qajar replaced Ali Khan with his brother Haydar Khan as Vali of Posht-e-Kuh, and Ali Khan fled. Haydar Khan was succeeded by his son, Huseynqoli Khan, who was appointed by Nasiruddin Shah Qajar in 1894-1895.

Huseynqoli Khan had a significant tenure and was mentioned by several European travelers. His tribal followers were deeply devoted to him, although he was not liked by all of his subordinates and his tenure saw many of his subordinates defect to the Ottomans. By order of Nasiruddin Shah Qajar, he and Heshmat-od-Dowla Hamza Mirza, successfully defended Posht-e-Kuh from Arab tribes who would come and loot the farms, pushing the Arabs to the Tigris River, and was nicknamed Amir-e-Tuman, Saram-ol-Saltana, Sardar-e-Ashraf, and most notably Abu Qaddara. However, the Arab tribes began to raid again afterwards. He died around 1900 and was succeeded by his son Gholamreza Khan. He was very similar to Huseynqoli Khan. Earlier around 1864-1865, Gholamreza Khan, by order of the Qajars and his father, led a devastating attack on the Dirakvand tribe of Bala Gariva, earning the nickname Fateh-os-Soltan from Nasiruddin Shah Qajar. His rule was known for being relatively stable during World War I, despite being surrounded by chaos. When the Ottomans invaded Iran during World War I, they were met by strong resistance in Posht-e-Kuh from Gholamreza Khan and were forced to retreat, and Gholamreza Khan further pursued them even outside of his area of authority. Around 1900, the governor responsible for Khuzestan, Lorestan, Borujerd, and Bakhtiari, was summoned to Tehran. Abolfath Mirza Salar-od-Dowla, son of Muzaffaruddin Shah, was appointed in those positions, and married the daughter of Gholamreza Khan. In 1903, Amanollah Khan Saram-ol-Saltana, the son of Gholamreza Khan, seized power in a coup and expelled his father, although they reconciled shortly after and he reassumed his position.

== Pahlavi period ==
After the overthrow of Ahmad Shah Qajar and the end of the Qajar dynasty, Reza Shah came to power. Gholamreza Khan felt as if the end of his rule was inevitable. He decided to relinquish his position when he realized Reza Shah would never accept his autonomy. Gholamreza Khan did not go to Tehran when invited by Reza Shah, instead relocating to Baghdad, Iraq, with his family and valuables in 1928-1929. Over 700 years of Lur automomy came to an end. The Iranian military immediately took over Posht-e-Kuh, which became Ilam province afterwards. Louis vanden Berghe wrote that "the tent village of the Lurs 'Husainābād' or 'Dih Bālā', the capital of the Walis, was conquered and its name erased forever from the map. In its place a new town was founded, called 'Ilam' which was intended to become the military and administrative centre of the territory of Pusht-i Kuh." Gholamreza Khan was assured that he would be safe if he returned to Iran, but he was distrustful, especially after the suppression of Lur tribes by the military, and the execution of the Lur tribal chiefs in Khorrambad despite earlier assurances. Mehdiqoli Hedayat claimed that after Yadollah Khan, the son of Gholamreza Khan, had requested amnesty, he signed a decree on September 8, 1929 and granted it. Gholamreza Khan died in Baghdad in 1939.

There were an additional four known as the Princes of Posht-e-Kuh. They included Alireza Khan Shehab-od-Dowla, son of Huseynquli Khan, who owned land in Holeylan, Ilam, gifted to him by his father, and he remained there after Gholamreza Khan fled to Iraq. Aliqoli Khan, also known as Yasan, the son of Gholamreza Khan, also remained in Ilam. He attempted a revolt in 1929-1930 in coordination with Mirza Farhad, a minister in the new Pahlavi government. The revolt failed and Mirza Farhad reconciled with the government. Yadollah Khan Alavi Feyli, nicknamed Ashraf-ol-Molk, son of Gholamreza Khan, also remained in Ilam, and revolted against Mohammadsadeq Kopal, an army general who governed the military administration of Ilam province after Gholamreza Khan fled. Yadollah Khan besieged the military headquarters but then fled to Kermanshah and later Baghdad where he reunited with his family. In 1948, Yadollah Khan was given permission to return to the city of Ilam, but settled in the city of Abdanan instead. Malik Mansur Khan Alavi Feyli, another son of Gholamreza Khan, had fled to Iraq with his father, where he settled and served in various government positions.

== Population ==
All tribes which lived under the Vali dynasty were called Feyli. During the two centuries when the Vali dynasty ruled all of Luristan, all the local tribes were known as Feyli. When the Qajars took control of Pish-e-Kuh, the term Feyli was reduced to only the tribes of Posht-e-Kuh, due to its association with the Vali dynasty. However, it was still loosely applied to the tribes in Pish-e-Kuh, and to those further south in Bala Gariva.

The Feyli tribes under the rule of the Vali dynasty consisted of Lurs and Kurds, as well as Laks. The Feyli Lurs were mainly concentrated in Pish-e-Kuh and made up the majority there. The Feyli Kurds were concentrated in Posht-e-Kuh and adjacent parts of eastern Iraq. Posht-e-Kuh had a Kurdish majority, with a Lur minority in the south. The Laks lived in the eastern parts of Posht-e-Kuh, and the western and northern parts of Pish-e-Kuh.

== Khuzestan offshoot ==
There was a related dynasty that ruled parts of Khuzestan province, which descended from Kalb-Ali Khan, a son of Ismail Khan who was the Vali of Posht-e-Kuh for a brief period before Hasan Khan. During the Ottoman–Persian War (1821–1823), he was killed by the sons of Aziz Khan, his uncle. After his death, his brother Hasan Khan succeeded him as Vali of Posht-e-Kuh. However, Yildirim Khan, the governor of Luristan (Pish-e-Kuh), had married a daughter of Kalb-Ali Khan, and then ordered Haydar Khan, a son of Kalb-Ali Khan, to settle in Khuzestan with the rank of Sarhang. In addition to Haydar Khan, Kalb-Ali Khan had three other sons named Baqir Khan, Ismail Khan, and Mehdi Khan. Baqir Khan became governor in Khuzestan and was succeeded by his son Karim Khan. The inheritance of Haydar Khan was passed onto his nephews when he died. Later governors of Shush and Dezful, such as Mohandes Habib Feyli, Farzi Feyli, and Shukri Feyli, were descendants of Kalb-Ali Khan. When Baqir Khan settled down in the Shush region, he had brought three Feyli Lur clans with him. He formed an independent tribe called Amaleh, which were later joined by nine more clans consisting of Feyli Lurs from Posht-e-Kuh and of Arabs from around Shush. The Amaleh of Khuzestan were distinct from the Amaleh of Lorestan and the Amaleh of the Qashqai.

== See also ==
- Safavid Lorestan
