= Dirakvand (tribe) =

Lur tribe in southwestern Iran

The Dirakvand (Luri and Persian: دیرکوند، دریکوند) are a Lur tribe living mainly between Khorramabad and Dezful in southwestern Iran. The Dirakvand are one of the tribes of Bala Gariva. They speak Northern Luri and mostly follow Shia Islam.

== History ==
According to Minorsky, the main groups of Lur were the tribes of Tarhan, Dilfan, Silsila, and Bala Gariva, and the first three groups were Lak Kurds, while the tribes of Bala Gariva were "the Lurs par excellence", and it was "possible that the Dirīgwand are the real nucleus of the Lur race." According to H. L. Rabino, the Dirakvand tribal chiefs claimed descent from Aqil ibn Abi Talib. The Khorshidi dynasty were also said to be from the Dirakvand tribe, although they were actually from the Jangruyi tribe. Amanollahi linked the name of the Dirakvand tribe to their historic leader named Dirak, while David Bivar wrote that non-Zoroastrian Mithraic beliefs persisted in Dirakvand tribal folklore, and suggested that their name derived from "Drugwant" in Avestan, roughly meaning "Follower(s) of the Lie", which was a term commonly used in Zoroastrianism, and an antonym of "Artawan" which meant "Follower(s) of the Truth". The Bala Gariva region spoke a dialect of Northern Luri.

The Dirakvand were historically known as highwaymen, especially along the road from Dezful to Borujerd, and they also robbed and pillaged each other, with blood feuds being "one of the chief pre-occupations of their chiefs." Rabino reported that part of the Dirakvand were massacred after they attacked the camp of Timur Lang. The Dirakvand were also reported to have been punished by Shah Abbas I on several occasions. At the beginning of the 20th century, the Dirakvand suffered further setbacks. Around 1900, the Dirakvand tribe was crushed by a joint force led by Heshmat-al-Dawla, the governor of Lorestan, and Hoseynqoli Khan, the governor of Posht-e Kuh. Many of the Dirakvand were taken prisoner, and several of their leaders were sent to Kermanshah. In 1902, the Dirakvand attacked the Bakhtiari on the Karun river 30 km from Shushtar, resulting in Esfandiar Khan Bakhtiari attacking and thoroughly defeating the Dirakvand. The Vali of Posht-e Kuh wished for the Dirakvand tribe to continue its lawlessness and raids so that the road from Dezful to Khorramabad remained impassable and redirected traffic towards Posht-e Kuh where he could reap the benefits.

By the early 20th century, the Dirakvand tribe consisted of two branches, the Baharvand and the Qalavand. The Baharvand consisted of thirteen clans, and the Qalavand consisted of twelve clans. The Mir tribe was another branch of the Dirakvand, along with the Baharvand and Qalavand. It was also said that the Baharvand and the Qalavand were not among the original nine clans of the Dirakvand, but had came later and absorbed most of them. At one point, the Dirakvand had four branches, the Baharvand, Qalavand, Zeynivand, and Mir. However, they all later broke off, with the Dirakvand tribe being reduced to its principal clan.

Jacques de Morgan wrote that the Dirakvand were known to rob travelers and initially did not receive his group well but ended up being polite when seeing they were better armed. According to Albert Houtum-Schindler, the Dirakvand included around 2,000 families in 1877, while Arnold Wilson recorded around 3,000 families in 1912, and Henry Field recorded around 8,000-10,000 individuals in 1928. The absence of later data on the tribe suggested that it was losing its distinctive identity. Ernst Herzfeld mentioned carvings on a cave in the Dirakvand region of Luristan which were connected to the Parthian period, although added that their exact date was uncertain. In 1928, during the campaigns in Luristan, Reza Shah dispatched forces led by Amir Ahmadi to subdue the Dirakvand tribe, after which they were defeated at the Korki mountains north of Dezful, and complete state authority was established.
