= Khorshidi dynasty =

Lur dynasty that ruled parts of Lorestan, Iran between 1184 and 1597

- 1184–1597
- Status: Dynasty
- Capital: Khorramabad
- Common languages: Luri, Kurdish, Persian
- Religion: Islam
- Government: Monarchy
- Atabeg اتابک, Vali ولی
  - 1174/1184–1224: Shoja al-Din Khorshid ibn Ali (first)
  - 1593–1598: Shahverdi Abbasi (last)
- Historical era: Middle Ages
  - Established: 1184
  - Disestablished: 1597
| Preceded by | Succeeded by |
| Annazids | Vali dynasty |

The Khorshidi dynasty (خورشیدیان), Abbasi dynasty or Shahs of Little Lorestan (لُرستان کُوچک) (1597–1184) was a Lur dynasty that ruled Little Lorestan in the later Middle Ages from their capital Khorramabad.

They were neighbours of the Hazaraspids who ruled over Greater Lorestan. While the Hazaraspids were more politically important because of their vast territory and the fact that they held major communications routes, the Khorsidi dynasty would become a significant power during the Safavid era due to the end of the Hazaraspids. The Khorsidi dynasty remained an important player in the rivalry between the Safavids and the Ottomans.

== Origins ==
The Khorshidi dynasty were Lurs from the Salburi clan of the Jangru'i tribe. It was also under their rule when the Lur ethnic identity consolidated in Luristan. After 1330, the power passed to another Khorshidi line which claimed Alid descent.

The name of the Khorshidi dynasty was commonly said to derive from their founder Shoja al-Din Khorshid. Minorsky added that it also could have derived from Muhammad Khorshid, the vizier of the former rulers of Lorestan before the rise of the Khorshidis. The successors of Shoja al-Din Khorshid often carried the name "Abbasi", although the reason for it was unclear. Some suggested that it referred to their claim of ancestry from Abbas ibn Ali, while others suggested that it was because of their financial and bureaucratic ties to the Abbasid Caliphate.

== History ==
The ancestors of Shoja al-Din Khorshid had entered the service of Husamuddin Shuhli, a Turkic lord who governed Luristan and Khuzestan towards the end of the Seljuk period. Shoja al-Din Khorshid was later appointed by Husamuddin as a Shihna over parts of Luristan, although after the death of Husamuddin Shuhli around 1174-75 or 1184-85, Shoja al-Din Khorshid became the independent lord of Lur-e-Kuchak, also deposing his rival Sorkhab Ayyar of the Annazids and defeating his own tribe of Jangru'i which was under the governance of Sorkhab Ayyar at the time. He also drove back the Bayat Turks ravaging Luristan. Before Shoja al-Din Khorshid came to power, the tribes of Lur-e-Kuchak were directly under the caliphs and exposed to invasions in the north. He died around 1224, and his son Badr was killed by his nephew Sayf al-Din Rostam bin Nur al-Din.

Sayf al-Din Rostam bin Nur al-Din was generally seen as a good ruler and was succeeded by his brothers Sharaf al-Din Abu Bakr and then Izz al-Din Garshasp, who married the widow of Abu Bakr, Maliks Khatun, the sister of Sulayman Shah Aywa, commander-in-chief of Al-Mu'tasim. Husamuddin bin Khalil bin Badr bin Shoja later killed Garshasp and a power struggle ensued between him and Sulayman Shah Aywa in which he took Bahar near Hamadan but was finally defeated near Khorramabad in 1242. Badr al-Din Masud, the brother of Husamuddin bin Khalil bin Badr bin Shoja, was an authority on Shafi'i law who went to the court of Mangu and returned in the train of Hulegu Khan. He showed kindness to the family of Sulayman Shah Aywa when he was executed in Baghdad. Badr al-Din Masud ruled until 1260, and his sons were killed by Abaqa Khan, who appointed Taj al-Din bin Husamuddin Khalil, also executed by Abaqa in 1278-79.

He had two successors, the sons of Masud of whom Falak al-Din Hasan ruled part of Luristan, and Izz al-Din Husayn ruled the crown domains. They had 17,000 total troops and chastised the Bayat Turks, afterwards established control over all the lands between Hamadan and Shushtar, and between Isfahan and the Arab lands. Both died in 1293. Gaykhatu appointed Jamal al-Din Khidr bin Taj al-Din as their successor, and he was killed in 1296 near Khorramabad by Husamuddin Umar bin Shams al-Din "Darnaki" bin Sharaf al-Din bin Tahamtan bin Badr bin Shoja, who relied on the Mongol tribes settled near Luristan for support. He was seen as a usurper by other rulers and had to make way for Samsam al-Din Mahmud bin Nur al-Din bin Izz al-Din Garshasp, who was executed by Ghazan in 1296 after he killed a certain Shihab al-Din Ilyas.

Izz al-Din Muhammad bin Izz al-Din was a minor, and his cousin Badr al-Din Masud was appointed as atabek by Öljaitü over prats of Luristan, although he later established full control. After he died in 1316 or 1320, his widow Dawlat Khatun retained some authority while the real authority was under the Mongols. This was also mentioned by Hamdallah Mustawfi. Mirza Iskandar also claimed that Dawlat Khatun married Yusuf Shah of Lur-e-Bozorg. Later, she was forced to surrender to her brother Izz al-Din Husayn who ruled for 14 years, and was succeeded by his son Shoja al-Din Mahmud who was killed by his subjects in 1349-50.

Izz al-Din bin Shoja al-Din was 12 when his father died. In 1383, the Muzaffarid Shah Shoja visited Khorramabad with his army and married the daughter of Izz al-Din, and his other daughter married Ahmad bin Uways Jalayir. When Timur arrived in Iran in 1386, he was told of the Lurs and their raids, after which he set out from Firuzkuh and reached Luristan by forced marches. The Timurids laid waste to Borujerd and razed the fortress of Khorramabad to the ground, and local leaders were thrown off of cliffs. The fate of Izz al-Din was unknown, and Minorsky added that it was unknown if he was one of the Atabeks of Luristan who were given an audience at Shiraz in 1387 by Timur. According to Mirza Iskandar, Izz al-Din was captured in 1388 in Rumiyan near Borujerd, and was deported with his son to Turkestan, but they were both released after three years, and Izz al-Din helped the Muzaffarid Zayn al-Abidin rise to power in 1391. In 1393, when Timur returned to Iran, he went from Borujerd to Shushtar, and Luristan was laid waste by the troops of Mirza Umar, but Izz al-Din escaped. In 1395-96, Muhammad Sultan, governor of Fars, extended his authority over all of Luristan and Khuzestan. In 1402-03, Timur ordered the restoration of the fortress of Rumiyan, and the next year, the Zafarnama mentioned a courier from Nahavand which arrived in Baylakan and showcased the head of Izz al-Din whose skin was exposed and stuffed with straw.

Sidi Ahmad, the son of Izz al-Din, whose irregularity in paying tributes seemed to have provoked the punishment of his father, regained his possessions after the death of Timur in 1405 and ruled until 1412-13 or 1422. He was succeeded by Shah Husayn Abbasi, another son of Izz al-Din, who took advantage of the decline of the Timurids and plundered Hamadan, Golpayegan, Isfahan, and even went on an expedition to Shahrizor where he was killed in 1466-67 or 1468-69 by Baharlu Turks. Shah Husayn claimed descent from Abbas ibn Ali, hence the name "Abbasi". His son, Shah Rostam, supported Ismail I and the Safavids. By this time, the rulers of Lur-e-Kuchak had already adopted the theory that they were of Alid descent.

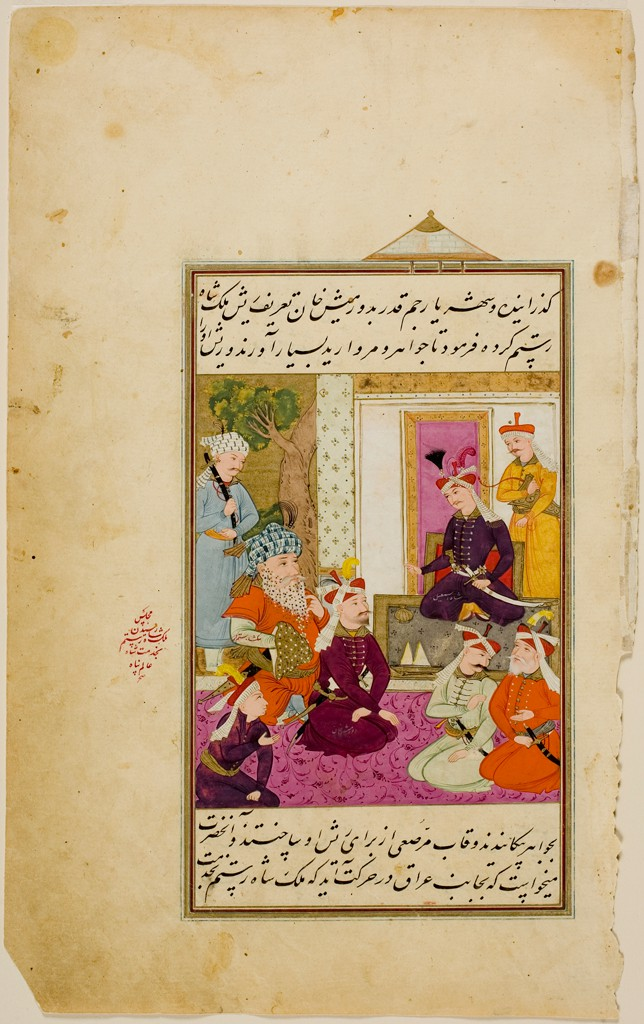
Shah Rostam Abbasi in the Presence of Shah Isma'il. Illustrated folio painted by Mo'en Mosavver, from a manuscript of the Tarikh-i `Alamara-yi Shah Isma`il. Created in Isfahan, c. 1688

Oghuz, or Oghur, the son of Shah Rostam, accompanied Shah Tahmasp in his campaign against Ubaydullah Khan in 1533-34, although his brother Jahangir seized power during his absence, and was executed in 1542-43. His son Rostam Shah was handed over to Shab Tahmasp by one of his subordinate governors, and was imprisoned in Alamut. Muhammadi, another son of Jahangir, was hidden by the Lurs at Changuleh. An impostor in Luristan introduced himself as Rostam Shah, although the real one was released and recovered most of his authority but had to hand over a third of it to Muhammadi. The governor of Hamadan, at the instigation of the wife of Rostam Shah, later seized Muhammadi and imprisoned him in Alamut. The sons of Muhammadi plunged Luristan and the neighboring provinces into chaos, while Muhammadi escaped prison after ten years and conquered Luristan while Rostam Shah took refuge at the Safavid court.

Muhammadi established good relations with Shah Tahmasp and Shah Ismail II, but after their death, he submitted to Sultan Murad III, which earned him several territories west of Iran, including Mandali, Badra, Jassan, and Tursaq. However, his relations with the Ottomans were soon strained, and he reconciled with the Safavids. After his death, his son Shahverdi bin Muhammadi, who had escaped from Baghdad where he was held hostage, received investiture from Shah Mohammad Khodabanda. Shahverdi showed signs of independence at the time Nahavand was occupied by Turks, but reestablished good ties with Shah Abbas in 1591-92, and capitalized on his claim of descent from Abbas ibn Ali as well as his professed Shi'ism. Shah Abbas married his sister, and married him to a Safavid princess in return. In 1593-94, in a pitched battle, Shahverdi killed Oghurlu Sultan Bayat, the governor of Hamadan who tried to levy taxes in Borujerd.

Shah Abbas was very enraged and immediately headed towards Khorramabad, while Shahverdi crossed the Karkheh river and fled to Baghdad. Luristan was given to Sultan Husayn bin Shah Rostam. In 1594-95, Shahverdi was pardoned and restored in his position, although he relapsed again, and Shah Abbas besieged and killed him in the fortress of Changuleh in 1597-98. Shahverdi had sought refuge with the Ottomans before being captured and executed, along with all Lur chiefs who were suspected of disloyalty. Shah Abbas put a small part of Luristan (close to Ottoman Baghdad) under a Qizilbash emir, and entrusted the rest to a maternal relation of Shahverdi, whose branch of the family continued to govern the province. Tahmaspqoli Inanlu became the governor of Saymara, Hindmas, and Posht-e Kuh specifically, while the rest of Luristan came under the cousin of Shahverdi, Husayn Khan Solvizi. This had marked the official end of the Khorshidi dynasty, and it did not survive the conflict with the Safavids despite having persevered through numerous family conflicts before. A lateral line of the family of Shahverdi, the family of Husayn Khan Solvizi also claimed descent from Abbas ibn Ali.

== Population ==
The Khorshidi domain had a mixed population of Kurds and Lurs, and tribes from both groups participated in the government.

== Sources ==
- Blow, David (2009). Shah Abbas: The Ruthless King Who Became an Iranian Legend. I.B.Tauris. ISBN 978-0857716767.
- Ehlers, Eckart (2021). "Khorramabad". In Yarshater, Ehsan (ed.). Encyclopædia Iranica (Online ed.). Encyclopædia Iranica Foundation.
- Floor, Willem (2008). Titles and Emoluments in Safavid Iran: A Third Manual of Safavid Administration, by Mirza Naqi Nasiri. Washington, D.C.: Mage Publishers. ISBN 978-1933823232.
- Matthee, Rudi (2011). Persia in Crisis: Safavid Decline and the Fall of Isfahan. I.B.Tauris. ISBN 978-0857731814.
- Matthee, Rudi (2015). "Relations between the Center and the Periphery in Safavid Iran: The Western Borderlands v. the Eastern Frontier Zone". The Historian. 77 (3): 431–463. doi:10.1111/hisn.12068. S2CID 143393018.
- Minorsky, V. (1986). "Luristān". In Bosworth, C. E.; van Donzel, E.; Lewis, B. & Pellat, Ch. (eds.). The Encyclopaedia of Islam, Second Edition. Volume V: Khe–Mahi. Leiden: E. J. Brill. pp. 829–832. ISBN 978-90-04-07819-2.
- Spuler, B. (1987). "Atābakān-e Lorestān". In Yarshater, Ehsan (ed.). Encyclopædia Iranica. Vol. II/8: Aśoka IV–Āṯār al-Wozarāʾ. London and New York: Routledge & Kegan Paul. pp. 896–898. ISBN 978-0-71009-108-6.
