= Little Lorestan =

Historic region in Iran

Little Lorestan (Persian: لر کوچک), also known as Lor-e Kuchek and Lor-e Feyli, was a region in Iran which roughly corresponded to the present-day Ilam and Lorestan provinces. From the 16th-century and onwards, it was also referred to as Lorestan. In the 19th century, the area was split into Ilam and Lorestan.

== Sources ==
- Ehlers, Eckart (2021). "Khorramabad". In Yarshater, Ehsan (ed.). Encyclopædia Iranica (Online ed.). Encyclopædia Iranica Foundation.
- Minorsky, V. (1986). "Luristān". In Bosworth, C. E.; van Donzel, E.; Lewis, B. & Pellat, Ch. (eds.). The Encyclopaedia of Islam, Second Edition. Volume V: Khe–Mahi. Leiden: E. J. Brill. pp. 829–832. ISBN 978-90-04-07819-2.
