= Piotr Bieliński =

Polish archeologist

- Born: 1948 (age 77–78); Bern, Canton of Bern, Espace Mittelland, Switzerland
- Board member of: PCMA UW; MNW
- Parent: Halina Bielińska

Academic background
- Education: University of Warsaw
- Thesis: 'Ubaid Północny' – Mezopotamia pomiędzy Dijalą a Haburem w latach 4800–4000 p.n.e. (1991)
- Academic advisor: Kazimierz Michałowski

Academic work
- Discipline: Archaeology
- Institutions: University of Warsaw
- Website: Piotr Bieliński publications on Academia.edu

Piotr Bieliński (born 1948 in Bern, Switzerland) is a Polish Mediterranean archaeologist, professor of humanities, specializing in the archaeology of the ancient Middle East. His research interests include the art - especially glyptics - and architecture of Mesopotamia, Syro-Palestine, Anatolia, and the Persian Gulf from the Chalcolithic to the Bronze Age. He has led over a dozen Polish archaeological expeditions to the Middle East.

== Biography ==
=== Professional career ===
From 1967 to 1972 he studied archaeology in the Chair of Mediterranean Archaeology of the University of Warsaw under Prof. Kazimierz Michałowski, and from 1969 to 1972 also in the Chair of Polish and General Archaeology of the University of Warsaw. In 1978, at the same university, he received a doctoral degree based on a dissertation on residential architecture in Syro-Palestine in the middle and late Bronze Age. He received his postdoctoral degree in 1991 based on his work on ''Northern Ubaid'' – Mesopotamia between Diyala and Khabur in 4800–4000 BC.

=== Positions and functions ===
Since 1972 he has been professionally involved with the University of Warsaw, where in 1994 he was appointed professor at the Department of Middle Eastern Archaeology of the Institute of Archaeology of the University of Warsaw (now Faculty of Archaeology of the University of Warsaw). In 2012 he was awarded the title of full professor. From 1993 to 1998 he held the position of deputy dean, and from 1999 to 2005 - the position of dean of the Faculty of History of the University. In 2005–2013 he was the director of the Polish Centre of Mediterranean Archaeology of the University of Warsaw (PCMA UW), and since 2014 he has been the President of the Research Council of the PCMA UW.

Bieliński is active in the scientific community of Polish Mediterranean archaeologists, as a member of the Committee on Pre- and Protohistoric Sciences of the Polish Academy of Sciences (since 2003, also a member of its presidium) and the Committee on Ancient Culture of the Polish Academy of Sciences (2003–2011). He also held a seat on the Scientific Council of the Department of Mediterranean Archaeology of the Polish Academy of Sciences (2000–2010) (since 2010 of the Institute of Mediterranean and Oriental Cultures PAS), and was appointed to the board of trustees of the National Museum in Warsaw for the term 2013–2018. He is also a member of the Warsaw Scientific Society (since 2013) and the Commission on Mediterranean Archaeology of the Polish Academy of Learning (since 2016). From 2003 to 2014, he served on the International Coordination Committee for the Safeguarding of the Cultural Heritage of Iraq established under UNESCO. He is a member of the Polish National Commission for UNESCO.

== Excavations ==
In 1974–1983 Bieliński participated in archaeological research in the Middle East conducted by the Polish Centre of the Mediterranean Archaeology of the University of Warsaw (PCMA UW). As a member of an expedition he worked in Palmyra (Syria), Tell Saadiya (Iraq) and on Bijan Island (Iraq). Beginning in 1984, he began directing excavations at PCMA UW at the following sites in the region: Tell Rijim and Tell Raffaan (Iraq), Tell Abu Hafur, Tell Djassa, Tell Rad Shaqrah, and Tell Arbid (Syria). In 2007, as the head of the Kuwaiti-Polish Archaeological Mission on behalf of PCMA UW, he initiated the first Polish archaeological research in the Arabian Peninsula region, which included excavations in northern Kuwait (Al-Subijah region and Bahra 1 site), as well as sub-projects on Failaka Island. In 2015, he expanded PCMA UW's work in the Arabian Peninsula by starting a research project in the Qumayrah Valley. In 2016–2017 he also led a Polish expedition to the Saruq al-Hadid site in Dubai (U.A.E.).
