= Tell Madhur =

- Location within Iraq Location within Near East
- 34°23′N 44°59′E
- Type: tell
- Periods: Ubaid period, Early Dynastic period
- Location: Iraq
- Region: Diyala Governorate

Site notes
- Height: 2.5 metre
- Length: 100 metre
- Width: 80 metre
- Excavation dates: November 1977–May 1978; October 1978–December 1978; March 1979–May 1979; October 1979–January 1980
- Archaeologists: Nicholas Postgate, T. Cuyler Young, Robert Killick, Michael Roaf

Tell Madhur (also Madhhur) is a tell, or archaeological settlement mound, in Diyala Governorate (Iraq). The site was excavated due to it being flooded by the reservoir created by the Hamrin Dam. Madhur is best known for its particularly well-preserved Ubaid house. A significant Early Dynastic occupation, consisting of a rounded building typical for the Hamrin region at the time, has also been attested at Madhur.

== The site and its environment ==
The tell measures 100 by 80 m and rises 2.5 m above the surrounding plain. The archaeological deposits extended some 4 m below the current surface of the plain as well, indicating that considerable soil accumulation must have taken place since Madhur was first settled.

== History of research ==
Tell Madhur was excavated for four seasons between 1977 and 1980 by the British Archaeological Expedition to Iraq as part of the large, international salvage operation to document archaeological sites that would be flooded by the reservoir of the Hamrin Dam in the Diyala River, which was being constructed at the time. Madhur is part of a large cluster of excavated Ubaid period sites, including Tell Abada, Tell Rashid and Tell Saadiya. During their work on Madhur, the British Archaeological Expedition also carried out smaller excavations at two other Hamrin sites; Tell Rubeidheh and Tell Haizalun. The excavations at Tell Madhur were directed by Nicholas Postgate, T. Cuyler Young and Michael Roaf.

== Occupation history ==
In the oldest phase at Madhur, no architectural remains were found. The Ubaid style pottery seems to have been very similar to that of level 2, the next occupation phase.

Level 2 represents the most significant occupation phase at Tell Madhur. The single most important feature of this level was an almost completely preserved house, described by Michael Roaf as "one of the best-preserved prehistoric buildings ever to have been found in Mesopotamia". The walls were preserved up to 2 m in height, built from rectangular mudbricks and supported by plastered revetments. The upper parts of the walls had collapsed, but by counting the number of fallen mudbrick rows, it could be measured that they were originally some 3.5 m high. Inside the building were found pieces of plaster with red paint, indicating that (some of) the walls were decorated. The freestanding building was relatively small, measuring some 14 by 14 m, and had a tripartite layout: a central, cruciform hall was flanked by smaller rooms, some of which could be closed off by doors, as indicated by the presence of door sockets. The building was destroyed by fire and everything in it was preserved in situ, meaning that all artefacts were still in the locations in which they were left by the original inhabitants of Madhur. The inventory included pottery vessels (both painted, incised and undecorated), grindstones, flint and obsidian blades, spindle whorls, animal figurines and many sling bullets. A large amount of carbonized grain, probably 6-row hulled barley, was found in one of the smaller rooms. This provided a radiocarbon date of 4470±80 cal BC. The house plan showed clear parallels in nearby sites such as Tell Abada and Tell Rashid and sites further north such as Tepe Gawra, Telul eth-Thalathat and even Değirmentepe in Turkey. The pottery likewise had clear parallels with northern sites such as Nuzi and Tepe Gawra. Based on the exquisite preservation of the artefacts, specific activity areas could be pinpointed within the house; some of the smaller rooms were used for storage and cooking, whereas one end of the central hall was used for eating and probably receiving guests.

The settlement continued to be occupied after level 2. These next phases also dated to the Ubaid period and consisted of houses that were constantly being modified. The exact stratigraphy of these later Ubaid phases were difficult to reconstruct due to later activities at the site that severely damaged and eroded these late Ubaid remains.

The excavators found no evidence for occupation during the Uruk period, but the site was re-occupied during the Early Dynastic period (ED). During the ED I period, a large building with a thick curved wall with rooms on the inside of the curve. The building was not completely preserved, but if it had been a complete circle, its diameter would have been 30 m. This curved building, and the pottery found inside it, has clear parallels in Early Dynastic round buildings excavated at Tell Gubba and Tell Razuk, also in the Hamrin region. The pottery and architecture seem to have set the Hamrin apart from the rest of Mesopotamia during the Early Dynastic period, suggesting that it may represent some sort of "cultural enclave". Several tombs from the Early Dynastic I-III and one from the Akkadian period were found as well. The Akkadian grave belonged to a young man, 17-20 years old, and contained pottery, bronze tools and weapons, and carnelian and lapis lazuli jewellery as grave goods, as well as two equid skeletons.

The youngest evidence consists of some storage pits indicating occupation during the 13th and 14th centuries AD, and the site was used as a cemetery by local villagers in recent times.

== See also ==
- Cities of the ancient Near East
- Tell Yelkhi
- Tell Suleimah
