= Lake Hamrin =

- Location within Iraq
- Interactive map of Lake Hamrin
- Location: Diyala Governorate
- Coordinates: 34°11′28″N 44°59′42″E
- Type: Reservoir
- Basin countries: Iraq
- Surface area: 340 km^{2} (130 sq mi)
- Water volume: 2×10^{9} m^{3} (1.6×10^{6} acre⋅ft)
- Settlements: Hamrin

Lake Hamrin is a human-made lake approximately 50 km (31 mi) north-east of Baqubah, in Iraq's Diyala Governorate. The town of Hamrin sits on the western shore of the lake, both of which are at the southern tip of the Hamrin mountains. The Hemrin Dam, which creates Lake Hamrin, was established in 1981 as an artificial dam to hold over two billion cubic metres of water. It is a source of fish and also provides water for nearby date palm orchards and other farms. In June 2008, it was reported that due to Iranian damming of the Alwand River, the lake had lost nearly 80% of its capacity.

== Archaeological excavations ==
In the late 1970s, prior to the flooding of the lake, several archaeological sites in the flood plain were excavated. Excavations were led by various international organisations, such as the British Archaeological Expedition, as well as the Iraqi State Organisation for Antiquities and Heritage. Sites excavated include the Ubaid period sites of Tell Abada, Tell Madhur, Tell Saadiya, Tell Rubeidheh, Tell Rashid and Tell Haizalun. The Hamrin sites probably shared a localised form of the Ubaid culture and possibly operated as one administrative unit based out of Tell Abada.

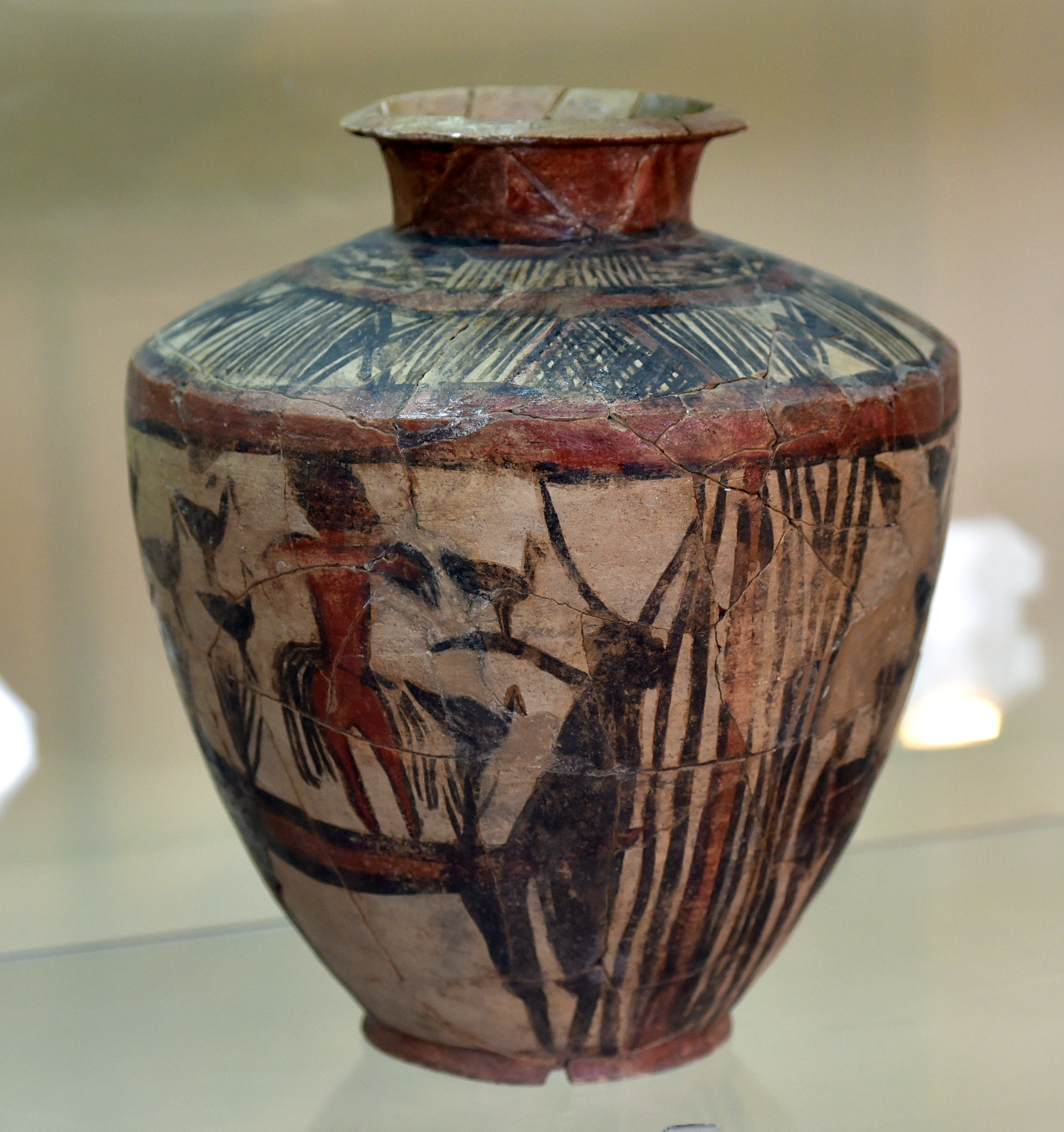
Polychrome painted jar, geometric designs and animals, the so-called "Scarlet Ware". From Tell Abu Qasim at Hamrin Basin. 2800-2600 BCE. Iraq Museum

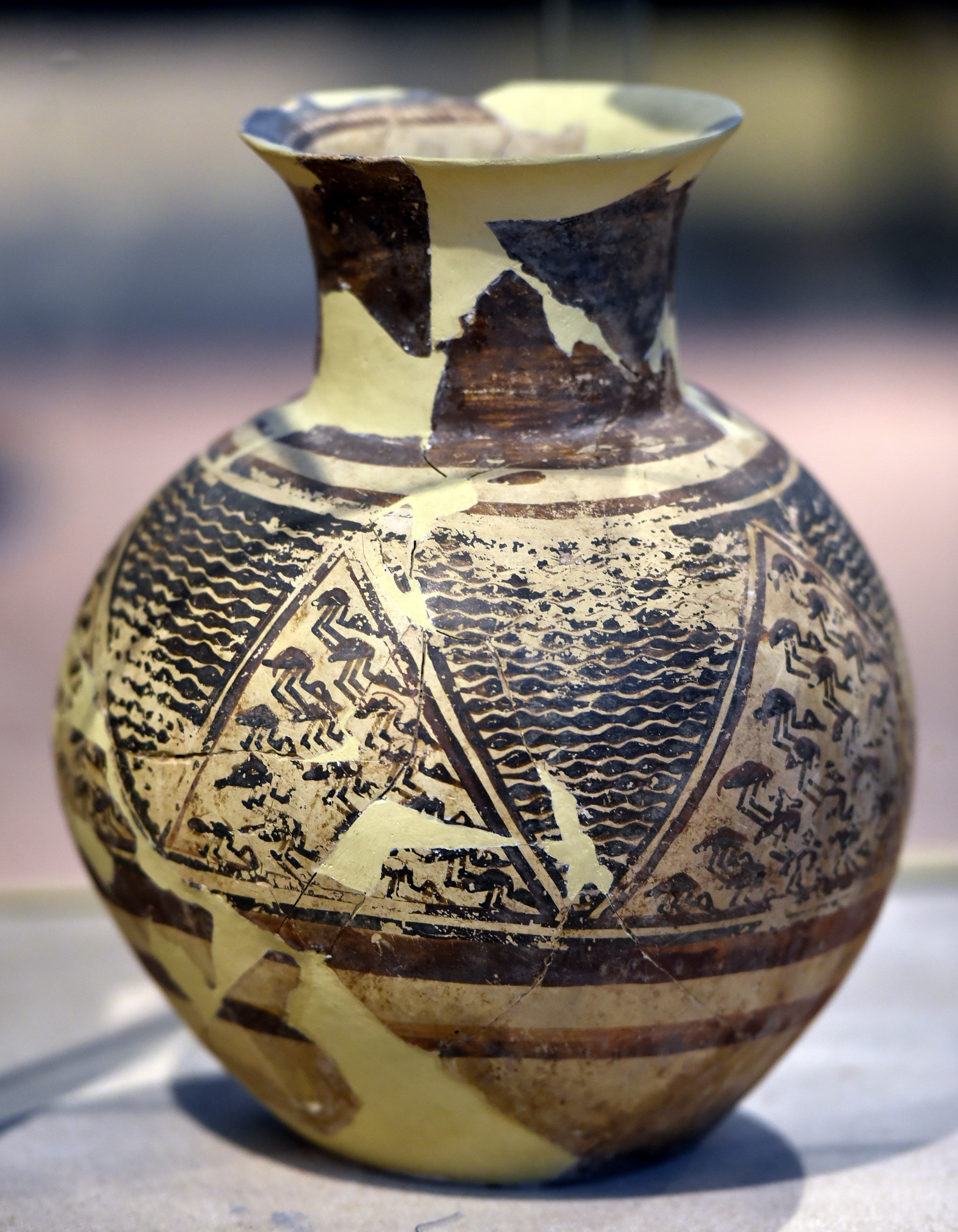
Painted pottery jar with geometric motifs and birds. From Tell Hasan at Hamrin Basin. 5th millennium BCE. Iraq Museum
