= Tell Deir Situn =

Tell Deir Situn was an archeological site 45 km north-west of Nineveh, located in Iraq. The construction of a new dam northwest of Mosul, Iraq, led to a 1985 British Museum team unearthing two Hellenistic ruins called Tell Deir Situn and Grai Darki. The dig at Tell Deir Situn produced large amounts of pottery, a bronze Assyrian fibula, and a Seleucid era coin.

== Invitation ==
The building of a new dam on the Tigris river, approximately 40 km northwest of Mosul, Iraq, threatened hundreds of archaeological sites spanning almost to the border with Syria and Turkey, providing the British Museum with the chance to get involved in Mesopotamian archaeology once more. The Iraqi government asked several international delegations to take part to make sure that as many of these sites were examined before being submerged under the lake that would form behind the dam. The British Archaeological Expedition to Iraq was a major player in this rescue effort.

== Location ==
Located close to the settlement of Deir Situn, east of the old Mosul-Zakho route and north of the road to Alqosh, lies Tell Deir Situn, a low mound encircled on three sides by a small wadi.

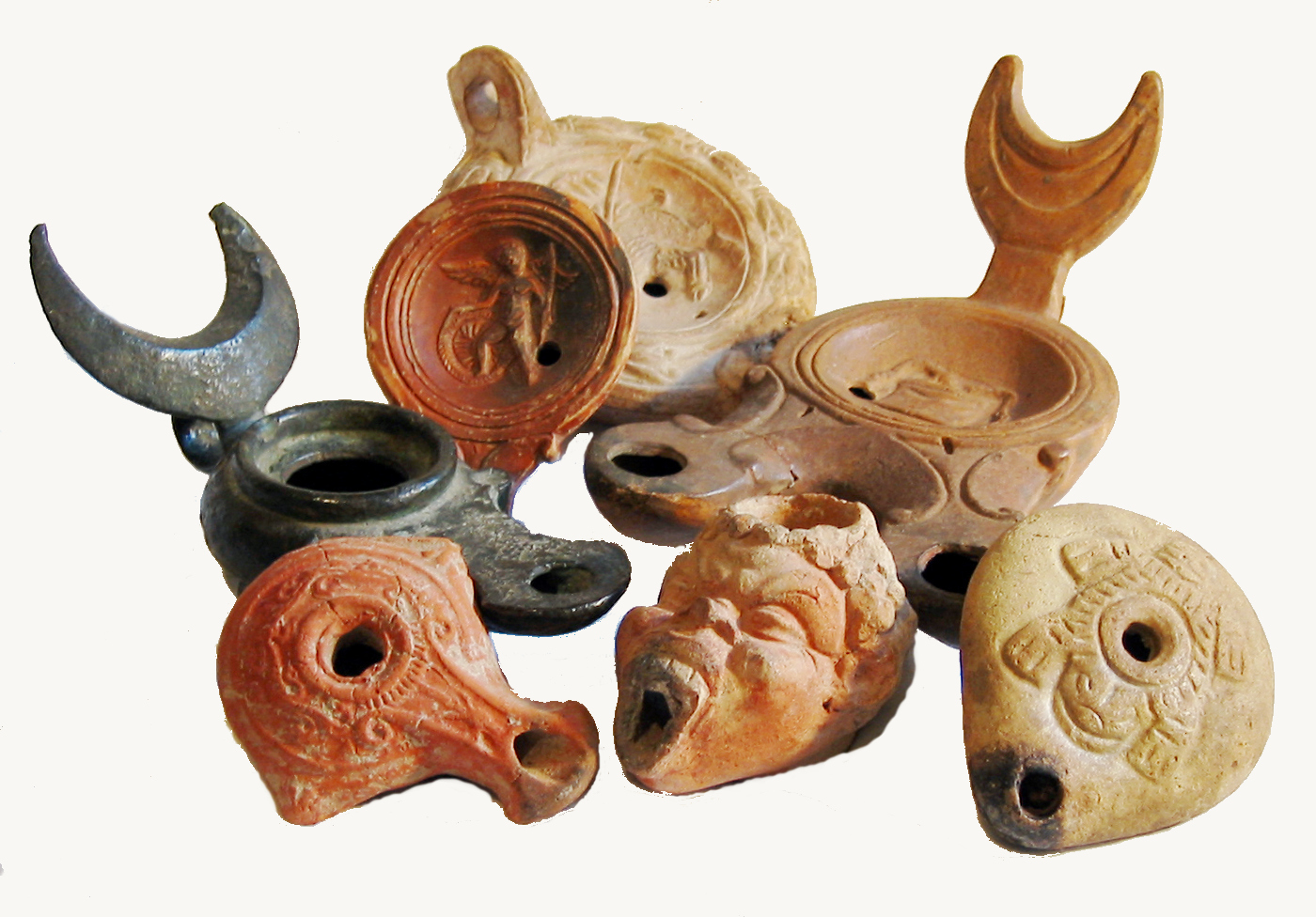
Group of ancient Hellenistic lamps.

=== Findings ===
The Tell Deir Situn mound was roughly 72 m by 100 m. Seventeen 4 m square trenches were dug, revealing large stone wall-footings of a substantial building on the west side of the mound. The buildings were preserved up to a maximum height of six stone courses. The building's dimensions were 17.70 by 5.55 meters, and it had some buttresses on the outside faces in addition to projecting walls on two of its sides. There were found to be two building phases were found, the earlier of which had mostly disappeared. Although the building's purpose is unclear, it may have served as a "police-post" or something similar.

A copious amount of pottery was found within the building. It featured shapes painted in red or black as well as fish plates and bowls that are typical of the Hellenistic era. A variety of floral motifs were stamped on a portion of the sherds. The collection of Hellenistic ceramics, included a fishplate, a bowl with in-turned rim, a bowl with out-turned rim, a plate with the rolled rim, jars, stamped sherds, and pipe lamps, have been found at the site. A 'fish-tail' pottery lamp, a collection of oval-stamped terracotta loomweights, and a terracotta figure depicting a man with a cloak draped over his shoulder and a belted tunic are among the other discoveries.

The finding of a coin connected to the most recent phase of the building confirmed the Hellenistic date of the site. The coin dates to the Seleucid ruler Alexander Balas's rule (150–145 B.C.). Minted in Antioch, the reverse shows an Apollo with a bow and arrow.

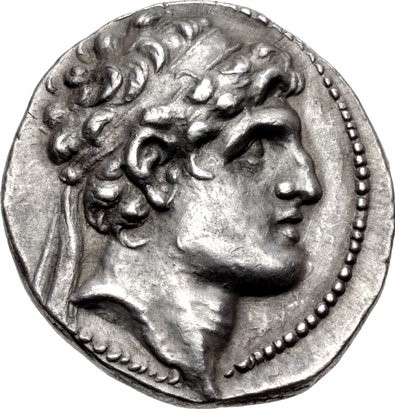
Alexander I Balas coin minted at Antioch

There was no indication of Assyrian habitation at either site, although in Tell Deir Situn, a piece of a bronze fibula shaped like a lady with her hands clasped beneath her bust was found on the ground. Due to this finding made in the fall of 1985, John Curtis states it is evident that this fibula is Assyrian from the 7th century BCE despite its differences from other fibulae that have been found.

== Tell Mohammed ‘Arab ==
Tell Mohammed ‘Arab lies on the Tigris river in northern Iraq and roughly half the site has been eroded by it, forming a cliff. It ran about 180 meters along the river and about 80 meters inland to the south before being inundated due to dam construction. The site was excavated as part of the Eski Mosul Dam Salvage Project by a team from the British Archaeological Expedition directed by Michael Roaf under the auspices of the British Institute for the Study of Iraq. Work began in November 1982 and ended when the site was inundated in April 1985. The site was occupied in the Late Uruk period (c. 3500-3000 BC), painted Ninevite 5 period (c. 3000-2750 BC), incised Ninevite 5 period (c. 2750-2500 BC), and Middle Assyrian period (c. 1350-1150 BC). A few stray Hellenistic remains, mainly storage pits, were noted and a Sassanian period cemetery. Excavation finds on the Late Uruk level included beveled rim bowls, diagnostic pottery for the Uruk Culture. On the Middle Assyrian period level a fragmentary cuneiform tablet was found as well as 7 cylinder seals (and 2 clay sealings) among the buildings. A single Neo Assyrian period seal was found in a Hellenistic period rubbish pit. Other sites excavated during this dam rescue effort included Tell Deir Situn, Tell Rijim, Tell Fisna, Tell Jikan, Tell Karrana 3, and Tell Raffaan.

== Sources ==
- Iraq (1987). "Excavations in Iraq 1985-86". Iraq. 49: 231–251. doi:10.1017/S0021088900006653. S2CID 249895688.
- Curtis, John E. (1988). "Assyria as a bronzeworking centre in the Late Assyrian period". In Curtis, John (ed.). Bronzeworking Centres of Western Asia c. 1000 - 539 B.C. Routledge. pp. 83–96.
- Curtis, John (1992). "Recent British Museum Excavations in Assyria". Journal of the Royal Asiatic Society. Third Series. 2 (2): 147–165. doi:10.1017/S1356186300002340. JSTOR 25182504. S2CID 162496063.
- Curtis, John (2000). "Introduction". In Curtis, John (ed.). Mesopotamia and Iran in the Parthian and Sasanian Periods: Rejection and Revival c. 238 BC-AD 642. British Museum Press. pp. 11–16.
- McKenzie, Leah (1994). "Patterns in Seleucid Administration: Macedonian or Near Eastern?". Mediterranean Archaeology. 7: 61–68. JSTOR 24667802.
