= Tell Rad Shaqrah =

Tell Rad Shaqra
- Tell Rad Shaqrah
- Location within Syria Location within Near East
- 36°28′04″N 40°49′57″E
- Type: tell
- Location: Hasakah Governorate, Syria
- Region: Upper Mesopotamia

Site notes
- Excavation dates: 1991-1995
- Archaeologists: Piotr Bieliński

Tell Rad Shaqrah (Tell Rad Shaqra, Tell Rad Shaqurah) was a fortified rural settlement in Syria, in ancient Upper Mesopotamia. It is located on the northern bank of the Khabur River, about 15 kilometers from Hassake (Al-Hasaka).

== Archaeological research ==
Tell Rad Shaqrah covers an area of about 1 hectare and rises to 6 meters above the plain. The site was excavated in 1991–1995 as part of the Western Hassake Dam Project, an international salvage project organized by the Syrian Directorate-General of Antiquities and Museums. The expedition from the Polish Centre of Mediterranean Archaeology University of Warsaw was directed by Piotr Bieliński. Earlier in the framework of the same project, Polish archaeologists conducted research at the sites of Tell Djassa and Tell Abu Hafur.

The tell measures 140 by 120 meters and is 8 meters high. Nine settlement layers were identified during the excavations. The oldest remains date to the Halaf period; the settlement expanded in the Early Dynastic III period (mid-3rd millennium BC); the youngest phases date to the Neo-Assyrian period. The settlement was encircled by a 4-meter-thick wall built of mud-brick, with thick (more than 6 meters) buttresses faced with basalt blocks. This type of fortification is called glacis. Thirty-four graves of children and adults, as well as infants, were uncovered. They included pit graves, graves in stone setting, and infant burials in kitchen vessels. The child burials yielded the richest and most diverse grave furnishings, consisting of vessels as well as jewelry made of bronze, stone, shells, and other materials. The finds included zoomorphic beads and pendants. Finds also included 19 Third-millennium BC clay figurines (9 anthropomorphic and 10 zoomorphic).
