= Research Centre in Cairo, Polish Centre of Mediterranean Archaeology University of Warsaw =

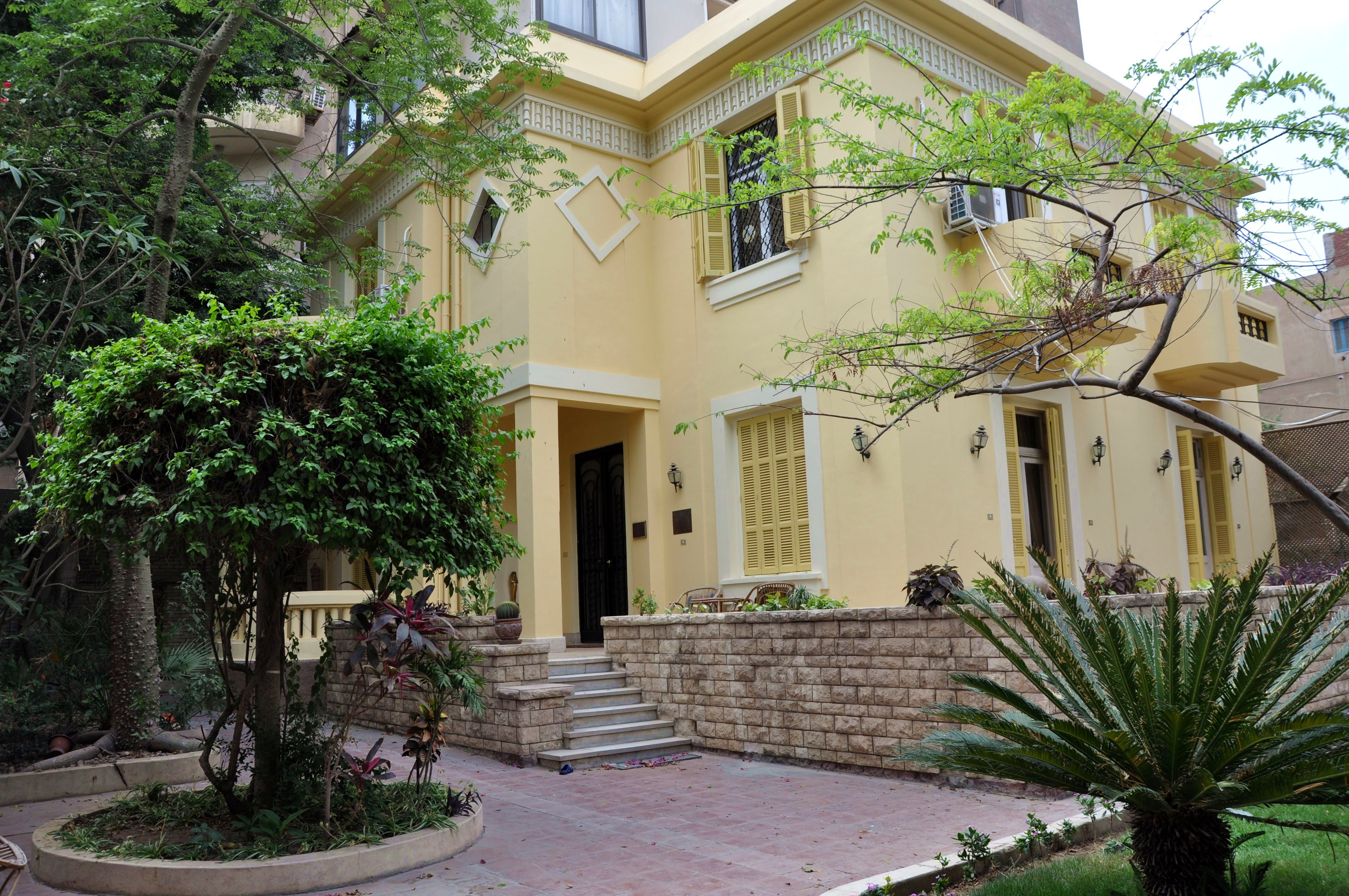
- Founder: Kazimierz Michałowski
- Established: 1959
- President: Anna Wodzińska
- Location: 11, Mahalla Street, Cairo, Egypt
- Website: pcma.uw.edu.pl/en/

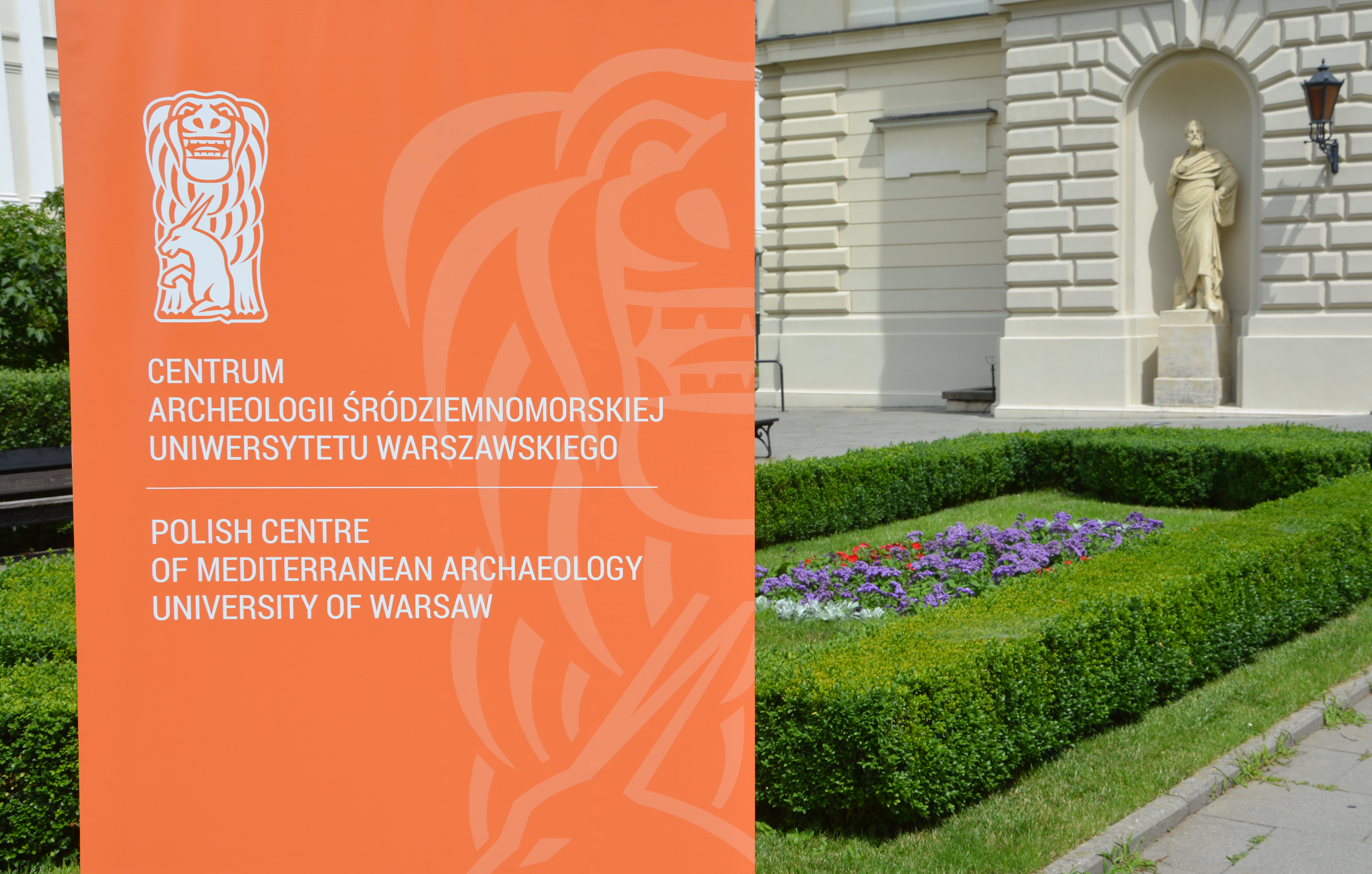
The logo of the Polish Centre of Mediterranean Archaeology of the University of Warsaw now features the lion from a relief discovered by the Centre’s mission in Palmyra.

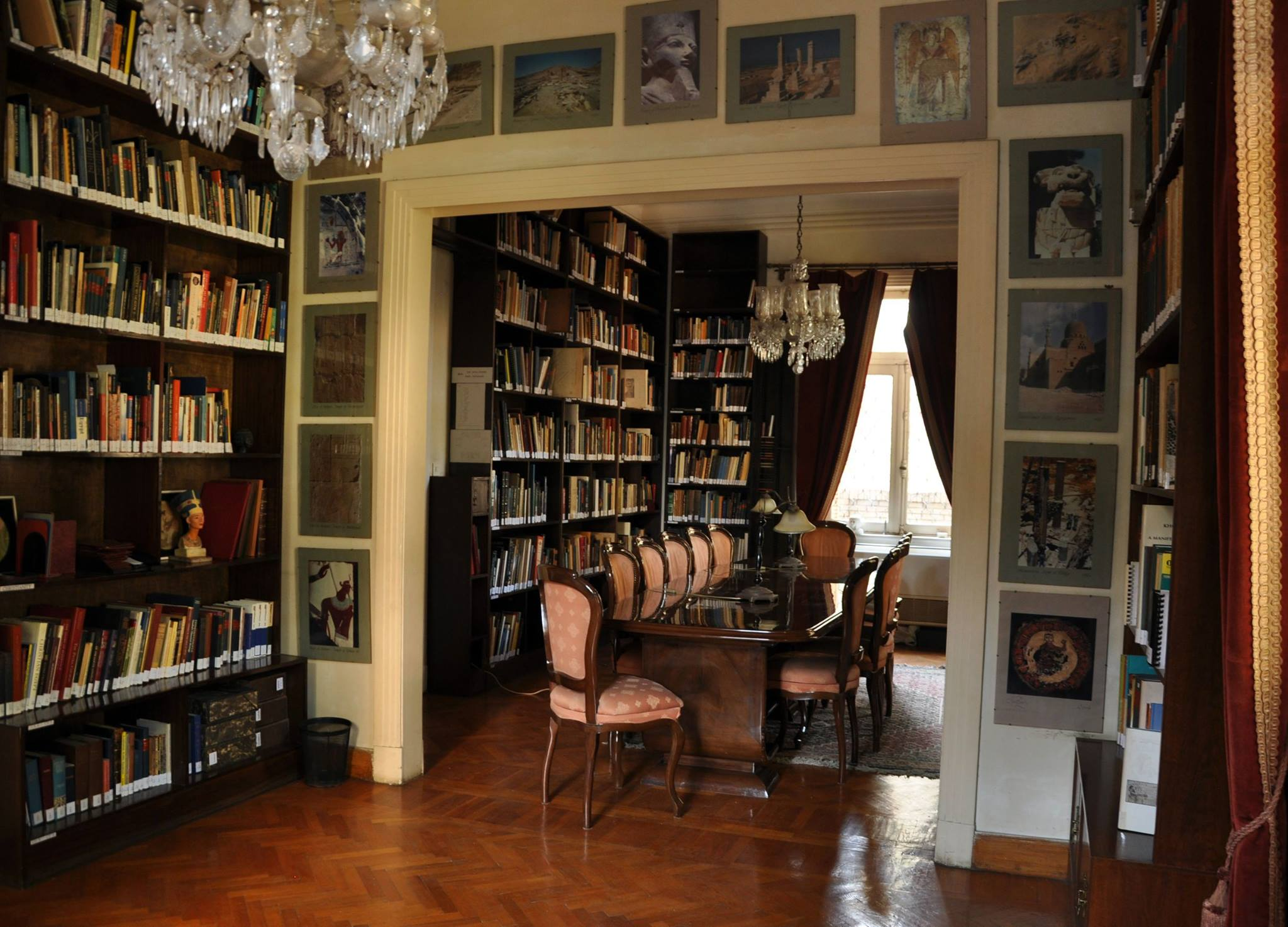
The reference library of the institute in Cairo

The Research Centre in Cairo, Polish Centre of Mediterranean Archaeology University of Warsaw, (Polish: Stacja Badawcza Centrum Archeologii Śródziemnomorskiej Uniwersytetu Warszawskiego w Kairze, Arabic: مركز البحوث بالقاهرة، المركز البولندي لآثار منطقة البحر الأبيض المتوسط جامعة وارسو, romanized: Markaz al-Bohouth bi Al-Qahira, Al-Markaz al-Bulandi lil-Athar Mintaqat al-Bahr al-Abyad al-Mutawassit Jami’at Warsu) is the only Polish scientific research institution in Africa and the Middle East, where it has operated since 1959 in Cairo. The mission of the Research Centre is to develop and expand Polish research in the region, particularly in the Nile Valley. It is operated by the Polish Centre of Mediterranean Archaeology, an independent research institute of the University of Warsaw. The PCMA Cairo Research Centre is located in two buildings situated in close proximity to one another in the Cairo Heliopolis district—in antiquity the centre of a religious cult and the location of the Egypt's reputedly largest temple.

== History ==
Polish archaeologists first started to work in Egypt during the times of the Second Polish Republic (1918–1939). Kazimierz Michałowski, the founder of the Polish school of Mediterranean archaeology, initiated Polish research in Egypt, and joined as a field director a project of the French Institute for Oriental Archaeology in Cairo (IFAO) at Edfu. The excavation was suspended after three seasons because of the outbreak of WWII. Twenty years later, despite the tense political situation in the Middle East, Polish archaeologists were back in Egypt. In 1956, they were granted a concession to explore Tell Atrib in the suburbs of Benha, but work did not begin until a year later due to the Suez Crisis.

In 1959 Professor Michałowski established the Polish Centre of Mediterranean Archaeology of the University of Warsaw in Cairo, which is still operated today under the name Research Center in Cairo. Polish archaeologists facing new archaeological tasks, such as coordination of new research, preparing for publication the results of the excavations, contributing to the international UNESCO campaign to save Nubian archaeological heritage, greatly benefitted from having a permanent location in Egypt

In 1960 Polish archaeologists began excavations in Alexandria. In 1961–1964, led by Michałowski, they became an important part of the UNESCO campaign to save the archaeological heritage of Nubia, which was to be inundated by the waters of the newly created artificial Lake Nasser. "Poles hit the Nubian lottery jackpot", reported the international press about the Polish discoveries at Faras. Even as the first season of excavation at Faras was in full swing, Michałowski was approached by the Egyptian authorities to take on the task of completing the restoration of the Upper Terrace of the Temple of Hatshepsut in Luxor. The work in Deir el-Bahari began in 1961. In 1963, Michałowski headed the international committee of experts created by the Egyptian government to rescue the rock temples of Abu Simbel.

The Polish Centre in Cairo was named after its founder by the Senate of the University of Warsaw on 21 December 1983. Its establishment and development into a reputed international archaeological institution is considered among his greatest achievements. After all, "the current level of culture in any country is measured by whether it runs its own excavations in Egypt," Michałowski used to say.

The 1980s saw a rapid development of archaeological research with the opening of new sites in Egypt as well as in other countries of the Middle East. This resulted in an administrative reorganization in 1986. The head office was moved to Warsaw, establishing the Polish Centre of Mediterranean Archaeology of the University of Warsaw in Warsaw in charge of supervising the Research Centre in Cairo as its main branch, as well as all the Polish archaeological expeditions in the Eastern Mediterranean, the Near East and Northeastern Africa.

In 2017, there was a dozen or so Polish archaeological expeditions working in Egypt. Every year several hundred Polish researchers of different specialties, not only archaeologists, from different Polish and foreign scientific institutions participate in research in Egypt.

== Objectives ==
The objectives of the Research Centre in Cairo are as follows:

- to ensure the efficient progress of archaeological and restoration work carried out by Polish expeditions in Egypt;
- to represent Polish researchers, archaeologists and conservators, to the Egyptian authorities responsible for antiquities, most of all the Ministry of Antiquities, as well as to other archaeological units in Egypt;
- to develop and popularize knowledge, by organizing public lectures and seminars presenting archaeological research in Egypt and Polish achievements in this field, as well as running a reference library allowing the Centre's residents and visitors to access to publications on archaeology and history of the Middle East;
- to provide support for a scholarship program of the Ministry of Science and Higher Education of the Republic of Poland, granted to students, graduates and PhD candidates.

== Directors of the Research Centre in Cairo ==
Prior to the establishment of the Polish Centre in Warsaw, the Polish Centre in Cairo was headed by:

- Kazimierz Michałowski (1959–1981)
- Zofia Sztetyłło (Acting Director, 1981)
- Waldemar Chmielewski (1982)
- Wiktor Andrzej Daszewski (1982–1991)
- Michał Gawlikowski (1991–2005)

Since 2005 the Research Center in Cairo has its own Director, subordinated to the Director of the Polish Centre in Warsaw. This office has been held by:

- Zbigniew E. Szafrański (2005–2015)
- Artur Obłuski (2015–2020)
- Anna Wodzińska (2020–)

== Polish archaeological expeditions in Egypt ==
- Polish-Egyptian Archaeological and Conservation Mission at Kom el-Dikka in Alexandria, since 1960. One of the main quarters of the ancient city located in the center of the modern town is among the greatest discoveries of Polish archaeologists in Egypt. Preserving non-stop occupation from the city's founding in the 3rd century BC through the medieval 13th–14th-century Islamic burial ground, the site that is visited today as an archaeological park open to tourists encompasses buildings from the 4th through 6th centuries AD, including the oldest known ruins of an institution of higher learning (Alexandria's ancient academy) composed of lecture halls, an assembly hall vel theater or rather odeon, a late Roman imperial bathhouse and a habitation quarter of houses and workshops. Kom el-Dikka is the largest and the most important archaeological site in Alexandria. It was discovered by chance when a high-rise construction project turned up wall remains identified by Polish archaeologists called in to consult the finds, as Egypt's only surviving Roman-age theater.
- Polish Archaeological Mission at Marina el-Alamein, excavating an ancient Graeco-Roman town and necropolis since 1987. Following three decades of research and conservation, the urban plan has been established and archaeologists have uncovered the main city square, lined with colonnaded stoas, districts of private houses with rich painted and sculpted decoration and an extensive necropolis of underground hypogea with many chambers as well as masonry tombs decorated with tall pillars. A number of streets and shops, as well as a 5th century Christian church were also discovered and documented.
- Marea Archaeological Project, research since 2000. The team has explored a bath from the 6th century AD supplied with water from a well operated by a saqiya (wheel device moved by animal power). Since 2003 archaeologists have been excavating a Byzantine basilica, the second largest in Egypt, after the one in Abu Mena.^{[17]} The structures date from the heyday of the town when it was a major stop on the pilgrimage route to the nearby Abu Mena. One of the shops on the street along the eastern facade of the basilica yielded a hoard of several hundred bronze coins.
- Polish-Slovak Archaeological Mission at Tell el-Retaba, studying a fortress of the Ramesside period (New Kingdom, 13th–11th centuries BC) since 2007. The site is identified as the fortress of Pithom mentioned in the Bible. Among the discoveries is the only known stable for horses from the Third Intermediate Period and an army barracks structure.
- Polish Archaeological Expedition to the Eastern Nile Delta – Tell el-Farkha, working since 1998. The site is a settlement on three mounds, located on a major trade route passing through the Nile Delta to the Mediterranean coast and Syria. Its peak development can be dated to the Nagada period. Of highest significance among the discoveries are two golden statues of presumed rulers from the pre-Dynastic period, indicating that the site was a power center of some substance in this part of Egypt, before its decline about the time of the unification of Upper and Lower Egypt, resulting from changing trade routes and the increased importance of water transport.
- Polish-Egyptian Archaeological Mission at Saqqara, opened in 1987, working regularly since 1997, in a sector of the necropolis located to the west of the oldest pyramid in the world, the step-pyramid of Djoser, built around 2650 BC. Polish archaeologists proved that the site was not an ancient dump, although the tombs discovered there were located in and ancient stone quarry from the Third Dynasty. The lavishly decorated tombs (preserving the ancient polychromed reliefs in excellent condition) belonged to high-ranking nobles from the Sixth Dynasty, such as the vizier Merefnebef (discovered in 1997) and the admiral Nyankhnefertem, priest and trusted secretary of the pharaoh (discovered in 2003).
- Polish Archaeological Mission at Naqlun (Deir el-Malak) in Fayum Oasis, research since 1986 in a monastic complex established in the 5th century and still functional today. The site comprises scattered hermitages, a central compound of extended monastic buildings, church, refuse dump and two cemeteries, one from the 6th and the other a large medieval Christian cemetery of the 12th–13th century. Finds include pottery, burial textiles, basketry and many others. The written documents: letters, codices, literary texts, psalms and fragments of Gospels, in Coptic, Greek, Arabic and Latin, are evidence of monastic continuity and the level of the monks’ education.
- Polish–Egyptian Archaeological and Conservation Mission at the Temple of Hatshepsut at Deir el-Bahari, operating since 1961. The main task of the expedition is the restoration of the Upper Terrace of this magnificent temple of the New Kingdom Pharaoh-Queen.
- Polish Archaeological Mission at Sheikh Abd al-Gurna (“Hermitage Mission”), established in 2003 to study the 6th–8th century AD Coptic hermitage installed in two Middle Kingdom nobles' tombs in Western Thebes. Recently, the expedition has started to investigate the underground parts of the tombs. One of the most interesting finds are fragments of linen with ink-painted hieroglyphs, a gift of Ptolemy XII, the father of Cleopatra, for the nearby temple at Deir el-Medina.
- The Berenike Project (Polish–American Mission in Berenike and the Eastern Desert), excavations since 2008 in the Hellenistic and Roman ruins of the Red Sea port. The port was built in the 3rd century BC, a prime purpose being the import of elephants from eastern Africa for the needs of the Ptolemaic armies. The harbor was an important stop on the major Greek and Roman trade routes to India, from where spices and precious stones were brought, and probably China, from where silk was imported. Incense and myrrh were brought from Arabia. The goods were transported by land from the port to Coptos on the Nile (modern Qift), and then by water to the Nile Delta and further to Rome. A cemetery of animals (cats, dogs, monkeys) is being excavated on the outskirts of the harbor.
- Rock Petroglyph Unit, part of the Dakhleh Oasis Project, surveying and documenting the largest gallery of rock art in the eastern Sahara since 1985. Some of the finest carvings show giraffes, oryxes and bulls, most common representations include sandals and feet impressions). The oldest petroglyphs have been dated to 8000–3000 BC.
- Conservation Project in the Emir Kabir Qurqumas Complex in Cairo, in 1972–2000. The impressive complex erected by Qurqumas in the first decade of the 16th century was not only a burial monument to the owner, but part of his religious foundation (the so-called waqf); it also included a Quranic school, Sufi convent and the residential rooms of the emir.
