= Me-Turan =

- Me-Turnat
- Location within Iraq Location within Near East
- 34°12′52″N 45°05′05″E
- Type: ancient city
- Periods: Isin-Larsa, Old Babylonian, Kassite, Neo-Assyrian
- Location: Diyala Governorate, Iraq
- Region: Mesopotamia

Site notes
- Height: 6 m (20 ft)
- Excavation dates: 1978 - 1984
- Archaeologists: Na'il Hannoun and Burhan Shakir
- Condition: ruined - inundated

Me-Turan (also Mê-Turan) is an archaeological site in Diyala Governorate Iraq comprising the modern Tell Haddad and the two mounds of Tell al-Sib (also Tell as-Sib). In Neo-Assyrian times it was known as Me-Turnat. It was excavated as part of the Hamrin Dam salvage project.

== History ==
The city of Me-Turan was occupied in the Isin-Larsa period (Level 4), Old Babylonian period (level 2 and 3), Kassite period, and Neo-Assyrian period (level 1). Founded early in the 2nd millennium BC during the Isin-Larsa times it was controlled by Eshnunna through the reign of several of that cities kings. With the rise of Babylon Me-Turan came under the control of that city. After the end of the Old Bablyonian period the city lay fallow until Neo-Assyrian times, excepting some Kassite era residencial housing. At the surface were nine Parthian kilns.

== Archaeology ==
Tell Haddad is a 6 meter high tell and the largest site in the area after Tell Baradan which it lies 350 meters east of. The two nearby mounds of Tell al-Sib are smaller. Together they formed the ancient city. Excavation at Tell al-Sib began in 1978 when a number of tablets and a gaming board were found. The full site was excavated by Na'il Hannoun and Burhan Shakir beginning in 1979. Work ended in 1984 when the site was flooded. In total around 1000 cuneiform tablets were recovered with 745 being from Tell al-Sib. At the lowest layer, above virgin soil, a jar was found with 34 tablets containing year names of three kings of Eshnunna, from before the area was conquered by Babylon.

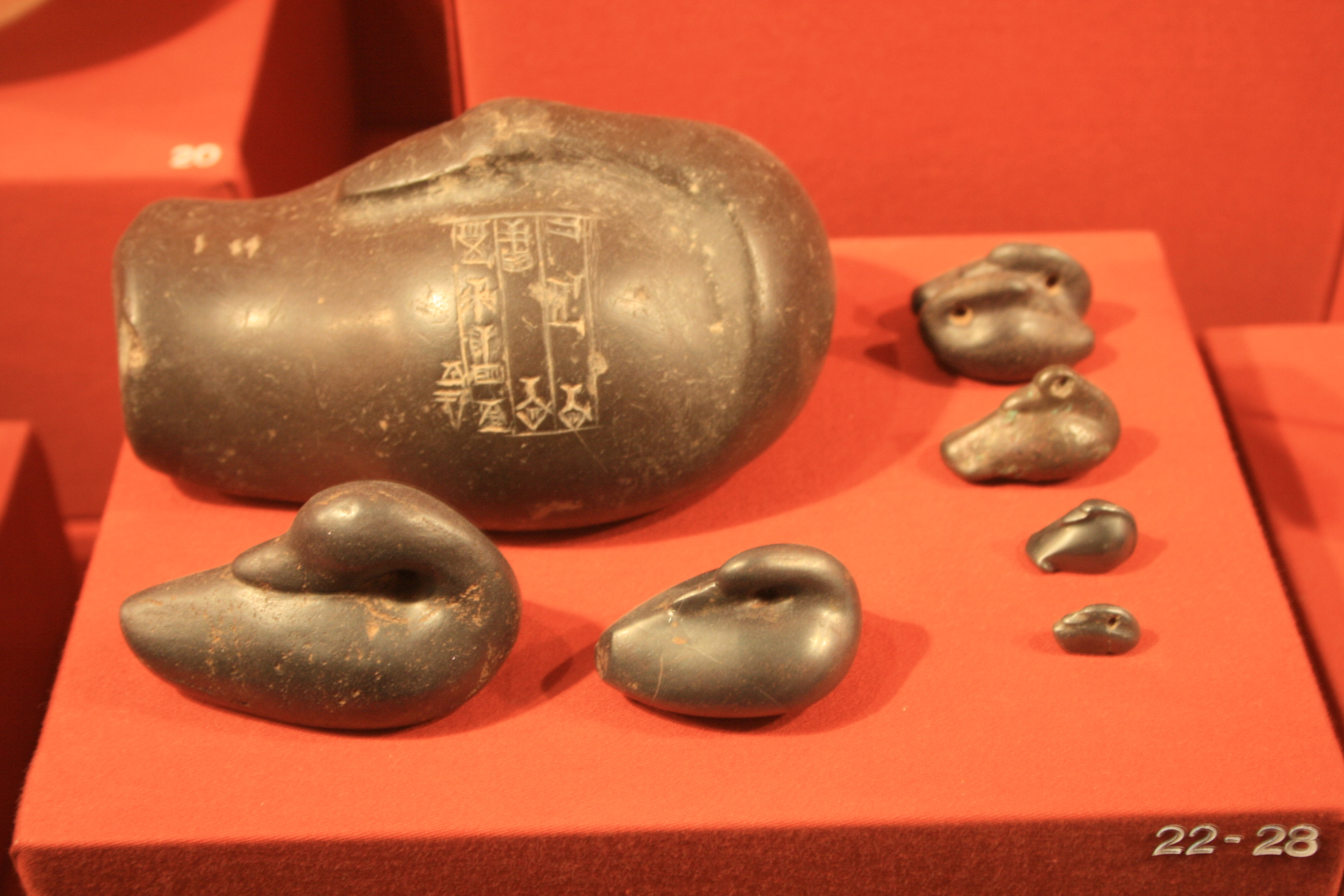
Duck shaped weights in the typical mesopotamian fashion, made from Bronze, Hematite or Magnetite)

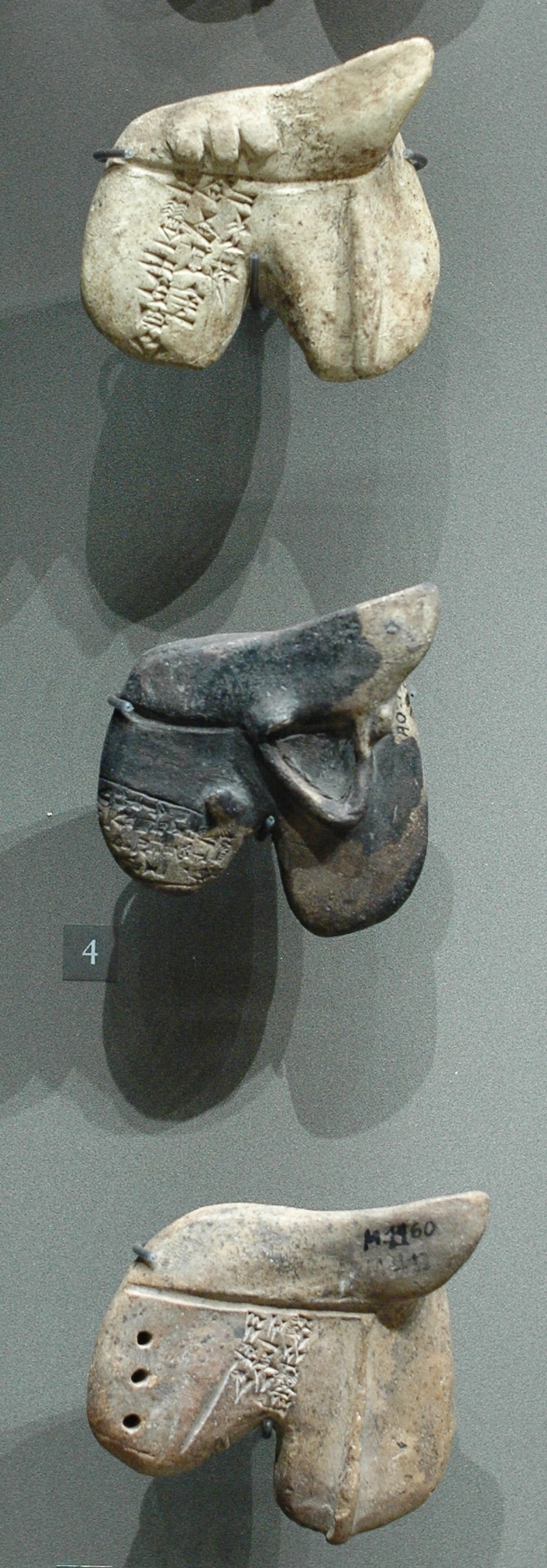
Akkadian language clay sheep liver models written in a local dialect, recovered from the palace at Mari, dated to the 19th or 18th century BC. Artefacts similar to this was found in Me-Turan

In Old Babylonian times the city was surrounded by a four meter wide city wall with towers. Finds from the Old Babylonian period include a duck weight, two extispicy liver models, and large number of cuneiform tablets and fragments. A number are in Akkadian, mostly of economic content but including medical, mathematical, and incantation texts. One of the mathematical tablets (IM 95771) includes a problem about a trapezoidal water reservoir divided into five sections of equal length. The remainder are written in Sumerian and include literary texts such as Gilgamesh and the Bull of Heaven as well as a new fragment of the Laws of Eshnunna. Kassite period housing was excavated. A Neo-Assyrian temple dating to the reign of Ashurbanipal, E-šahulla dedicated to Nergal was found. The temple dimensions are 80 meters by 47 meters and it was destroyed by fire. An inscription of Sargon II was also found.

== See also ==
- Cities of the ancient Near East
- Tell Yelkhi
- Tell Suleimah
