= Musab bin Umair mosque massacre =

Massacre of Sunni Iraqis by a Shi'a paramilitary

Coordinates: 33.9378°N 45.1347°E

2014 Musab bin Umair mosque massacre
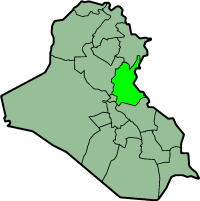
- Diyala province
- Location: Imam Wais, Diyala, Iraq
- Date: 22 August 2014; 12:15 (AST)
- Target: Sunni Muslims
- Weapons: PK machine guns; AK-47s
- Deaths: 73
- Injuries: Dozens wounded
- Victim: Sunni Muslim civilians
- Perpetrator: Asa'ib Ahl al-Haq

On 22 August 2014, Shia militants killed at least 73 people in an attack on the Sunni Musab bin Omair mosque in the Imam Wais village (north-east of Baghdad and south of the city of Baquba) of Diyala Province, Iraq. The attack occurred during Jumu'ah (Friday prayers) and at the time of the attack, there were about 150 worshippers at the mosque. The attack took place during the Northern Iraq offensive by the Islamic State (IS) against the Iraqi government. The attack was blamed on Shiite militias fighting alongside the Iraqi army against IS.

== The attack ==
An Iraqi army major general said "the attackers arrived in two pick-up trucks after two bombs had gone off at the house of a local Shi'ite militia leader, Abdul Samad Salar Al-Zarkoshi, killing three of his men." Although an initial report quoted security forces blaming IS, local police were later reported as saying that a preliminary investigation had confirmed that al-Zarkoshi's militia was responsible for the attack. Security officials said "masked gunmen stormed into the mosque and fired on worshippers with automatic weapons before escaping on motorcycles." Another security official said "a group of insurgents was waiting outside the mosque in [unmarked] cars and opened fire when the Sunnis left the main gate of the mosque," adding that "the area around the mosque is still surrounded by the militants and snipers."

Lawmaker Nahida al-Dayani, a Sunni originally from the village, said "sectarian militias entered and opened fire at worshippers. Most mosques have no security. Some of the victims were from one family. Some women who rushed to see the fate of their relatives at the mosque were killed."

A resident of Diyala said, "73 people had been killed at the mosque, making it the deadliest attack against Sunni civilians in Iraq in months." According to an eyewitness, the casualties included the local Imam (the first targeted victim, according to witnesses), and women and children who were killed as they tried to save relatives from the gunfire.

When Iraqi security forces arrived at the scene, supported by Shi'ite militias, they triggered bombs that had been planted by the attackers to cover their escape. Four militiamen were killed by the blasts and 13 wounded.

== Aftermath ==
As a result of the attack, Sunni politicians Saleh al-Mutlaq and Salim al-Jabouri suspended their participation in talks with the main Shi'ite political alliance to form a new government. Mutlaq said the Shiite militias were "even worse than the terrorists [i.e. IS] sometimes," because the militias "are protected by the government." Another Sunni lawmaker, Talal al-Zouba’i, said "Iraqi security forces did nothing to stop the massacre and had barred rescue teams attempting to reach the mosque;" adding, "These Shiite militias are massing across the country and killing people based on their identity. What's happening will create a volcano that once it explodes, no one will be able to stop."

The attack was widely condemned across Iraq and internationally. The new designated Iraqi prime minister, Haider al-Abadi, demanded the police to investigate the crime scene as fast as they can and let nothing like this ever happen again. His coalition, the National Iraqi Alliance, "condemned the massacre regardless of who is behind it" but coalition members criticised the suspension of talks, saying this "is not the answer but rather serves the perpetrators of the massacre". The newly appointed Sunni Arab speaker of the parliament, Salim al-Jabouri, called for political unity and emphasised that "all the political entities condemned the crime". Other Shi'ite militias condemned the attack, with the Asaib Ahl al-Haq describing it as "barbaric" and "a crime that we cannot turn a blind eye to."

UN Secretary-General Ban Ki-moon condemned the attack "in the strongest terms", saying attacks on places of worship are "completely unacceptable" and prohibited under international law. The United States condemned the "absurd and repulsive attack" saying all Iraqi leaders should defend Iraq. The European Union described it as a "heinous crime" but said it should not stand in the way of government formation.

On 25 August, Sunni militants claimed to have killed four al-Zarkoshi tribesmen who they claimed had taken part in the massacre, ambushing them in Hamrin.

On 26 August, the governor of Diyala Governorate, Amir al-Mujammai, announced that the Iraqi police arrested three brothers from the al-Zarkoshi tribe, suspected of the massacre. Munir Mizhar Sultan, Salim Mizhar Sultan and Saddam Mizhar Sultan were arrested in Hamrin, 55 km north-east of Baqubah. These three are brothers of Abdul Samad Salar Al-Zarkoshi, the militia leader, who, it was reported, may have escaped to Iran.

On 2 November, the Human Rights Watch stated that the Shi'ite militia of Asa'ib Ahl al-Haq committed the massacre, killing 73 worshipers. Some witnesses stated to the HRW that when they arrived to the mosque, they saw 8 men, some of them were wearing plain clothes and others wore police uniforms. They also stated that they saw an armed man wearing a green head band with "Asa'ib Ahl al-Haq" written on it. At first, the witnesses saw around 10 killed and 30 injured in the mosque. They dragged the injured people to the garden of the mosque, only to see 20-30 armed men marching up to the mosque while firing their guns, finishing off the rest of the injured people. The witnesses told the HRW that all of the 73 killed worshipers were from the same tribe, Bani Wais tribe. They also told them that the guns that were used in the massacre were PK machine guns and AK-47s.

== See also ==
- Northern Iraq offensive (August 2014)
- 2014 American intervention in Iraq
- Barwana massacre
