= Qumayrah Valley =

Valley in northern Oman

Qumayrah Valley – a valley in northern Oman, in the Al-Hajar Mountains in the Ad Dhahirah Governorate. It stretches for about 10 kilometers between the villages of Ayn Bani Sa’dah (al-Ayn), Qumayrah and Bilt.

== Archaeology ==
In 2015, the Omani-Polish Qumayrah Archaeological Project was created as a result of the cooperation between the Polish Centre of Mediterranean Archaeology University of Warsaw and the Ministry of National Heritage and Culture of the Sultanate of Oman. It is directed by Prof. Piotr Bieliński from the PCMA UW.

The valley was surveyed in the late 1990s, but had never been closely investigated by archaeologists before, so the project started with an archaeological reconnaissance. Several dozen sites of different types and periods (from the Stone Age to the Islamic period) were documented. Then the area of excavations was marked out. Since 2016, the research focuses on three sites: a burial site from the Early Bronze Age (QA 1), a Neolithic campsite (QA 2), and a settlement from the Iron and Bronze Ages (QA 3).

=== Site QA 1 – burials ===
Site QA 1 is a burial site with graves in a stone setting, dating to the Umm an-Nar period (2700/2600–2000 BC). It was identified in 1998 by Paolo M. Costa, but it was first excavated by the Omani-Polish expedition in 2016. The site encompasses 10 circular graves with diameters ranging from 6 to 11 m. Most of them are located near a modern cemetery and cover an area of approximately 0.4 ha; only one structure lies about 450 m away, near a wadi.

=== Site QA 2 – Neolithic settlement ===
Site QA 2 is approximately 0.3 ha big. The identified phases of (probably seasonal) settlement date from the Early to the Late Neolithic. Hearths and traces of houses were discovered in test trenches. Research in 2016–2017 yielded several shell adornments and 2585 stone artifacts, including 576 retouched tools. They were made predominantly of local raw materials: flint, chert and radiolarite.

=== Site QA 3 – Bronze and Iron Ages settlement ===
QA 3 is the largest of the excavated sites, located near a modern village. A settlement existed here in the Bronze and Iron Ages, and late Islamic layers were also identified. Archaeologists uncovered houses from all the above-mentioned periods as well as a circular tower dated to the Bronze Age. Two other stone towers and further remains of the settlement were discovered south of the site. The layers dated to Iron Age II were also attested at sites QA 20 and QA 21, and seem to belong to a single settlement.
