= Tell Abada =

- Location within Iraq
- 34°06′N 45°07′E
- Type: tell
- Periods: Ubaid period
- Location: Iraq
- Region: Diyala Governorate

Site notes
- Height: 3.5 metre
- Length: 190 metre
- Width: 150 metre
- Excavation dates: 1977–1978
- Archaeologists: Sabah Abboud Jasim

Tell Abada is a tell, or archaeological settlement mound, in Diyala Governorate (Iraq). Abada was excavated as part of the archaeological salvage operation to excavate sites that would be flooded by the reservoir of the Hamrin Dam. Excavations revealed occupation levels dating to the Ubaid 1-3 periods. The site is important because it was one of the few where an Ubaid period settlement could be excavated in its entirety. It was excavated between December 1977 and July 1978 under the direction of Sabah Abboud Jasim, revealing three occupation levels dating to the 5th millennium BC.

== The site and its environment ==
The site lies in the foothills of the Zagros Mountains in the Hamrin region, east of the Diyala River and 12 km (7.5 mi) southeast of Sadiyah. It measures 190 by 150 m and rises 3.5 m above the surrounding plain. Another nearby Ubaid period site is Tell Rashid, which is located 12 km (7.5 mi) north of Tell Abada.

== History of research ==
Tell Abada was excavated for a single season from December 1977 until July 1978 under the direction of Sabah Abboud Jasim. The excavation was part of a large archaeological salvage operation to excavate sites in danger of being flooded by the reservoir of the Hemrin Dam, which was being constructed at the time. Some 80% of the site has been excavated and virgin soil (undisturbed by human activity) was reached in two locations. The fact that Tell Abada was excavated almost in its entirety makes it an important site in the study of the Ubaid period.

About ninety Proto-Literate clay tokens were found at the site, mainly in Building A (Levels I and II). Some of the tokens were in groups. As an example, in Building A Level I sixteen tokens were found in an "unpainted, carinated bowl of Hajji Muhammad type". The group consisted of "8 spheres, 4 cones, 2 discs, 1 rod, 1 plain 'tablet'".

== Occupation history ==
Three different 5th millennium BC occupation levels were recognised, dating to a transitional phase between the Samarra and Ubaid periods (level III), after a gap late Ubaid 2 (level II), and early Ubaid 3 (level I).

The architectural remains of level III consisted of two houses with multiple rectangular rooms, with gypsum plastered walls. These buildings have been interpreted as a pottery production location based on the presence of large storage jars, red ochre and three nearby kilns. The kilns were located in an open area and were of different types and shapes. In one case, it has been suggested that it could have been used both for firing pottery as well as food production. Large quantities of painted Samarra and Ubaid 1 were recovered with a wide array of different decorative geometric motifs, including ceramics with both Samarra and Ubaid 1 characteristics. There seems to have been a clear break in the occupation history between levels III and II.

Level II consisted of 11 buildings which were separated by streets and narrow lanes. The buildings share a distinct design with a tripartite plan with rooms arranged around a T-shaped courtyard. The walls were constructed of mudbricks. One of the largest buildings (building A), in the center of the site, had exterior walls decorated with buttresses, indicating that it may have had a special function. A large number of infant burials were found there. Designs on the painted pottery included geometric motifs as well as more naturalistic depictions. Pottery decorated with incisions and impressions was also common. Other finds included animal and human clay figurines, stone tools such as querns, mortars, mace heads, and bone tools such as needles and spatulas.

A certain degree of continuation existed between the architecture of level II and level I. Painted pottery was common and often wheel-thrown, and decorations shared characteristics with those observed on both Northern and Southern Ubaid sites. Decoration was both geometric as well as naturalistic.

=== Burials ===
A large number of child burials (127) have been recovered from the upper 2 levels of the site. Most of these children were below the age of 2. The bodies were placed in a shallow bowl covered with a second bowl, which in turn was buried below the floors of the houses. Almost half of the burials came from building A, reinforcing the apparent importance of this building that is also evident from its wall decorations and size. The excavators have searched the environment of the site for evidence of a burial site for adults, but did not find any.

== See also ==
- Cities of the ancient Near East
- Tell Saadiya
- Tell Madhur
- Tell Yelkhi
- Tell Suleimah
