= Near Eastern archaeology =

Archaeological sub-discipline

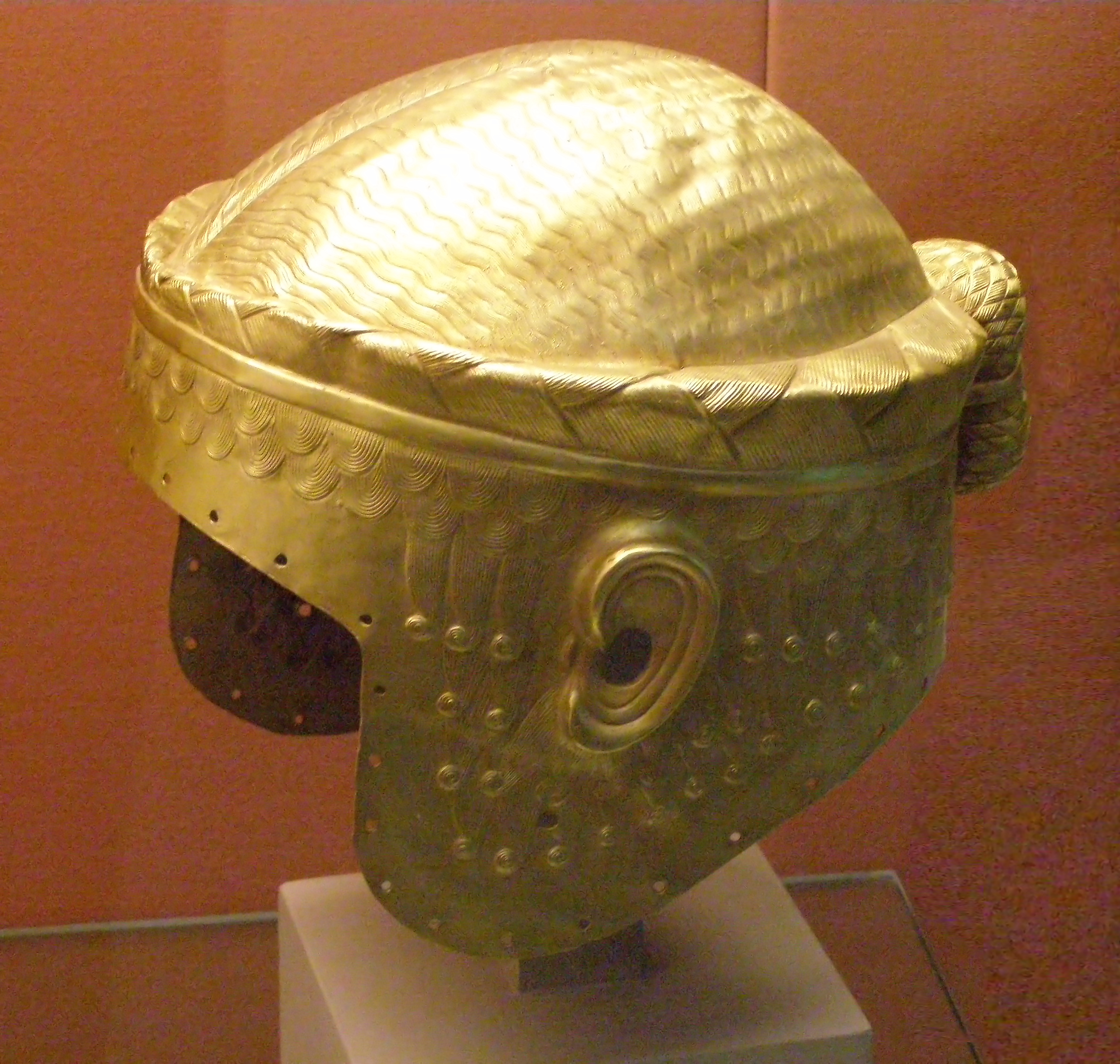
Meskalamdug helmet, British Museum electrotype copy, original was in the Iraq Museum, Bagdad. The holes around the border suggest that another piece was normally affixed, as for example in the full mask attributed to Sargon of Akkad. The hairbun attached at the back of the head is visible in other rulers as well, such as Sargon or Eannatum in the Stele of the Vultures.

Near Eastern archaeology is a regional branch of the wider, global discipline of archaeology. It refers generally to the excavation and study of artifacts and material culture of the Near East from antiquity to the recent past.

== Definition ==
The definition of the Near East is usually based around West Asia, the Balkans, and North Africa, including the historical Fertile Crescent, the Levant, Anatolia, East Thrace and Egypt. The history of archaeological investigation in this region grew out of the 19th century discipline of biblical archaeology, efforts mostly by Europeans to uncover evidence for Christian biblical narratives. Much archaeological work in this region is still influenced by that discipline, although within the last three decades there has been a marked tendency by some archaeologists to dissociate their work from biblical frameworks.

The most common fields of study are biblical archaeology dealing with the region and history of the Bible; Assyriology dealing with Mesopotamia; Egyptology dealing with the history of Ancient Egypt; and prehistoric archaeology which is not tied to a region but instead deals with the origins of culture before the invention of writing.

== Geographic subdivisions ==
=== Egypt ===
Egyptology is one example of a specialized branch that deals with the Nile Valley cultures of Egypt and associated regions in sub-Saharan Africa, the Sinai Peninsula to the east, and parts of North Africa. It includes language studies, history and archaeology and other related disciplines.

=== Southern Levant ===
The name Levant (or Syria-Palestine) is used to refer to the area adjacent to the east coast of the Mediterranean. The southern region included in this term encompasses Israel, the West Bank, Gaza Strip, and part of Jordan. Palestine was its ancient Roman and Byzantine name and was also in use during the Crusades (1095–1291), the period of Ottoman rule (1517–1917) and the British Mandate (1918–1948). The same region is also called the Holy Land, the Land of Israel, and Canaan. The foregoing names can be perceived as having political overtones, meaning that the more neutral, geographically based term the southern Levant has become popular with archaeologists who wish to refer to this area without prejudice or political orientation. In many contexts the Sinai Peninsula is also considered to be part of the southern Levant, although it is part of the modern state of Egypt. Archaeologically, it is distinguished from the heartland of Egypt, the Nile Valley and Delta.

=== Northern Levant ===
The term northern Levant can be used to refer to Lebanon, the Syrian littoral and portions of the Mediterranean coast of Turkey in the province of Hatay. These regions are often included in Greater Syria, a name used to refer to the whole area between Anatolia, Mesopotamia, and Arabia. The Mediterranean coast of Lebanon, the Syrian Arab Republic, and parts of northern Israel are also known as Phoenicia, after the ancient kingdom. However, this term suffers from the same problems as Canaan and equivalents and so is generally now only used in a strict historical sense.

=== Anatolia ===
The peninsula of Anatolia, most of modern Turkey, is bordered by several seas and includes parts of Northern Mesopotamia. The Tigris and Euphrates rise in Turkey and flow south into Iraq.

=== Cyprus ===
Cyprus (ancient Alashiya), a large island in the eastern Mediterranean was a separate cultural entity during most periods of human occupation. However, its proximity to both Anatolia and the northern and southern Levant was responsible for influences from and to both these regions. This was especially the case as Cyprus was an important source of copper for much of the region.

=== Mesopotamia ===
Mesopotamia ("The Land of Two Rivers") is considered to begin more or less near the modern border with Iraq and refers to the flat valley of the southern Tigris and Euphrates and their tributaries. These rivers empty into the Shatt al-Arab waterway that separates Iraq from Iran. Sumerology is a very specialized discipline that deals with the history, language and archaeology of ancient Sumer (southern Mesopotamia), mostly during the 4th and 3rd millennium BCE. Assyriology deals with the Assyrians who succeeded the Sumerians and covers much of the region while that language was still in use.

=== Iran ===
Iran, sometimes known as Persia, includes a large plateau and its periphery, including the Zagros Mountains. Sub-disciplines of this region deal mostly with the languages, history and archaeology of regions within this large area.

=== Arabian Peninsula ===
The Arabian Peninsula and its offshore islands is a separate geographical zone that has contacts with Sinai, the well-watered regions to the north, and by sea with the far-east.

== Organisations ==
Due to the historic interest in the archaeology of the Near East, especially due to the biblical links of the area, there are a large number of organisations dedicated to the archaeological investigation of the region. These include the American Society of Overseas Research which publishes the journal Near Eastern Archaeology Magazine, the Council for British Research in the Levant which publishes the journal Levant, and the Netherlands Institute for the Near East which publishes the journal Bibliotheca Orientalis.

== See also ==
- Assyriology
- List of Assyriologists
- Levantine archaeology
- Genetic history of the Middle East
- Near Eastern Archaeology
- Near Eastern bioarchaeology
- ICAANE (International Congress on the Archaeology of the Ancient Near East)
