= Tell Saadiya =

Archaeological settlement mound (tell) in Iraq

- Tell es-Saadiya
- Location within Iraq Location within Near East
- 34°11′N 45°07′E
- Type: tell
- Periods: Ubaid period
- Location: Diyala Governorate, Iraq
- Region: Mesopotamia

Site notes
- Excavation dates: 1979–1980
- Archaeologists: Piotr Bieliński, Stefan Kozłowski

Tell Saadiya (also Tell es-Saadiya) is a tell, or archaeological settlement mound, in Diyala Governorate (Iraq).

== Archaeological research ==
Excavations at the site were conducted in 1979–1980. They were part of an international salvage operation organized by the Iraqi Directorate of Antiquities which aimed to protect historical monuments in the Gebel Hamrin region endangered by the building of a dam on the Diyala River (Hamrin program, Hamrin Dam Salvage Project). Archaeological works at Tell Saadiya were carried out by a team from the Polish Centre of Mediterranean Archaeology University of Warsaw, headed by Stefan K. Kozłowski and Piotr Bieliński. The northern and western slopes of the small tell (about 80 m in diameter) had already been destroyed by construction works. Most of the site was occupied by a modern cemetery, which had disturbed the stratigraphy. The excavations uncovered a settlement from the Ubaid period (5th millennium BC) with multi-room houses built of sun-dried mud-bricks, as well as pottery kilns. Some of the houses were more impressive, featuring a central hall with rooms, usually smaller, adjacent to their longer sides. Child burials in urns were found under some of the floors. These burial containers, including beautifully-painted jugs, were the most valuable objects discovered at the site.

== See also ==
- Cities of the ancient Near East
- Tell Rashid
- Tell Abada
- Tell Madhur
- Tell Yelkhi
- Tell Suleimah
