= Nawala Al-Mutawalli =

Iraqi archaeologist

- Citizenship: Iraq
- Occupations: Archaeologist, museum director
- Known for: Director of the Iraq Museum during the Battle of Baghdad (2003)
- Awards: Honorary membership of the International Association for Assyriology

Academic background
- Education: University of Baghdad
- Thesis: (1994)

Academic work
- Discipline: Archaeology
- Sub-discipline: Epigraphy and philology
- Institutions: Iraq Museum; University of Baghdad

Nawala Ahmed Al-Mutawalli (Arabic: نوال المتولي) is an Iraqi archaeologist, philologist and former director of the Iraq Museum. She is also Professor Emeritus of Archaeology at the University of Mosul. In 2021, she was appointed as an honorary member of the International Association for Assyriology, in recognition for her work. She is an expert in cuneiform and bullae and has published extensively on the archaeology of Iraq.

== Education and career ==
Al-Mutalwalli graduated from the University of Baghdad with a degree in archaeology in 1976, and graduated from the same institution with a PhD in 1994. She has excavated at the sites of Tell Aswad, the Hamrin Dam, Ishan Mazyad, Umma, and Aqarquf. She is an expert in cuneiform and bullae and has published extensively on the archaeology of Iraq. From 1995 to 2000 she was Head of Cuneiform at the Iraq Museum. She was subsequently the museum's director from 2000 to 2003. In 2000 she co-convened a celebration of 5000 years of writing in Iraq. She was director of the Department of Archaeology at the University of Baghdad from 2017 to 2018.

== Iraq Museum and the Battle of Baghdad ==
Looting, as a result of the 2003 invasion of Iraq, took place during Al-Mutawalli's tenure as director and she estimated at the time that 12,000 objects (Note: The number given varied at the time, between 33 and 170,000.) were looted from the collection. Reported by The Art Newspaper to be a member of the Ba'ath Party (which was almost compulsory under Saddam Hussein's regime), after the fall of Baghdad, museum employees demanded her resignation. This was based on accusations reported in The Atlantic that Al-Mutawelli had been complicit in longer-term looting of Iraqi antiquities orchestrated by the regime. In The Rape of Mesopotamia, Lawrence Rothfield described how al-Mutawalli was issued with an AK-47, and guarded the museum alongside other colleagues and archaeologists preceding the Battle of Baghdad.

== Recognition ==
In 2021, she was appointed as an honorary member of the International Association for Assyriology, in recognition for her work. She is also Professor Emeritus of Archaeology at the University of Mosul.

== Selected works ==
- Al-Mutawalli, Nawala Ahmed, et al. Bullae from the Main Tell: Documents of Umma's Administration in the Early Old Babylonian Period. With a Contribution by Adelheid Otto. Harrassowitz Verlag, 2024.
- al-Mutawalli, Nawala Ahmed. 2010. "Administrative Cuneiform Texts from Umma in the Iraq Museum. Excavation of Shara Temple." Sumer 55: 45–86.
- Al-Mutawalli N. A New foundation cylinder from the Temple of Nabû ša ḫarê. Iraq. 1999;61:191-194.
