= Tell Suleimah =

- Location within Iraq
- 34°10′3″N 45°6′11″E
- Type: settlement
- Periods: Bronze Age
- Location: Diyala Governorate (Iraq)

History
- Built: Early 3th millennium BC

Site notes
- Excavation dates: 1977-1984
- Archaeologists: Rabia al-Qaisi, Mohammed Mahmud Shakir, Salma Salman
- Condition: Ruined
- Owner: Public
- Public access: Yes

Tell Suleimah (also Tell Suleimeh, Tell Sleima, Tell Sleimah, Tell as-Suleimeh, Tell Sulaimah, Tell as-Sulaima, and Tell Sulayma) is an ancient Near East archaeological site in Diyala Governorate (Iraq), lying about one kilometer east of the Diyala river and about 50 kilometers northeast of ancient Eshnunna. It was examined as part of the Hamrin Dam salvage excavation (as Hamrin #12) before it flooded. Other sites a part of that rescue excavation included, Me-Turan, Tell Gubah, Tell Songor, Tellul Hamediyat, Tell Rubeidheh, Tell Madhur, Tell Imlihiye, Tell Rashid, Tell Saadiya and Tell Abada. Tell Suleimah was the largest site in the inundation area. The names of Awal and Batir have been proposed as the ancient name of the site.

== Archaeology ==
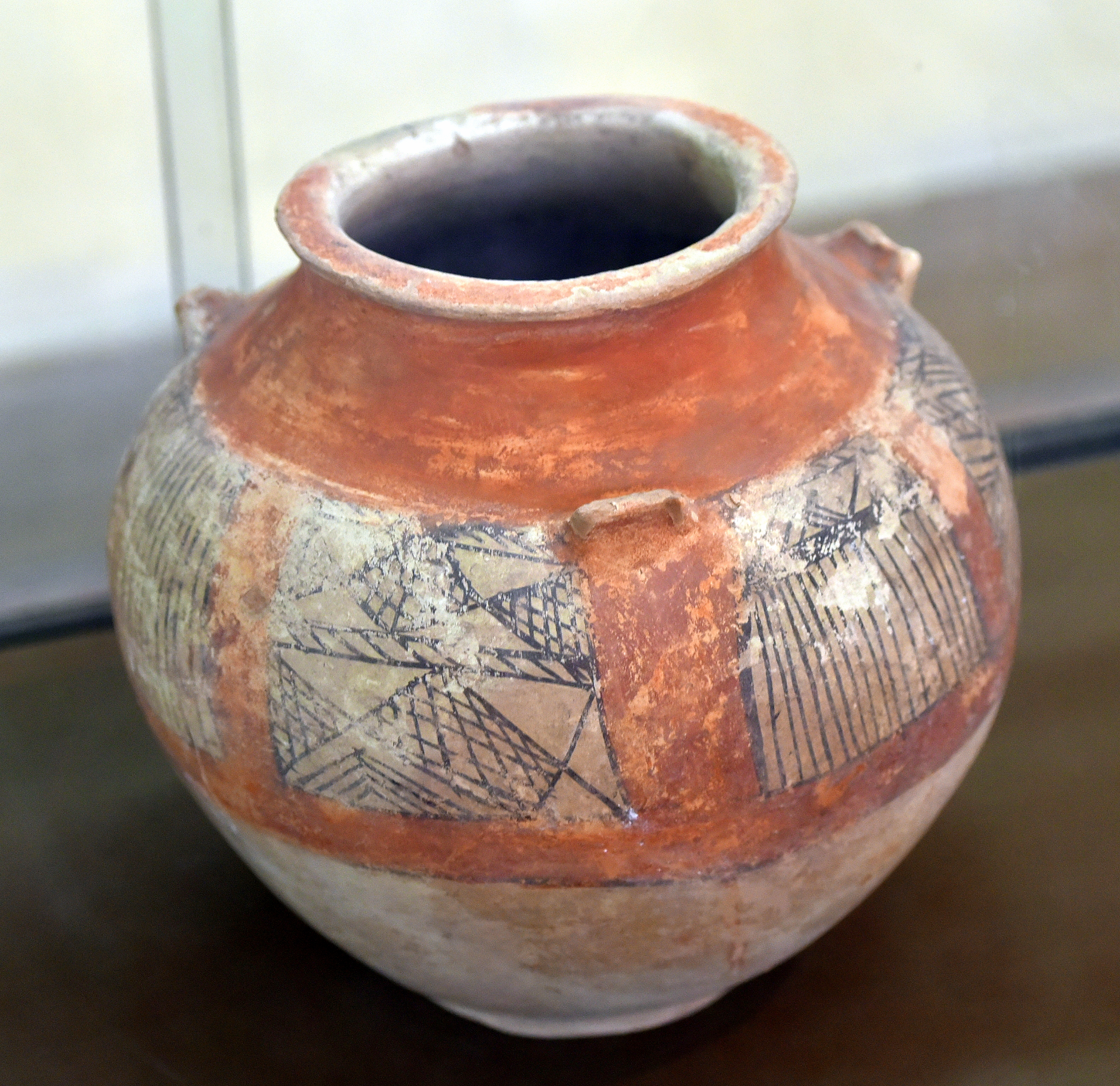
Painted jar, geometric designs, the so-called "Scarlet Ware". From Iraq, Tell Abu Qasim, Hamrin Basin, Diyala Valley. c. 2800-2600 BC. Iraq Museum

The mound has an extent of about 280 meters east–west by 240 meters north–south (total site area of about 6 hectares) and rises to about 14.5 meters above the plain. It was excavated in several seasons between 1977 and 1984 by a team from the Iraq State Organization for Antiquities and Heritage led by Rabia al-Qaisi, Mohammed Mahmud Shakir and Salma Salman. A large building (Building 2) with a central courtyard surrounded by rooms on three side was interpreted as a palace. Most of the rooms on the south side were lost. In an Akkadian Empire period building 47 cuneiform tablets were found. A large 29 meter by 50 meter trench was excavated down thru the Akkadian Empire levels. A 5 meter by 5 meter sounding at the highest point of the mound found virgin soil at a depth of 17 meters, about 3 meters below the plain. A step trench was excavated in the northwest slope of the mound. The step trench revealed an 25 meter in diameter mud-brick oval building with six architectural levels with the latest being Akkadian Empire (rectangular bricks) and the earliest Early Dynastic III (plano-convex bricks). The building was constructed of 5 concentric walls (without gaps between) for a total thickness of 6 meters. At the center of the oval building was a 13 meter by 18 meter depression (about 3.5 meters deep) and at the lowest level Scarlet Ware (contemporary with the Early Dynastic I period) was found, below a level with and altar and fire installation. Uncharacterized lighter built building were found in the area surrounding the oval building and graves produced Akkadian Empire period cylinder seals. Another sounding, on the southwest flank, produced mainly Parthian remains. Finds at the site included a number of seal impressed pottery sherds. Publication of the site excavations has been limited to short field notes.

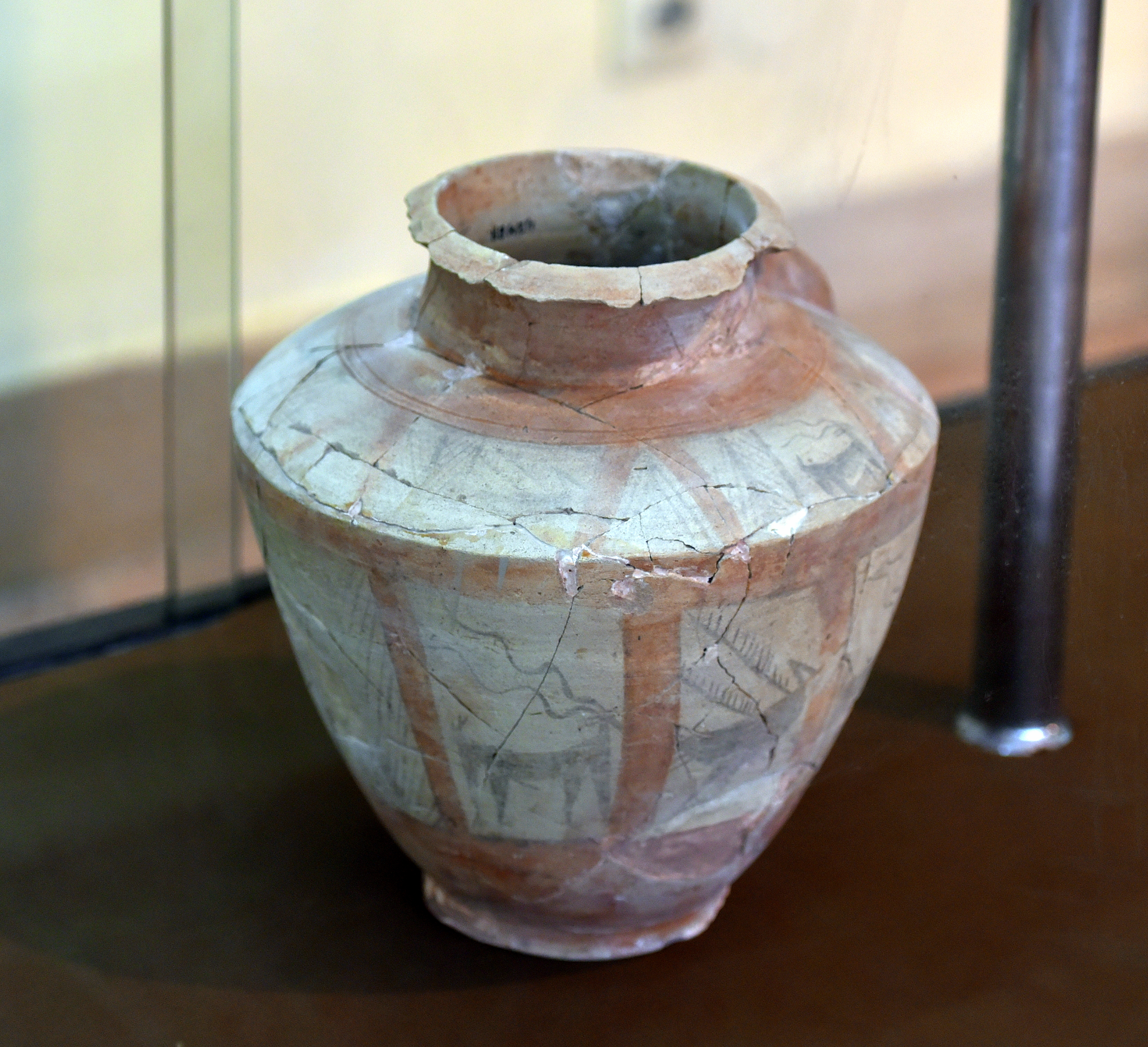
Painted jar, geometric designs and animals, "Scarlet Ware". Tell Abu Qasim, Hamrin Basin, Diyala Valley. 2800-2600 BC. Iraq Museum

Eight levels were found in the main excavations while twenty levels were seen in a deep sounding on the northeast part of the tell. Note that what constitutes Isin-Larsa period vs Old Babylonian period is defined differently by various scholars.

- Level I - Old Babylonian - A building on level I produced 14 cuneiform tablets found in Room 2 (which contained two altars) some dated to the reigns of Old Babylonian period rulers of Eshnunna Ibal-pi-el II (c. 1779–1765 BC) and Silli-Sin (c. 1764-1756 BC) and small finds included metal jewelry and vessels (bowls, beakers and plates) and a metal dagger. In total 23 cuneiform tablets from this period were found. An oath formula on the tablets invoked the god Tišpak. One tablet, IM 85444, discussing a theft from the temple of Shamash, included a previously unknown year date formula mentioning the city of Malgium.
- Level II - Old Babylonian / Isin-Larsa - The plan was much different than Level I with 120 mostly houses, most with backed brick thresholds and decorated altars. Large building with a brick paved courtyard and 23 rooms, one room having painted murals (Room 4) and another with 8 horns embedded in black painted walls. Together, in Levels I and II, 85 graves (some jar burials) were excavated.
- Level III - Old Babylonian / Isin-Larsa - Grave finds included metal fenestrated axes, one bearing a zoomorphic relief.
- Levels IV to VII - Akkadian Empire period - In a building in the southeastern part of the mound, interpreted as having an administrative function, 47 cuneiform tablets were found. The tablets were found in a room with a central platform thought to be an altar. The tablets are divided in eight groups i.e. 8 personnel (list of workers etc.), 24 loans of barley (occasionally emmer wheat) with interest, 6 sheep transactions, 2 land purchase, 2 allocations of land, 2 livestock, 1 chairs, 2 various goods. For volume measurements both a local gur and the Gur of Akkad are used. A number of unknown toponyms are mentioned in the tablets as well as the known Akkad (a-ka₃-de₂^{ki}), Dūrum (durum^{ki}) and Awal (a-wa-al^{ki}). Based on paleography the tablets were dated to early in the reign of Akkad ruler Naram-Sin
- Level VIII - Early Dynastic III

== History ==
The site was occupied throughout the 3rd millennium BC and somewhat into the early 2nd millennium BC with an apparent gap in the archaeological remains during the Ur III period. Traces of Parthian era remains were also noted.

== Name ==
The names of Awal (based on Akkadian period tablets where it appears a number of times) and Batir (based on an Akkadian Empire period cylinder seal which mentioned the "Lady of Batir") have been proposed for the site. An inscribed brick was also found at Tell Suleimah which read "Aiiabum, son of ..., ... chief of Batir, built the temple of the goddess Batirītum for hi[s] (own) life". Nearby Tell Yelkhi has also been suggested as Awal. Yet another suggested location is the nearby Sakaltutan Pass (34°14'51.53" N 44°53'24.98" E).

=== Awal ===
The city of Awal is known from 3rd millennium BC textual sources. It is mentioned in Akkadian Empire texts. At some point after the fall of the Akkadian Empire, "Awal, Kismar, Maskan-sarrum, the [la]nd of Esnunna, the [la]nd of Tutub, the [lan]d of Simudar, the [lan]d of Akkad" briefly came under the control of Puzur-Inshushinak of Elam as the first Third Dynasty ruler, Ur-Nammu, reports liberating those cities. Babati, thought to be a governor under Ur III ruler Amar-Sin is reported as "... Babati, the scribe, auditor ... and governor of Awal and Apiak; canal inspector who has irrigated the land; ... temple administrator of Bēlat-Terraban and Bēlat-Śuḫnir, ...".

== See also ==
- Cities of the ancient Near East
- Chronology of the ancient Near East
