= Tell Djassa =

Archaeological site in Syria

- Location within Syria Location within Near East
- 36°35′15″N 40°40′27″E
- Type: tell
- Periods: Early Dynastic period, Hellenistic period
- Location: Hasakah Governorate, Syria
- Region: Upper Mesopotamia

Site notes
- Height: 16 metre
- Area: 2 hectare
- Excavation dates: 1988; 1989; 1990
- Archaeologists: Piotr Bieliński, Maria Krogulska

Tell Djassa (Tell Djassa el-Gharbi) is an archaeological site in Syria, in the Khabur River basin, in the area of the Khabur Triangle in Upper Mesopotamia.

== Archaeological Research ==
The site was excavated in 1988–1990 as part of the Western Hassake Dam Project, an international salvage project organized by the Syrian Directorate-General of Antiquities and Museums. In the framework of the same project, the site of Tell Abu Hafur, located about 2.5 km away, was also studied. The tell was 16 m high and 150 m wide, covering an area of about 2 hectares. Four main phases of occupation were distinguished, all dating to the 3rd millennium BC, the Early Dynastic period, especially sub-period III (2500–2300 BC). The site was resettled at the end of the 1st millennium BC, as indicated by fragments of Hellenistic pottery. The research was conducted under the auspices of the Polish Centre of Mediterranean Archaeology University of Warsaw and directed by Maria Krogulska (1988) and Piotr Bieliński (1989–1990). Some of the ceramic vessels from Tell Djassa now form part of the collection of the National Museum in Warsaw. One of the most interesting discoveries was a lead figurine, presumably of the goddess Ishtar. Finds included three Third-millennium BC clay figurines (2 anthropomorphic and 1 zoomorphic).
