= Tell Abu Hafur =

- Tell Abu Hafur 1, Tell Abu Hafur I
- Location within Syria Location within Near East
- 36°36′26″N 40°39′41″E
- Type: tell
- Periods: Early Dynastic III, Akkad period, Ninevite V, Ubaid period, Uruk period
- Location: Hasakah Governorate, Syria
- Region: Upper Mesopotamia

Site notes
- Height: 20 metre, 5 metre
- Area: 3 hectare, 1 hectare
- Excavation dates: 1989; 1988; 1990
- Archaeologists: Maria Krogulska, Piotr Bieliński

Tell Abu Hafur is an archaeological site in Syria, in the Khabur River basin, in the area of the Khabur Triangle in Upper Mesopotamia.

== Archaeological research ==
The site was excavated in 1988–1990 as part of the Western Hassake Dam Project, an international salvage project organized by the Syrian Directorate-General of Antiquities and Museums. The research was conducted under the auspices of the Polish Centre of Mediterranean Archaeology University of Warsaw and directed by Maria Krogulska (1988) and Piotr Bieliński (1989–1990). In the framework of the same project, the team also studied the site of Tell Djassa, located about 2.5 km away.

Tell Abu Hafur consists of two tells: the main one is 200 m long and 16 m high, the other (Tell Abu Hafur East) 130 m long and 5 m high. Nine archaeological layers were distinguished on the main tell. The youngest phase, dating to the Early Dynastic period, yielded the richest finds – the remains of four mud-brick houses located along a street paved with stones as well as seven graves. The smaller tell functioned in later times, as attested by the remains of fortifications from the Mitanni period (2nd millennium BC) and structures dated to the Neo-Assyrian period. Pottery finds indicate that the settlement continued in the Hellenistic, Parthian-Roman, and early Islamic periods.

An interesting find was a terracotta figurine, a so-called eye idol, typical of the Uruk culture. Such idols have been found in different parts of the Near East: Mesopotamia, Syria, Elam, the largest number at Tell Brak.
