= Barwana massacre =

Terrorist incident in Iraq

Coordinates: 33.9978°N 44.8661°E

- Part of War in Iraq (2013–2017)
- Location: Barwana, Miqdadiyah, Iraq
- Date: 28 January 2015
- Deaths: 70+
- Perpetrator: Unknown Shia militia
- Motive: Revenge for ISIS atrocities or ISIS propaganda aimed at increasing sectarianism

The Barwana massacre was committed by unknown Shia militia members as a revenge for ISIS atrocities. It allegedly involved the sectarian execution-style killing of over 70 unarmed boys and men in the small Sunni village of Barwana, which is just west of Miqdadiyah, Iraq.

Some security officials disputed the accounts, with some saying that ISIS militants were responsible and others that they were fabricated by ISIS supporters.

== Attack ==
The attack allegedly occurred on 28 January 2015, within the context of the military intervention against the Islamic State of Iraq and the Levant. The victims were refugees who had fled the previous ISIS advance in the region. Thirty-five other males were missing, or suspected of being detained.

According to Sunni witnesses, the security forces broke down doors and rounded up men in house-to-house searches, with the village chief saying, "They fooled me – they told me this would be a check of the names of displaced families."

== Aftermath ==
Later, reporters seeking to visit the village, to gain information, were denied access.

The massacre is being investigated by Human Rights Watch.

== Reactions ==
Iraqi military officials dismissed the massacre reports as a fabrication. According to the Saudi owned Asharq Al-Awsat, despite “similar instances” of Shia militias “committing sectarian atrocities.”

The attack was condemned by the Sunni-Salafi Association of Muslim Scholars as a "sectarian crime that clearly shows how much those militias characterized by lack of ethics to a limit that they have killed unarmed civilians in front of their families and relatives in a massacre of no less heinous than the previous ones committed by the governments of occupation and associated militias."

== See also ==
- Musab bin Umair mosque massacre
