= Marea (ancient city) =

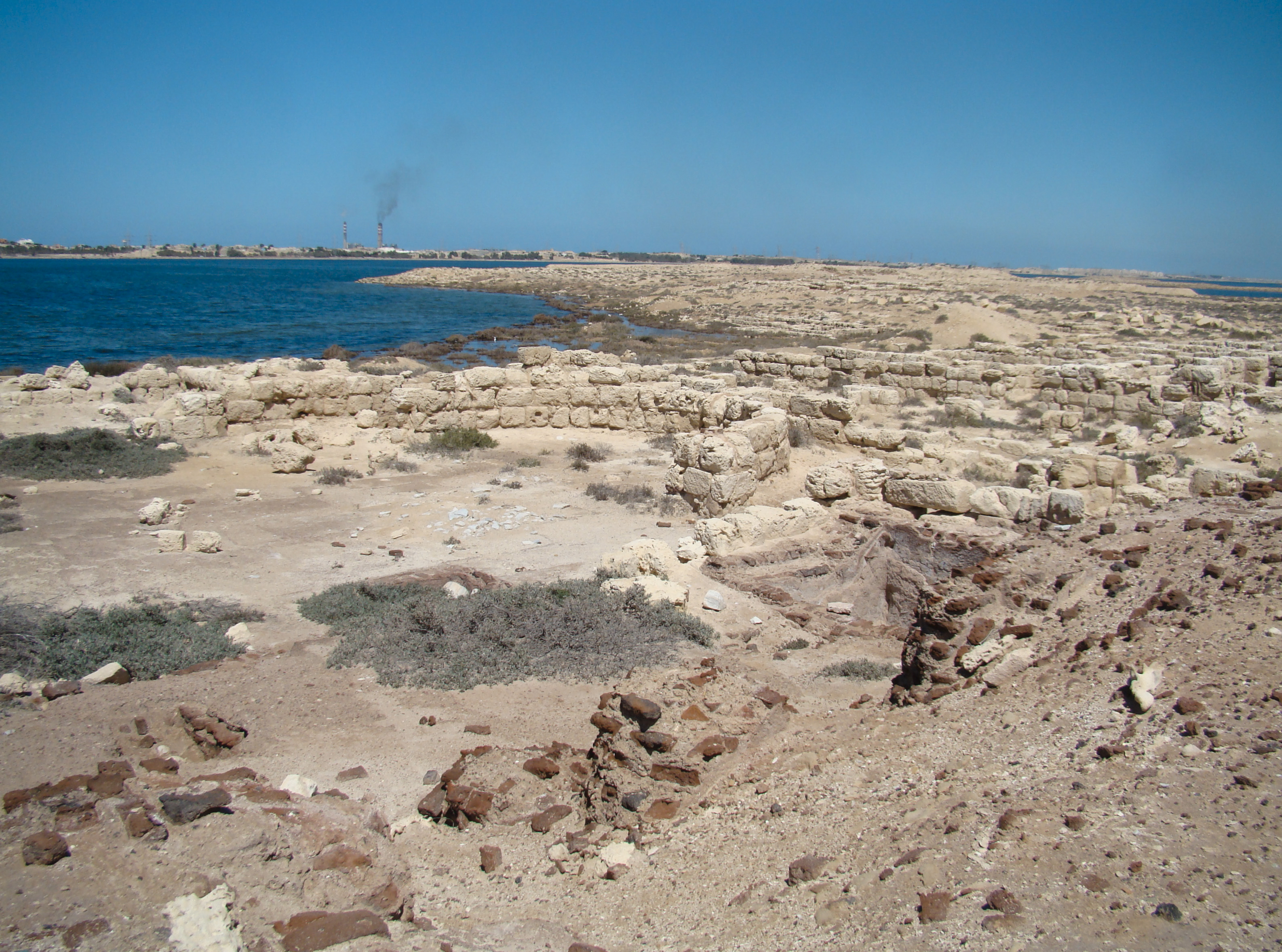
- Ruins of the port city of Marea

- Location in Egypt
- Coordinates: 30°59′39″N 29°39′20″E
- Country: Egypt
- Time zone: UTC+2 (EST)

Marea (Ancient Egyptian: pr-mrt; Ancient Greek: Μαρεη Mareē, Μαρεια Mareia, Μαρια Maria; Latin: Marea) was an ancient city in Egypt, located 45 km south-west of Alexandria, on the southern shore of Lake Maryut (ancient Mareōtis, Μαρεωτις).

== History ==
The pharaoh Psamtik I installed a garrison at Marea in 654 BCE to secure the western borders of his kingdom after he had previously defeated the Libyan tribes living in the area who had taken over the Oxyrhynchite nome of Lower Egypt.

== Archaeological research ==
pr Z1 U7 r n n n t niwt
pr-mrt
in hieroglyphs
Era: Late Period
(664–332 BC)

In 1977–1981, archaeological excavations were conducted by researchers from the University of Alexandria. Since 2000, the work is carried out by a Polish expedition from several scientific institutions, including the Archaeological Museum of Kraków and the Institute of Archaeology and the Polish Centre of Mediterranean Archaeology (both University of Warsaw). The expedition is currently headed by Prof. Tomasz Derda (Institute of Archaeology UW) and Dr. Krzysztof Babraj (Archaeological Museum of Kraków). In 2003, excavations in the Byzantine basilica began.

== Description of the site ==
The site of Marea was a large port city in the Roman period, and possibly already in the Ptolemaic times. The research results indicate that the harbor might have functioned until the medieval period, as attested by finds dated to the 13th–14th century. Its remains include four large jetties, the longest of which extends 120 m into the lake. The ancient city was famous for its wine, which was distributed throughout the Mediterranean Basin. The amphorae in which it was transported were also produced locally. Marea was undoubtedly a large pottery production center – one of the largest pottery kilns in Egypt was found here. A bath complex and a funerary chapel dated to the 6th century, as well as a large (49 m by 47 m) basilica with a transept, are examples of Byzantine architecture at the site. An important discovery was made in 2001: the largest known set of ostraca from the 5th–6th century was found, inscribed with notes regarding the construction of the basilica. Under the basilica, the excavators uncovered the remains of an older church, dated preliminarily to the second half of the 4th century. The history of this center from the end of the 3rd century to the building of the Byzantine city in the 5th–6th century is also the object of study.
