= Tell Rijim =

Archaeological site in Iraq

Tell Rijim is an archaeological site in Iraq, in ancient Upper Mesopotamia, in the valley of the Tigris River, about 25 kilometers to the north-west of Eski Mosul.

== Archaeological research ==
The site was explored in 1984–1985 as part of the Eski Mosul Dam Salvage Project (later renamed Saddam Dam Salvage Project), an international archaeological salvage operation organized by the Iraqi Directorate of Antiquities in the 1980s due to the building of a dam on the Tigris River. Excavations on Tell Rijim were conducted by an expedition from the Polish Centre of Mediterranean Archaeology University of Warsaw, directed by Piotr Bieliński, during three field seasons. The site is a relatively small tell (2.5 hectares), with archaeological layers dating to many different periods. Six skeletal graves, presumably from the Sassanid period (3rd–6th century AD), were discovered on the top of the hill. Neo-Assyrian remains were uncovered just below the surface. They consisted of buildings with stone foundations, rectangular rooms, and paved courtyards; the houses were furnished with bread ovens. Four cylinder seals dated to the second half of the 8th century BC are an important find from this layer. The best-preserved are the remains of a settlement of the Khabur Ware Culture from the first half of the 2nd millennium BC, which was surrounded by a defense wall. A large part of a residential building was uncovered in the western area of the site and Ninevite 5 graves in the central one. The oldest layers date to the Uruk period. The erosion of the tell, which occurred during the breaks in the settlement, hindered the excavations. The Polish expedition also carried out work at the site of Tell Raffaan, located in the same micro-region.

== See also ==
- Cities of the ancient Near East
- Tell Deir Situn
- Tell Mohammed ‘Arab
