= Hamrin =

Town in Saladin Governorate, Iraq

Coordinates: 33°51′23″N 45°29′56″E

Hamrin is a town in northern Iraq which sits on the western shore of a man-made lake of the same name, both of which are at the southern extreme of the Hamrin Mountains. Hamrin is home to approximately 25,000 people. Most revenue comes from fishing and subsistence agriculture.

== See also ==
- Lake Hamrin
