= The International Association for Assyriology =

Organisation for study of Assyrian history

- Formation: July 2003
- Founded at: London, England
- Location: Leiden, Netherlands
- Affiliations: British Institute for the Study of Iraq; American Oriental Society; Deutsche Orient-Gesellschaft; The Israel Society for Assyriology and Ancient Near Eastern Studies; Société pour l’étude du Proche-Orient ancien
- Website: iaassyriology.com

The International Association for Assyriology (IAA) is a non-profit, non-political organization founded in July 2003, and seated in Leiden that "the fields of Cuneiform Studies, ancient Near Eastern History and Archaeology on an international basis and to act as a representative body for these fields in relationship to national, international and private institutions, as well as the general public".

According to the Union of International Associations, this organization was founded in "July 2003, London (UK), during International Congress of Assyriology and Near Eastern Archaeology (RAI)".

== Rencontre Assyriologique Internationale ==
The IAA holds an annual congress, the Rencontre Assyriologique Internationale that assembles scholars from all the world at centres of Near Eastern research. Associations and societies are affiliated like The American Oriental Society, British Institute for the Study of Iraq, Deutsche Orient-Gesellschaft, The Israel Society for Assyriology and Ancient Near Eastern Studies and Société pour l’étude du Proche-Orient ancien.

== List of presidents ==
- 2003–2005 — Wilfred van Soldt
- 2005–2010 — Jack M. Sasson
- 2010–2014 — Piotr Michalowski
- 2014–2018 — Cécile Michel
- 2019–present — Walther Sallaberger

== Honorary Council ==
- C. Wilcke (2012)
- J. Sasson (2014)
- D. Owen (2014)
- S. Zawadzki (2015)
- Hermann Hunger (2015)
- J.S. Cooper (2016)
- D. Collon (2016)
- I. Winter (2017)
- J. Klein (2017)
- Michael Roaf (2018)
- A.K. Mohammed (2021)
- P. Michalowski (2021)
- N.M. al-Mutawalli (2021)
- M. Stol (2023)
