= Near Eastern Archaeology (journal) =

Journal

- Language: English
- Edited by: Dr Christina Tsouparopoulou (UKSW Warsaw)

Publication details
- Former name: The Biblical Archaeologist
- History: 1938–present
- Publisher: University of Chicago Press for the American Society of Overseas Research (United States)
- Frequency: Quarterly

Standard abbreviations
- ISO 4: Near East. Archaeol.

Indexing
- ISSN: 2325-5404 (print); 1094-2076 (web)
- OCLC no.: 45566167

Links
- Journal homepage

Near Eastern Archaeology is an American journal covering art, archaeology, history, anthropology, literature, philology, and epigraphy of the Near Eastern and Mediterranean worlds from the Palaeolithic through Ottoman periods. The journal is written for a general audience and is published quarterly by the American Society of Overseas Research. The current editor is Christina Tsouparopoulou. All articles undergo peer review prior to publication. The journal is electronically archived by JSTOR with a three-year moving wall.

== The Biblical Archaeologist (1938-1997) ==
The journal was established in 1938 by archaeologist George Ernest Wright as The Biblical Archaeologist, out of "the need for a readable, non-technical, yet thoroughly reliable account of archaeological discoveries as they are related to the Bible...".

In 1998 it was renamed Near Eastern Archaeology, to reflect the publication's broader geographic, chronological, and intellectual scope.

== See also ==
- Near Eastern Archaeology
- Near Eastern bioarchaeology
