= Tell Raffaan =

Archaeological site in Iraq

Tell Raffaan (Tall Raffan) is an archaeological site in Iraq, in ancient Upper Mesopotamia, in the valley of the Tigris River.

== Excavation ==
Exploration of the site began in 1984 as part of the Eski Mosul Dam Salvage Project, an international archaeological salvage operation organized by the Iraqi Directorate of Antiquities due to the building of a dam on the Tigris River. Excavations on Tell Raffaan and in its vicinity were conducted by an expedition from the Polish Centre of Mediterranean Archaeology University of Warsaw. Piotr Bieliński directed the archaeological works, while Ryszard F. Mazurowski and Waldemar Chmielewski headed the field survey team, which identified Paleolithic sites on the hills surrounding the micro-region. The research was conducted only in the eastern part of the tell since a modern cemetery occupied the western one.

The Polish expedition also carried out work at the site of Tell Rijim, located in the same micro-region.

== Archaeological findings ==
At its highest point, Tell Raffaan rose 6.5 metres (21 ft) above the level of the Tigris. Only one archaeological layer was identified, dating to the Early Uruk period (second half of the 4th millennium BC). The excavations yielded numerous fragments of pottery as well as obsidian and flint tools. On the slope, there was a skeletal grave in a stone setting, furnished with three undecorated cups similar to the pottery found in other parts of the site. This part of the tell was badly eroded; no architectural remains were uncovered.
