= Hemrin Dam =

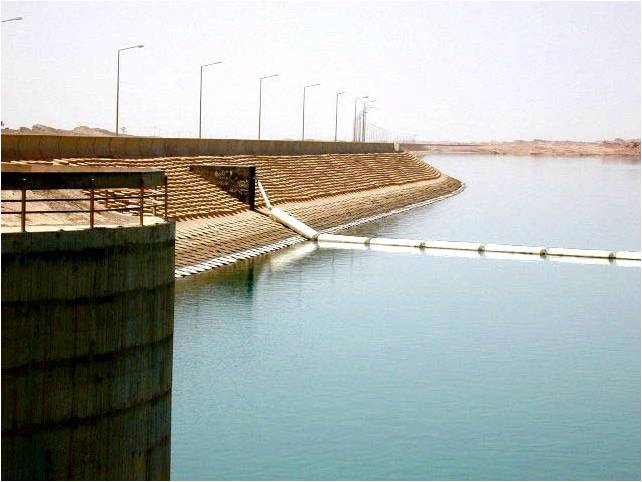
- Upstream side of the dam

- Location within Iraq
- Official name: Hemrin Dam
- Country: Iraq
- Location: 100 km northeast of Baghdad, Iraq, Diyala Governorate, Iraq
- Coordinates: 34°06′52″N 44°58′04″E
- Status: Operational
- Construction began: 1976
- Opening date: 1981
- Owner: Ministry of Water Resources

Dam and spillways
- Impounds: Diyala River
- Height: 53 m (174 ft)
- Length: 3,360 m (11,020 ft)

Reservoir
- Creates: Hemrin Reservoir
- Total capacity: 2,040,000,000 m^{3} (1,650,000 acre⋅ft)

Power Station
- Commission date: 1981
- Installed capacity: 50 MW

The Hemrin Dam is a dam on the Diyala River 100 km northeast of Baghdad, Iraq. The main purpose of the dam is flood control, irrigation and hydroelectric generation. Its power station has a 50 MW capacity. The dam and the attached power house were built in years 1976-1981 by the then Yugoslav company GIK Hidrogradnja (of Sarajevo, now Bosnia-Herzegovina). All the equipment (gates, turbines, generators) were also supplied by the then-Yugoslav companies.

A large archaeological salvage operation was undertaken to excavate archaeological sites that were at risk of flooding once the reservoir (now Hamrin Lake) would start to fill. Sites that were excavated as part of this operation included Tell Madhur, Tell Suleimah, Tell Rashid, Tell Saadiya, Tell Yelkhi, and Tell Abada. One member of the team was the former director of the Iraq Museum, Nawala Al-Mutawalli.

== See also ==
- List of dams and reservoirs in Iraq
- List of power stations in Iraq
