= Tell Yelkhi =

Archaeological site in Iraq

- Location within Iraq
- 34°17′8″N 45°0′5″E
- Type: settlement
- Periods: Bronze Age
- Location: Diyala Governorate (Iraq)

History
- Built: Early 3th millennium BC

Site notes
- Excavation dates: 1977-1980
- Archaeologists: Antonio Invernizzi, G. Bergamini
- Condition: Ruined
- Owner: Public
- Public access: Yes

Tell Yelkhi, is an ancient Near East archaeological site in Diyala Governorate (Iraq). It was examined as part of the Hamrin Dam salvage excavation before it flooded. Other sites a part of that rescue excavation included, Me-Turan, Tell Gubah, Tell Songor, Tellul Hamediyat, Tell Rubeidheh, Tell Madhur, Tell Imlihiye, Tell Rashid, Tell Saadiya and Tell Abada. Some of these sites, including Tell Yelkhi, periodically emerge from the water. The site of Tell Yelkhi was settled in the early 3rd millennium BC and occupation continued through the Kassite period late in the 2nd millennium BC. Its name in ancient times is not yet known though Awal^{ki} (known during the Akkadian, Ur III, and Old Babylonian periods) has been suggested.

== Archaeology ==
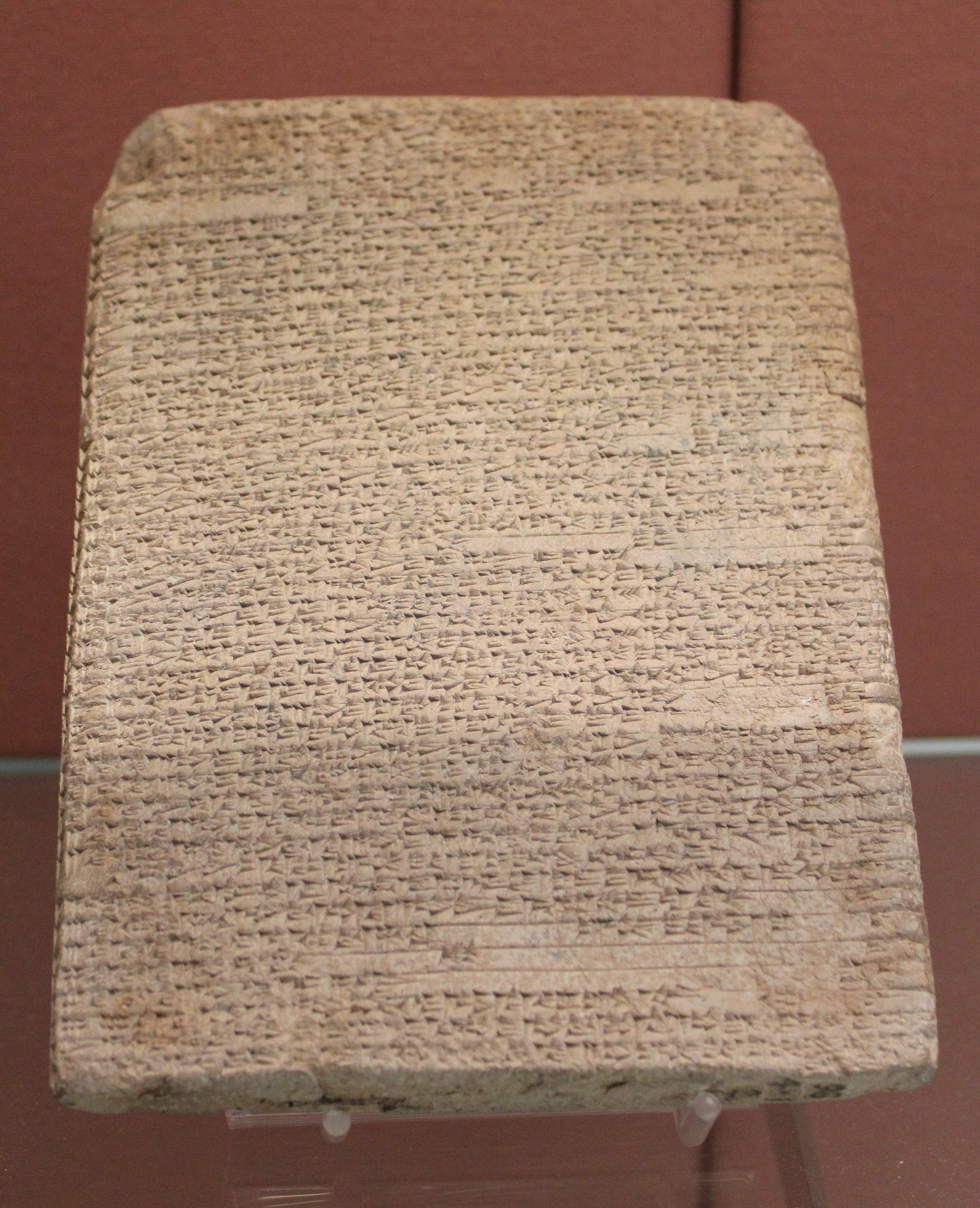
Old Babylonian period omen tablet

The oval mound (220 meters by 170 meters) rises about 12 meters above the plain, having two peaks, one lower than the other, and covers an area of about 4 hectares. The edges of the main mound have eroded somewhat, removing some Level I Kassite remains, and modern period graves have damaged the site. Tell Yelkhi was excavated for three seasons, from 1977 to 1980, by a team from the Italian Archaeological Expedition led by Antonio Invernizzi and G. Bergamini. Excavation was conducted in two areas A, at the top of the mound exposing Levels I and II, and B, a 30 by 10 meter stratigraphic trench on the southeast side of the mound exposing Levels III, IV and V, VI, VII, and VIII. Additionally, four 4-meter by 4-meter soundings on the tell reached virgin soil, exposing Levels IX and X. Excavators defined ten occupation levels. As part of the excavation a photogrammatical survey was conducted. Stratigraphic soundings and minor excavations were also conducted on some of the surrounding area and sites.

- Level IX/X - Early Dynastic, partially below water table. ED cylinder seal found in grave. (Early 3rd millennium BC)
- Level VIII - Akkadian Empire. Residential occupation with a large industrial area on the western part. (c. 2334 – 2154 BC)
- Level VI/VII - Ur III. A monumental temple complex with a courtyard and buttressed doorways and containing an altar was built on a foundation of pure sand on Level VI, found on the eastern part. A large rectangular building with pods built on mud brick arches was found on the western part. (c. 2112 BC – c. 2004 BC)
- Level IV/V - Isin-Larsa period. A large palace with a courtyard and about 70 cuneiform tablets holding administrative texts was found on Level V. Burial chambers and graves were excavated. A large public building designed for storage was excavated, on Level V, holding many storage jars containing remnants of cereals. Numerous cylindrical beakers were also found in this space. Carbon-14 samples were taken. This building was destroyed by fire and, combined with other evidence from the level, led the excavators to believe the city was sacked. A high-status grave of a tall woman with some metal ornaments was found in the floor of the main room of the building. (Early 2nd millennium BC)
- Level III - Old Babylonian and Eshnunna. Forty cuneiform tablets and fragments (literary, administrative, and omen texts) were found, associated with a small rectangular temple containing an altar and offering table. Mainly industrial activities. Two phases, IIIa and IIIb. (17th to 18th century BC)
- Period of abandonment
- Level II - Mitanni, Sealand, and Elamite. Remains heavily cut by the Level I foundations. (c. 1525–1400 BC)
- Level I - Kassite. A large 12-room fortified palace built with thick walls and "particularly deep foundations" covers most of the main mound. It was in use from the early through to the late Kassite period. It was cut by an Islamic cemetery of recent date. (c. 1400-1100 BC)

Finds included several cuneiform tablets. Eight tablets were omen texts. An archive, found in the same layer (Level IIIb) mentions the Babylon ruler Ibal-pi-el II. Tablets in a strata contemporary to Level I at the nearby site of Tell Imlihiye carried the names of Kassite rulers Kadasman-Enlil, Kudur-Enlil, Sagarakti-Surias, and Kastilias IV.

A number of terracotta figurines were excavated in Levels I to VI. In the Kassite remains (Level I) barley, dates, and legumes were found. A bronze fenestrated shaft hole axe was found in a grave in the Isin-Larsa level.

=== Tell Kesaran ===
This low but large (240 meters by 110 meters in area and about 3 meters in height) site lies across a wadi from Tell Yelkhi, about 1/5 kilometer away. In 1979 and 1980, the Italian Archaeological Expedition led by E. Valtz excavated three adjoining 4-meter by 4-meter trenches on the summit and nine small (1.5-meter by 3-meter) test pits at various points. These established a Kassite period industrial (mainly pottery production) and residential occupation. Minor Late Assyrian occupation was recorded in the form of pottery shards, graves, and a 7th-century BC cylinder seal.

== History ==
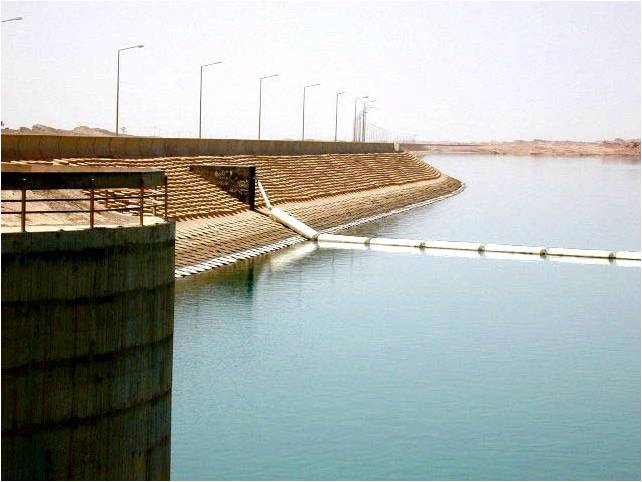
Hemrin Dam Upstream

The site was first settled in the Early Dynastic period (possibly the prior Jemdat Nasr period), early in the 3rd century BC, with residential occupation continuing into the Akkadian Empire period. Late in the 3rd millennium BC, under the Ur III empire, a large temple and administrative/storage areas were constructed. In the Isin-Larse period, early in the 2nd millennium BC, a large palace was built. Tell Yelkhi then continued in an administrative role into the Old Babylonian period with evidence of Mitanni influence. After a time of abandonment, it was resettled under the Kassites, at which time a large palace was built. Afterward, the site was permanently abandoned.

== Tell Zubeidi ==
The site (also Tell Subeidi), which lies a few hundred meters from Tell Yelkhi and Tell Kesaran, was excavated for two seasons in 1979 and 1980 by a German Archaeological Institute team led by R. M. Boehmer and H.-W. Dammer as part of the Hamrin Dam rescue archaeology program. It was in the upper Diyala River region of northern Mesopotamia. It was a small, 100 meters by 100 meters with a height of 1.5 meters, rural settlement established in the 13th century BC and occupation extended into the 12th century BC. Two main building levels were found, each consisting of a single building. Thirty five Kassite period graves were excavated, the 2nd most found after Babylon. It has been suggested that the ancient name of the site was Zaddi/Zaddu. Though inundated by the filling of the Hamrin Dam the site occasionally emerges from the water.

Cuneiform tablets were found which contained the names of Kassite rulers Kadašman-Enlil II, Kudur-Enlil, Šagarakti-šuriaš, Kaštiliašu IV, and Enlil-nādin-šumi. The tablets are held at the National Museum of Iraq in Baghdad. Several blank tablets were discovered suggesting there was a scribal center at the site. A few cylinder seals were found in Kassite graves as well as metal daggers.

== See also ==
- Cities of the ancient Near East
- Chronology of the ancient Near East
