= Ubaid house =

The Ubaid house is a dwelling used by the Ubaid culture of the Neolithic era. It is the predecessor of the Ubaid temple as well as Sumerian domestic and temple architecture. An example of this house type has been excavated at Tell Rashid in Iraq.
