= ICAANE =

The International Congress on the Archaeology of the Ancient Near East (ICAANE) is a biennial conference cycle initiated by archaeologists from several European universities. The first ICAANE took place in Rome in 1998. Since then the congress has been held every other spring at a different European university. The host of each ICAANE is chosen two years in advance by the ICAANE Scientific Committee. In 2018, in Munich, the decision of arranging the next congress was taken and the University of Bologna was chosen as the host of the 12 ICAANE. This event was subsequently delayed to 2021 as a result of the COVID-19 crisis.

== List of all ICAANE conferences ==
Year	Country	Organizers
1998	Italy	Sapienza University of Rome
2000	Denmark	University of Copenhagen
2002	France	University of Paris 1 Pantheon-Sorbonne
2004	Germany	Free University of Berlin
2006	Spain	Autonomous University of Madrid
2008	Italy	Sapienza University of Rome
2010	United Kingdom	University College London and The British Museum
2012	Poland	University of Warsaw and Kazimierz Michałowski Foundation
2014	Switzerland	University of Basel
2016	Austria	Austrian Academy of Sciences
2018	Germany	LMU Munich
2021	Italy	University of Bologna
2023	Denmark	University of Copenhagen
2025	France	Lumière University Lyon 2
2027	Georgia	Tbilisi State University

== 8 ICAANE Warsaw 2012 ==
On April 30 – May 4, 2012 the 8 ICAANE took place in Warsaw. It was organized by the Polish Centre of Mediterranean Archaeology of the University of Warsaw, Institute of Archaeology of the University of Warsaw and the Kazimierz Michałowski Foundation. The congress was attended by nearly 1000 participants who delivered 450 speeches. The media patronage of the 8 ICAANE was undertaken by the National Geographic Polska. The 8 ICAANE Warsaw Organizing Committee also obtained honorary patronages of the President of the Republic of Poland, Bronisław Komorowski, the Minister of Science and Higher Education, Prof. Barbara Kudrycka, and the Minister of Foreign Affairs, Radosław Sikorski.
