= Qumayra =

Qumayra قميرا
- Locality
- Location in Oman
- Coordinates: 23°56′2″N 56°11′58″E
- Country: Oman
- Governorate: Ad Dhahirah
- Province: Dhank

Area
  - Total: 1.927 km^{2} (0.744 sq mi)

Population (2020)
  - Total: 387
  - Density: 200.8/km^{2} (520/sq mi)
- Time zone: UTC+4 (Gulf Standard Timezone)
- Area code: 100340423

Qumayra (Arabic: قميرا) is a locality in Dhank Province, Ad Dhahirah Governorate, Oman. Qumayra has two mosques, a school, a community center and 49 other buildings. Qumayra also has four roads, one connecting Qumayra to the main highway system and one cul-de-sac leading into the Al Hajar Mountains. Qumayra has a nearby mountain with the same name called Lujmat Qumayrā.

Alternative names for Qumayra are Qumayrah, Qumayrā, Qymra.

Qumayra has a BWh hot desert climate.

Qumayra's region also has architecturally unique tombs and stone formations from the early bronze age.

== Demographics ==
Qumayra's population has increased from 303 in 2003 to 311 in 2010 to 387 in 2020. Qumayra's population structure is made up of 214 males and 173 females (55.3% to 44.7%), 100 people aged under 14, 274 between 15 and 64 and 13 over 65 (25.8% to 70.8% to 3.4%). 342 people in Qumayra are of Omani ethnicity and 45 are not. The table below is the age structure of Qumayra's population.

0-9 years	73
10-19 years	64
20-29 years	107
30-39 years	58
40-49 years	34
50-59 years	25
60-69 years	19
70-79 years	4
80+ years	3
