= Tell Rashid =

- Location within Iraq
- 34°02′N 45°10′E
- Type: tell
- Periods: Ubaid period
- Location: Iraq
- Region: Diyala Governorate

Site notes
- Height: 2.5 metre
- Length: 54 metre
- Width: 30 metre
- Excavation dates: 1978
- Archaeologists: Sabah Abboud Jasim

Tell Rashid is a tell, or archaeological settlement mound, in Diyala Governorate, Iraq. The site lies in the foothills of the Zagros Mountains, some 12 km (7.5 mi) south of Tell Abada, another Ubaid period site. It measures 54 by 30 m and extends 2.5 m above the surrounding plain. Tell Rashid was excavated for a single season in 1978 under the direction of Sabah Abboud Jasim as part of the archaeological salvage work being done for the construction of the Hemrin Dam. The excavation trench reached a depth of 5 m, at which point virgin soil (undisturbed by human activity) was reached. Four different occupation levels were recognised, all dating to the Ubaid period.

== Occupation history ==
The oldest level, IV, consists of some mudbrick foundations that were part of a larger building that extended beyond the excavated area. Based on the ceramics, the level could be dated to Ubaid 2. Level III yielded significant architectural remains, consisting of at least three separate buildings. Two of these were examples of the typical tripartite Ubaid house with a central hall or courtyard with smaller rooms on either long side. One of the buildings contained two child burials. The smaller of these two buildings had a facade adorned with buttresses, suggesting that this building may have had a special purpose, for example, as a guest house. In level II, parts of a single building with several rooms were excavated. The youngest level I was severely damaged and only some wall fragments and hearths were found.

== Material culture ==
Artefacts recovered from the excavation included clay animal figurines and spindle whorls, undefined tokens, and sling bullets. Small cones found at the site have been interpreted as labrets. Stone blades were also found, some of which still had pieces of bitumen sticking to them, indicating that they were probably inserted in a wooden shaft, for example, to create a sickle. Recovered pottery consisted mostly of painted, incised, or impressed ware and could be dated to the Ubaid 2-3 periods. Parallels for the so-called Fine Painted Ware at Tell Rashid have been found as far away as Yumuktepe in Turkey.

== See also ==
- Cities of the ancient Near East
- Tell Saadiya
- Tell Yelkhi
- Tell Suleimah
