= Michael Roaf =

British Assyriologist

Michael Douglas Roaf (born 20 May 1947) is a British archaeologist specialising in ancient Iranian studies and Assyriology.

Roaf studied the archaeology of Western Asia at University College London, and wrote his doctoral thesis, Sculptures and Sculptors at Persepolis (published 1983) at the University of Oxford. From 1981 to 1985 he was the director of the British School of Archaeology in Iraq. He also taught at the University of California, Berkeley, and is currently Professor of Near Eastern Archaeology at LMU Munich.

Roaf has conducted fieldwork in Iran, Iraq, Turkey and Bahrain. In Iran, he dug at Tepe Nush-i Jan under the direction of David Stronach, with whom he wrote Nush-i Jan I. The Major Buildings of the Median Settlement. With the LMU Munich team, he has recently worked on the archaeological expeditions at Gircano and Ziyaret Tepe, ancient Tushhan, Turkey.

== Works ==
- Sculptures and Sculptors at Persepolis (1983) - doctoral thesis. Published in full in Iran: Journal of the British Institute of Persian Studies vol. XXI, 1983.
- The Cultural Atlas of Mesopotamia and the Ancient Near East (1990) - divulgation.
- Continuity of Empire (?): Assyria, Media, Persia (2003) - Proceedings of the International Meeting held in Padova, 2001; ed. with Giovanni B. Lanfranchi and Robert Rollinger.
