= Hamrin Mountains =

Mountain in Iraq

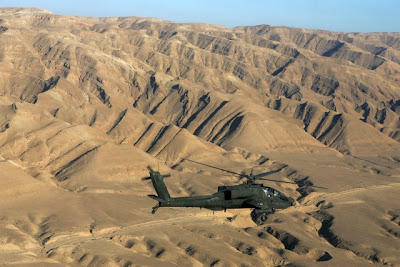
- View over Hamrin mountains

Highest point
- Elevation: 250–1,000 m (820–3,280 ft)
- Coordinates: 35.0325°N 43.6463889°E

Geography
- Location within Iraq
- Location: Iraq
- Parent range: Zagros Mountains

Geology
- Mountain type: Anticlinal fold

The Hamrin Mountains (Arabic: جبل حمرين, romanized: Jabāl Hamrīn, Kurdish: چیای حەمرین, romanized: Çiyayê Hemrîn or Çiyayên Hemrîn) are a small mountain ridge in northeast Iraq. The westernmost ripple of the Zagros Mountains, the Hamrin mountains extend from the Diyala Governorate bordering Iran, northwest to the Tigris river, crossing northern Saladin Governorate and southern Kirkuk Governorate. Kurds regard the Hamrin Mountains as the traditional southern boundary of Iraqi Kurdistan.

== Name ==
Historically the Hamrin Mountains were called Barima, Bārimā and Birimma (Arabic: جبل بارِمّا, romanized: Jabāl Bārimā). Ibn Khaldun, a 14th-century historian called the Hamrin mountains range, the "Kurdish mountains". That is because these mountains are situated in the south of Kirkuk and Kurds lived there, so, Ibn Khaldun said, "the range Hamrin mountains is a place whose people are Kurdish."
