= Polish Centre of Mediterranean Archaeology University of Warsaw =

Research institute of the University of Warsaw

- Centrum Archeologii Śródziemnomorskiej im. Kazimierza Michałowskiego
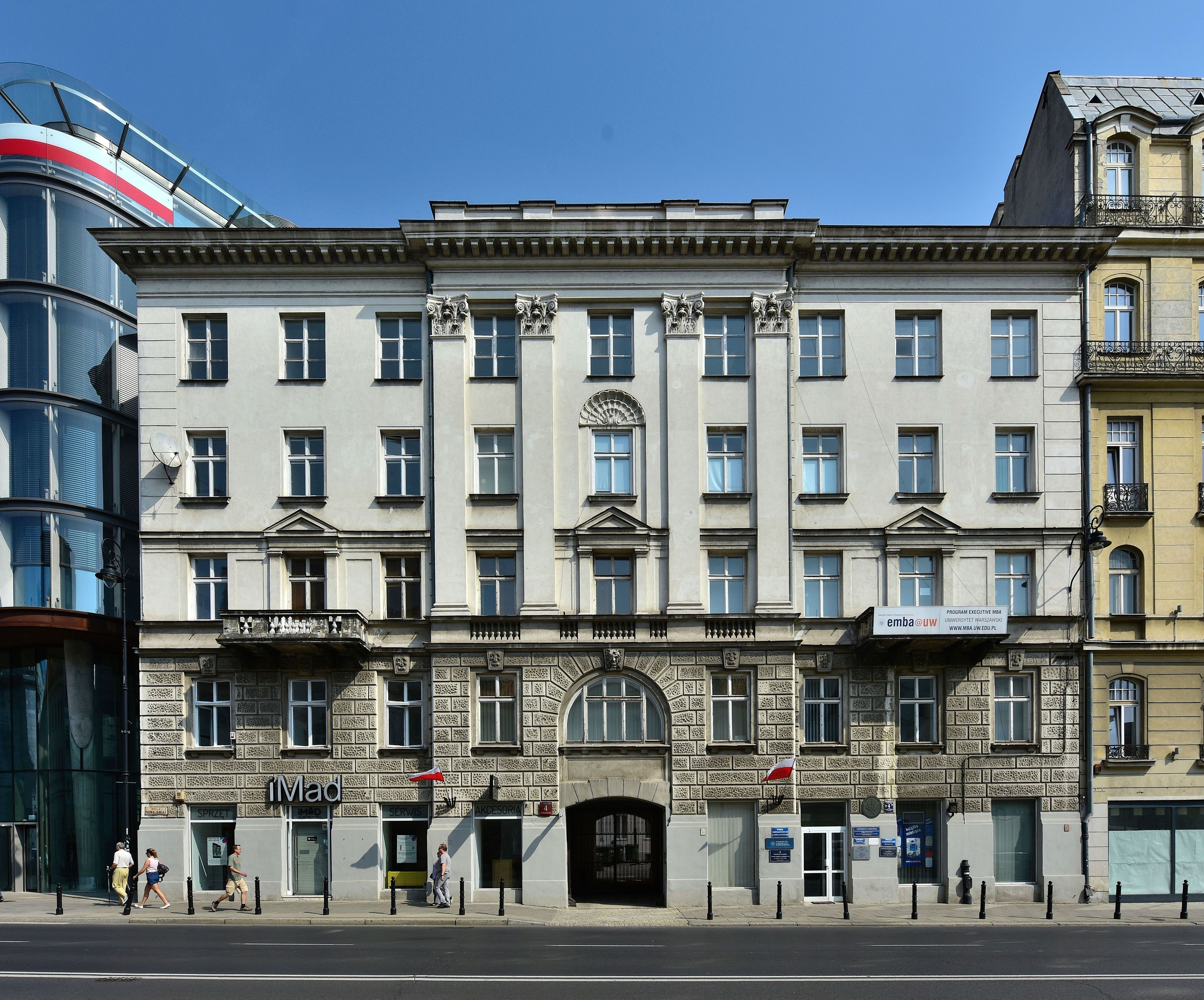
- Affiliations: University of Warsaw
- Director: dr Artur Obłuski
- Location: Warsaw, Poland; 52.2301°N 21.0222°E
- Website: www.pcma.uw.edu.pl

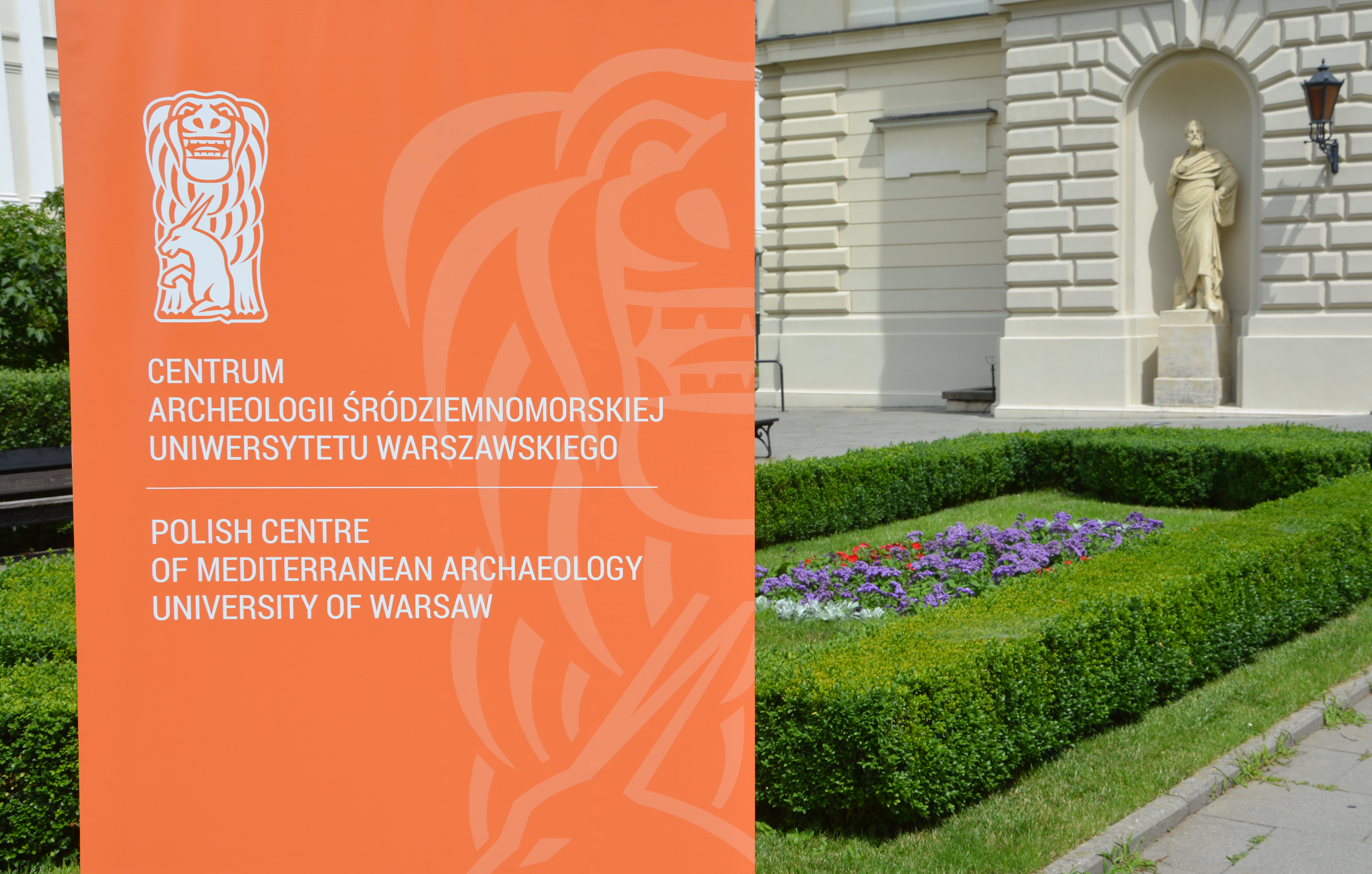
Polish Centre of Mediterranean Archaeology University of Warsaw, logo

The Polish Centre of Mediterranean Archaeology University of Warsaw (PCMA UW; Polish: Centrum Archeologii Śródziemnomorskiej UW im. Kazimierza Michałowskiego) operates as an independent research institute of the University of Warsaw under the present name since 1990. It is dedicated to organizing, implementing and coordinating archaeological research, both excavations and study projects, as well as conservation, reconstruction and restoration projects, in northeastern Africa, the Near East and Cyprus. Projects include sites covering a broad chronological spectrum from the dawn of civilization (prehistoric times) through all the historic periods of the ancient Mediterranean civilizations to Late Antiquity and early Islam. Tasks beside fieldwork include comprehensive documentation of finds, archives management and publication of the results in keeping with international research standards. The PCMA manages the Research Centre in Cairo and Polish Archaeological Unit in Khartoum.

== History ==
The PCMA draws on the pioneering archaeological work of Polish archaeologist and egyptologist Prof. Kazimierz Michałowski. It is the direct continuator, since 1990, of the Research Centre in Cairo, Polish Centre of Mediterranean Archaeology University of Warsaw, which Michałowski established in 1959. It was the first Polish institution dedicated to archaeological research in the Nile Valley.

== Publications ==
The PCMA publishes the results of its excavation and restoration projects in an annual journal and a series of monographs.

=== Polish Archaeology in the Mediterranean ===
Polish Archaeology in the Mediterranean
- Discipline: Archaeology
- Language: English

Publication details
- History: 1990–present
- Publisher: University of Warsaw Press, on behalf of the Polish Centre of Mediterranean Archaeology University of Warsaw
- Frequency: Annual
- Open access: Yes

Standard abbreviations
- ISO 4: Pol. Archaeol. Mediterr.

Indexing
- ISSN: 1234-5415 (print); 2083-537X (web)

Links
- Journal homepage

Polish Archeology in the Mediterranean is an annual open access academic journal published by the PCMA since 1990. Since 2007 it has published it jointly with the University of Warsaw Press. Initially, it published the results of work by Polish archaeologists working with PCMA UW expeditions in the Mediterranean region (in Egypt, Syria, Iraq, and Cyprus). Over time, it evolved into a fully peer-reviewed journal with an extended subject area. The territorial scope covers the broadly understood Middle East and North Africa region, including the Arabian Peninsula and the Caucasus. The chronological range covers periods from prehistory through all historical periods to the Late Islamic period. Since 2013, additional thematic fascicles on specific topics have been published occasionally.

=== Studia Palmyreńskie ===
Studia Palmyreńskie
- Language: Polish, English, French, German
- Edited by: Grzegorz Majcherek

Publication details
- History: 1966–2014; continued as a book series
- Publisher: University of Warsaw Press, on behalf of the Polish Centre of Mediterranean Archaeology University of Warsaw
- Frequency: Annual
- Open access: Yes

Standard abbreviations
- ISO 4: Stud. Palmyr.

Indexing
- ISSN: 0081-6787

Links
- Journal homepage

Studia Palmyreńskie is book series published by the PCMA, together with the University of Warsaw Press (except volumes X and XI), presenting the results of archaeological research in Palmyra. It has been published since 1966 and was originally a journal, converting to a monograph series in 2014. The thematic scope of the title, apart from archaeological discoveries, also includes the history of the city, its religions, art and epigraphy.

The journal’s founder and first editor-in-chief was Kazimierz Michałowski. Since 1985 it was edited by Michał Gawlikowski. Since its transformation in 2014, the editor of the series is Grzegorz Majcherek.

The journal begun as a publication for young explorers but quickly grew into a proper academic outlet. In 1974 the journal has been described as "unique" and the only journal with that specific focus.

=== Other series ===
- PAM Monograph Series
- PAM Supplement Series
- PCMA Excavation Series
- PCMA Archaeological Guides

== Conferences ==
The PCMA UW is a joint organizer of the annual "Poles on the Nile" and "Poles on the Near East" conferences, presenting the results of excavations carried out by Polish teams. The PCMA UW co-organized a number of prominent international conferences, including the "11th International Conference of Nubian Studies" in 2006, the " 8th International Congress of the Archaeology of the Ancient Near East" in 2012, and the "Red Sea 8" in 2017.
