= Lower Mesopotamia =

Region between Euphrates and Tigris

Lower Mesopotamia بلاد الرافدين السفلى (Arabic)
- Historical region
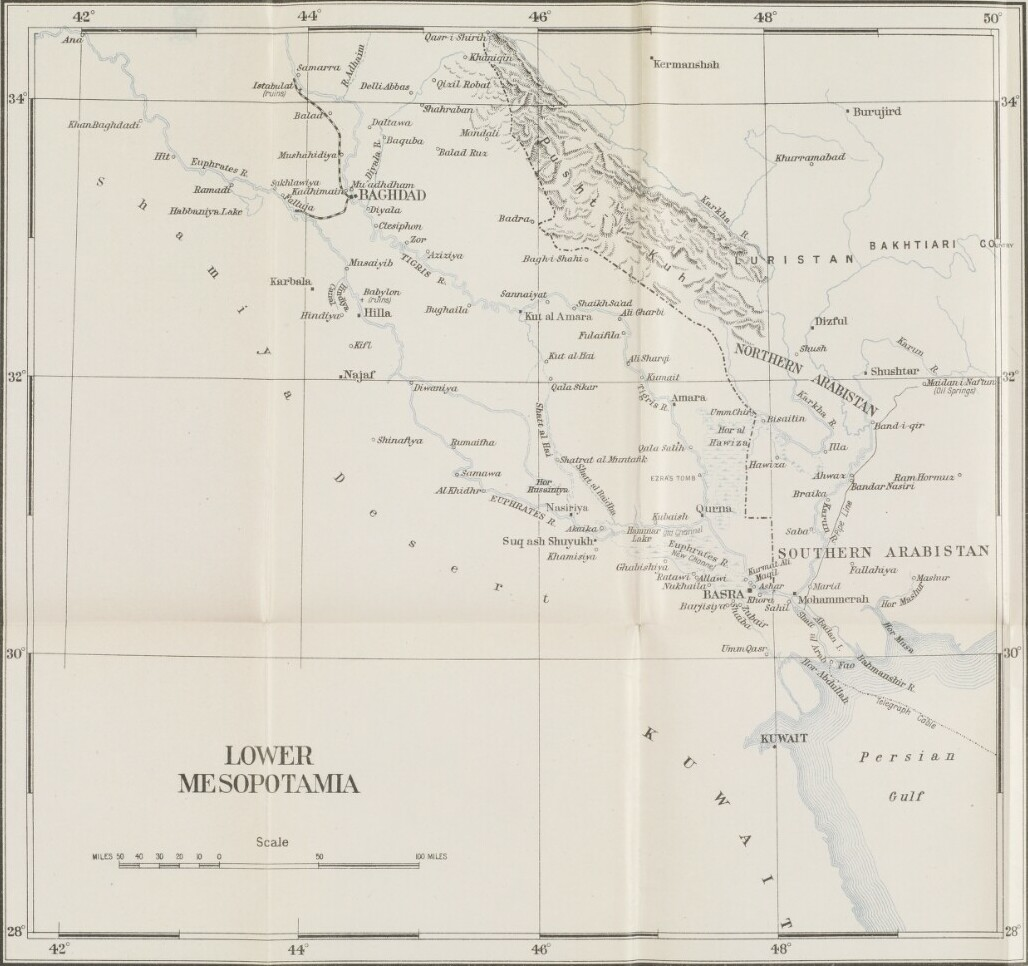
- A map of Lower Mesopotamia from 1924
- Countries: Iraq; Kuwait; Iran

Lower Mesopotamia is a historical region of Mesopotamia. It is located in the alluvial plain of Iraq from the Hamrin Mountains to the Faw Peninsula near the Persian Gulf.

In the Middle Ages it was also known as the Sawad and al-Jazira al-sflia ("Lower Jazira"), which strictly speaking designated only the southern alluvial plain, and Arab Iraq, as opposed to Persian Iraq, the Jibal. Lower Mesopotamia was home to Sumer and Babylonia.

== Delimitation ==
The medieval Arab geographers placed the northern border between Iraq and Upper Mesopotamia (the Jazirah) in a line running from Anbar on the Euphrates to Tikrit on the Tigris, although later it was shifted to a line running due west from Tikrit, thus including several towns on the Euphrates past Anbar into Iraq.

== Geography ==
An alluvial plain begins north of Tikrit Near Hamrin Mountains and extends to the Persian Gulf. Here the Tigris and Euphrates lie above the level of the plain in many places, and the whole area is a river delta interlaced by the channels of the two rivers and by qanat. Intermittent lakes, fed by the rivers in flood, also characterize southeastern Iraq. A fairly large area (15,000 km^{2} or 5,800 mi^{2}) just above the confluence of the two rivers at al Qurnah and extending east of the Tigris beyond the Iranian border is marshland, known as Lake Hammar, the result of centuries of flooding and inadequate drainage. Much of it is permanent marsh, but some parts dry out in early winter, and other parts become marshland only in years of great flood.

Because the waters of the Tigris and Euphrates above their confluence are heavily silt-laden, irrigation and fairly frequent flooding deposit large quantities of silty loam in much of the delta area. Windborne silt contributes to the total deposit of sediments. It has been estimated that the delta plains are built up at the rate of nearly twenty centimeters in a century. In some areas, major floods lead to the deposit in temporary lakes of as much as thirty centimeters of mud.

The Tigris and Euphrates also carry large quantities of salts. These, too, are spread on the land by sometimes excessive irrigation and flooding. A high water table and poor surface and subsurface drainage tend to concentrate the salts near the surface of the soil. In general, the salinity of the soil increases from Baghdad south to the Persian Gulf and severely limits productivity in the region south of Amarah. The salinity is reflected in the large lake in central Iraq, southwest of Baghdad, known as Lake Milh. There are two other major lakes in the country to the north of Lake Milh: Lake Tharthar and Lake Habbaniyah.

== See also ==
- List of Umayyad governors of Iraq

== Sources ==
- Le Strange, Guy (1905). The Lands of the Eastern Caliphate: Mesopotamia, Persia, and Central Asia, from the Moslem Conquest to the Time of Timur. Cambridge: Cambridge University Press.
