= RAF Habbaniya =

Former Royal Air Force station in Iraq (1936–1959)

RAF Habbaniya
- قاعدة الحبانية الجوية (Arabic: Of the oleander)
- Habbaniya in Iraq
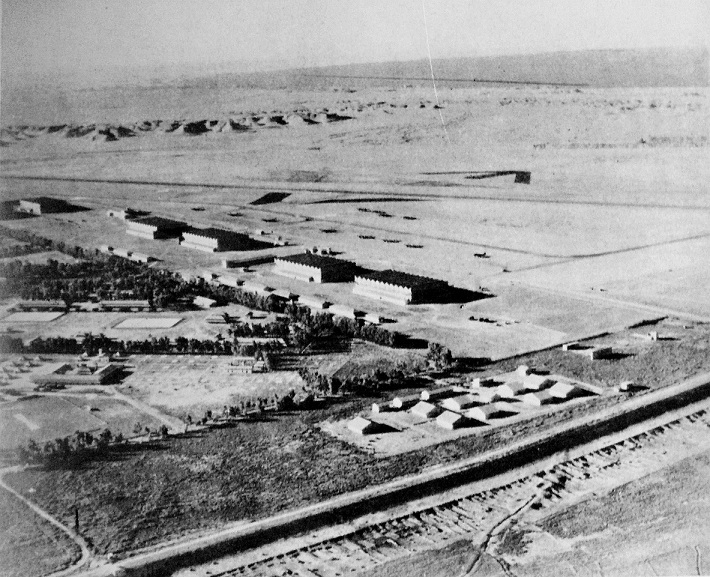
- Habbaniya airfield, circa 1941

- Station badge (Infestos ferimus Latin: We strike the troublesome)

Site information
- Type: Flying station
- Owner: Air Ministry
- Operator: Royal Air Force
- Controlled by: RAF Iraq Command

Location
- Location within Iraq
- Coordinates: 33°22′56.99″N 43°34′23.71″E

Site history
- Built: 1934
- In use: 1936–1959

Garrison information
- Past commanders: H H Brookes (1954–1956); Hughie Edwards (1956–58)

Airfield information
Runways
| Direction | Length and surface |
|---|---|
| | 2,000 yards (1,829 m) |

Royal Air Force Habbaniya, more commonly known as RAF Habbaniya (Arabic: قاعدة الحبانية الجوية) (originally RAF Dhibban) was a Royal Air Force station at Habbaniyah, about 55 miles (89 km) west of Baghdad in modern-day Iraq, on the banks of the Euphrates near Lake Habbaniyah. It was developed from 1934, and was operational from October 1936 until 31 May 1959 when the RAF finally withdrew after the July 1958 Revolution made the British military presence no longer welcome. It was the scene of fierce fighting in May 1941 when it was besieged by the Iraqi Military following the 1941 Iraqi coup d'état.

It is currently a major Iraqi military airbase.

== History ==
Originally called RAF Dhibban, the station was built on the west bank of the Euphrates in the then Hashemite Kingdom of Iraq at a cost of £1,750,000 (equivalent to £106,934,107 in 2025), and opened on 19 October 1936. It was the British Royal Air Force (RAF) base built "West of the Euphrates" in accordance with Article 5 of the Anglo-Iraqi Treaty of 1930. It was on the West bank of the Euphrates, between Ramadi and Fallujah, and was a major military and air base for the entire British Empire. The squadrons, units and headquarters and the hospital gradually moved in from RAF Hinaidi, Baghdad, which was then finally vacated by the British on 21 December 1937 and renamed "Rashid Airfield" by the Iraqis. RAF Dhibban was originally named after the nearby village of Sin el Dhibban, in Arabic "Teeth of the Fly", but was renamed, more appropriately, RAF Habbaniya on 1 May 1938. Not long after its renaming, an aircraft went missing on a flight from Habbaniya. The aircraft, a bomber of No. 30 Squadron, left on 10 December 1938, and was found 11 days later some 60 miles (97 km) north of Habbaniya. All six occupants were dead.

RAF Habbaniya was extensive and, as well as the airfield, included the Air Headquarters of RAF Iraq Command, communication facilities, maintenance units, an aircraft depot, an RAF hospital, RAF Iraq Levies barracks, the RAF Armoured Car Company depot as well as fuel and bomb stores.

There were numerous billets, messes and a wide range of leisure facilities including swimming pools, cinemas and theatres, sports pitches, tennis courts and riding stables. It was self-contained with its own power station, water purification plant and sewage farm. Water taken from the Euphrates for the irrigation systems enabled green lawns, flower beds and even ornamental botanical gardens. After the Second World War the families of British personnel started living at Habbaniya and a school was started.

Within the camp perimeter was the civil cantonment which provided the accommodation for the families of the RAF Iraq Levies and the civilian workers and their families. The cantonment population of about 10,000 had their own schools, hospital, mosques, churches, temples, cinema and bazaars. The base had extended to some 28 square miles (73 km^{2}), which required a taxi service to get people around. Just outside the perimeter was the village of Humphreya in which more locally employed civilians and their families lived. It was the original construction camp for the company which built the base, Messrs Humphreys of Knightsbridge, London (and from which the name Humphreya arose).

There was a 7-mile (11 km) perimeter fence round the base but this did not enclose the airfield which was outside. In 1952 a second airfield was built on the plateau to cope with the long range and jet aircraft using the base (this subsequently became the Iraqi Air Force Al Taqaddum airbase).

In the late 1930s, Imperial Airways established a staging post on Lake Habbaniya for the flying boat service from the UK to British India using Short Empires. The lake provided the necessary landing area for these aircraft in the middle of the Mesopotamian desert.

Map of Iraq during the Second World War.

The station was a large flying training school in the Second World War, as well as a transport staging airfield. In the Rashid Ali rebellion in 1941, the airfield was besieged by units from the Royal Iraqi Army encamped on the overlooking plateau. On 2 May 1941, British forces from the airfield launched pre-emptive airstrikes on Iraqi forces throughout Iraq and the Anglo-Iraqi War began. The siege was lifted by the units based at Habbaniya, including pilots from the training school, a battalion of the King's Own Royal Regiment flown in at the last moment, Number 1 Armoured Car Company RAF and the RAF's Iraq Levies. The subsequent arrival of a relief column (Kingcol), part of Habforce sent from Palestine, then a British mandate, combined with the Habbaniya units to force the rebel forces to retreat to Baghdad.

Later in the Second World War, Habbaniya became an important stage on the southern air route between the UK and the USSR. British Overseas Airways Corporation (BOAC) ran a regular passenger service via North Africa and the Middle East using Consolidated Liberator transports. The United States Army Air Forces Air Transport Command used Habbaniya as a stopover point between the large Lend-Lease aircraft assembly facility at Abadan Airport, Iran, and Payne Field, Cairo. Also ATC operated a transport route from Habbaniya to Mehrabad Airport, Tehran. After the Second World War, BOAC discontinued the flying boat service. and the hotel buildings at the lake were acquired by the RAF and used as a Rest and Recreation Centre. In 1949, Habbaniya was assessed as having six hangars and two metalled runways, the longer being 2,000 yards (1,800 m) in length.

No. 6 Squadron RAF, No. 8 Squadron RAF and No. 73 Squadron RAF were the last flying squadrons to depart the base in the mid-1950s. Although the British presence continued until 1959, on 2 May 1955, command of the base was handed over to the Iraqi government.

During the Cold War, from 1 August 1946, GCHQ ran a large signals intelligence (SIGINT) monitoring station at Habbaniya staffed by 276 Signals Unit until 31 July 1958. It also operated SIGINT aircraft over Iran and the Caspian Sea to monitor the Soviet Union.

On 14 July 1958, the July 1958 Revolution took place, which brought down the Hashemite Kingdom of Iraq. At that time Habbaniya had 900 personnel. The uprising in Baghdad caused the loss of one British life and the burning of the embassy. By the start of 1959, the base was host to 600 RAF staff with 60 dependants. The dependants were flown back to the United Kingdom in early April 1959. The base closed on 31 May 1959 when the RAF finally withdrew, after the July 1958 Revolution had made the presence of British military no longer welcome. On abandonment of the base, a question was asked in the UK Parliament concerning the cost of the base over the 23 years of its operational life. It was estimated that it had the amount was £3.5 million (equivalent to £70,803,115 in 2025).

In June 1961 there were two Iraqi Air Force squadrons at the base:

- No.1 Squadron, Venom FB.1, based at Habbaniyah AB, CO Capt. A.-Mun’em Ismaeel
- No.6 Squadron, Hunter, based at Habbaniyah AB, CO Capt. Hamid Shaban

The airbase was bombed by the Islamic Republic of Iran Air Force in Operation Kaman 99 on the second day of the Iran–Iraq War, just after the Iraqi invasion of Iran.

Tom Cooper's book Arab MiG-19 and MiG-21 Units in Combat describes Habbaniya as a base for Mikoyan-Gurevich MiG-21s by 1990.

=== RAF Hospital Habbaniya ===
As part of the treaty of 1930, the RAF were required to withdraw from Hinaidi and Mosul, so the hospital at Hinaidi was also relocated to Habbaniya in 1937 with 500 beds. Sometimes referred to as No. 6 RAF Hospital, it operated as a general hospital until 1956, being downgraded to a station hospital until 1958. In 1942, the commanding officer of the hospital, Group Captain Gerard Hanly, was killed in an aircraft crash.

== Current use ==
According to the Federation of American Scientists the site was used to produce Mustard gas (a chemical weapon). The production site was built in 1983–84 and provided the gas used in the Iran–Iraq War. The factory produced 60–80 tonnes per year. Alwan Hassoun Alwan al-Abousi was Base Commander 1985–1988.

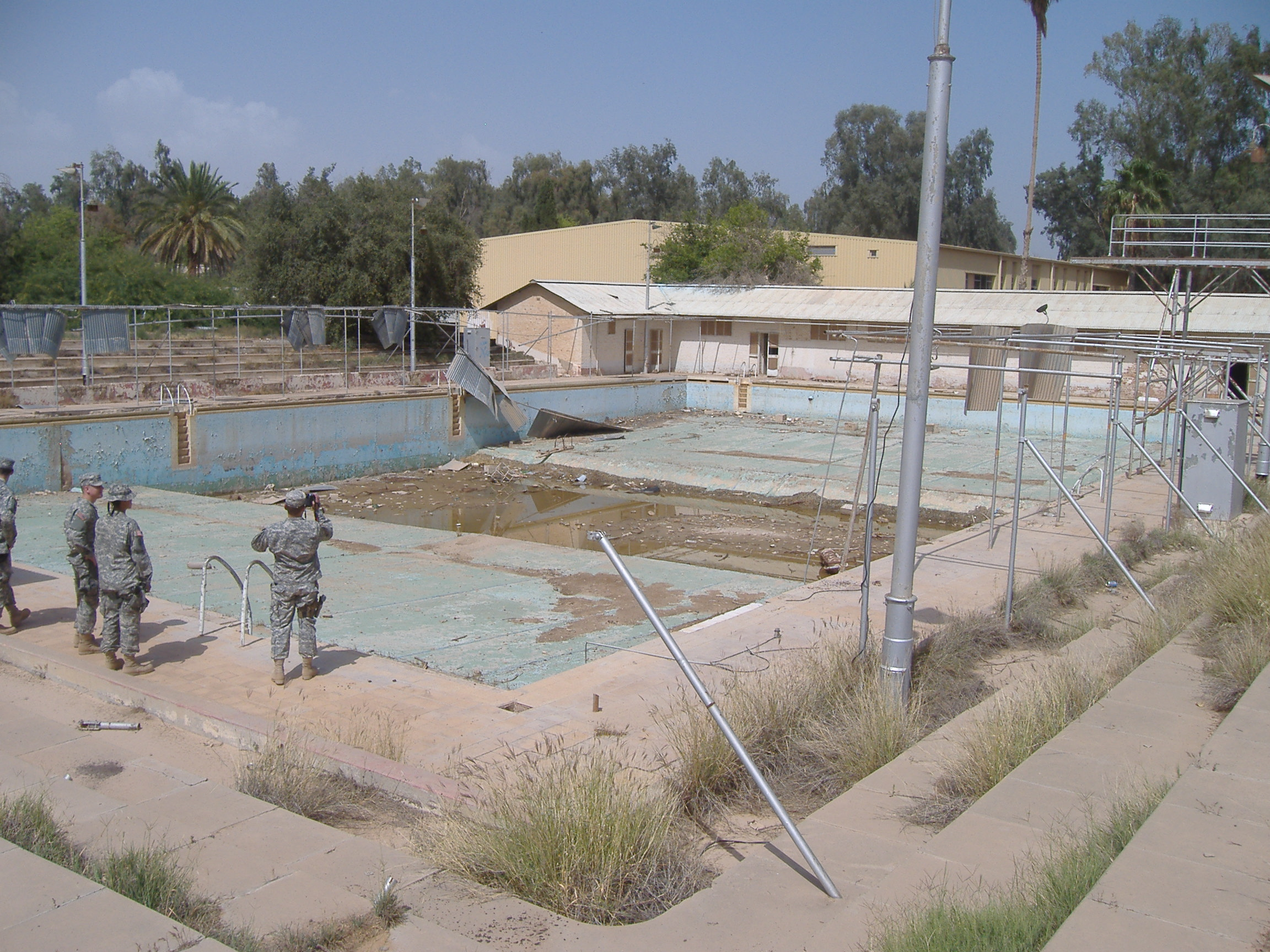
May 2007 view of the then derelict Habbaniyah Olympic pool

After 2003, the former British airfield was used by both the United States Armed Forces and the New Iraqi Army as a forward operating base, and is now known as Camp Habbaniyah. From this outpost, combat operations are run from the outskirts of Fallujah to the outskirts of Ramadi. Since 2006, Camp Habbaniyah has grown into a Regional Training and Regional Support Center as well as the headquarters for the Iraqi Army 1st Division. Ongoing Coalition and Iraqi construction projects have revitalised much of the base.

In December 2008, the U.S. Army and all civilian contractors, including less than twelve contractors from MPRI, departed Camp Habbaniyah. U.S. Marines had stayed behind to provide the Iraqi Army with additional perimeter security until a time TBD.

On 16 April 2009, a suicide-bomber dressed as an Iraqi 1st Lieutenant detonated a bomb among a group of Iraqi soldiers at a canteen.

In 2015, Habbaniya was a base for Shia militias, the Iraqi Army and its American trainers, in their ongoing campaign against ISIS.

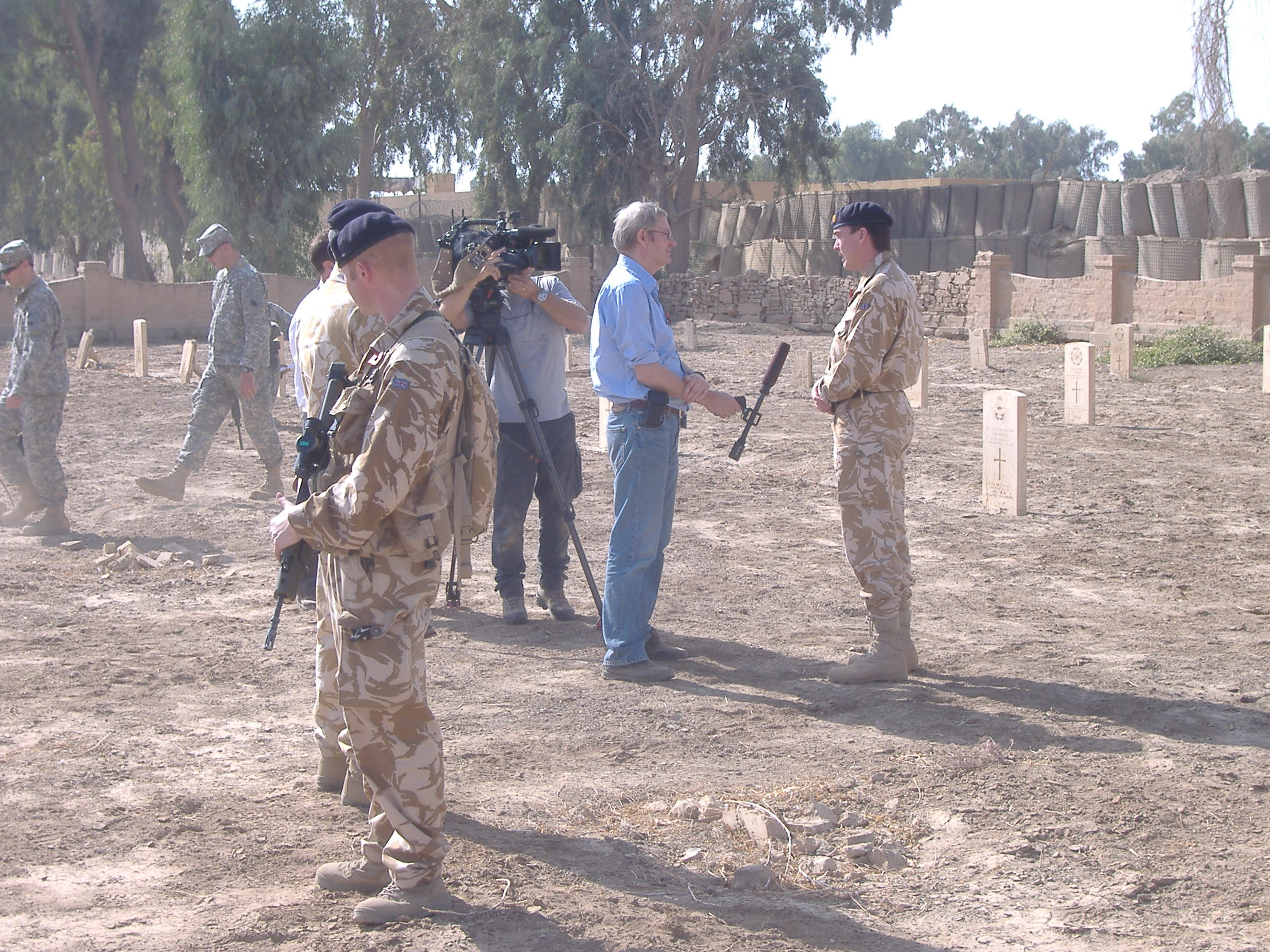
British media and service members make a brief visit to the cemetery for Remembrance Day ceremonies, 2007

289 British and Commonwealth personnel, along with women, children and babies, remain buried in the Commonwealth War Graves Commission (CWGC) cemetery in Habbaniya. The register of those buried is held by the RAF Habbaniya Association. In 2019, the site was renovated and 289 replacement Portland stone grave markers were installed..

In addition to the 289 Commonwealth graves, there is also the grave of the only Norwegian serviceman known to have died in Iraq and been buried there. First Officer Oskar Kristiansen of the Norwegian Navy died of burns received during a fire on board the M/T Bralanta and was buried in the Habbaniya War Cemetery on the 26th March 1945. Due to severe erosion, the re-making of his grave was overlooked during the restoration of the cemetery, but this situation will be rectified in the near future..

Details of all 290 burials as well as individual photographs of every headstone at the Habbaniya War Cemetery, compiled since the completion of its restoration, are freely available for anyone who is interested..

== Notable personnel ==
- Michael Beetham, later Marshal of the Royal Air Force, served at Habbaniya in 1951 on detachment
- Hugh Hamilton Brookes, commanding officer, 1954–1956
- Roald Dahl was stationed there in 1940, as described in his book, Going Solo, but his opinion rather was unfavourable compared with that of most personnel who served there.
- Hughie Edwards, commanding officer, 1956–1958
- Jeremy Swan, was a medical officer at Habbaniya in the 1940s
- George Unwin, officer commanding No. 84 Squadron in 1949

== Flying Units and Aircraft ==
- No. 6 Squadron RAF (1950–1954) de Havilland Vampire FB5 & FB9
- No. 8 Squadron RAF (1956) de Havilland Vampire FB4
- No. 11 Squadron RAF (1941) Bristol Blenheim IV
- No. 14 Squadron RAF (1941) Bristol Blenheim IV
- No. 30 Squadron RAF (1938) Hawker Hardy, later Bristol Blenheim I
- No. 45 Squadron RAF (1941) Bristol Blenheim IV
- No. 52 Squadron RAF (1941–1942) Hawker Audax
- No. 55 Squadron RAF (1937–1939) Vickers Vincent Bristol Blenheim I
- No. 70 Squadron RAF (1937–1939) Vickers Valentia
- No. 73 Squadron RAF (1953–1955) de Havilland Vampire FB9 & FB1
- No. 74 Squadron RAF (1943) Hawker Hurricane I
- No. 82 Squadron RAF detachment (1951–1952) Avro Lancaster PR1
- No. 84 Squadron RAF (1941) Bristol Blenheim IV
- No. 94 Squadron RAF detachment (1941) Gloster Gladiator
- No. 123 Squadron RAF (1942) Gloster Gladiator
- No. 162 Squadron RAF (1942) Bristol Blenheim IV
- No. 185 Squadron RAF (1952) de Havilland Vampire FB5
- No. 203 Squadron RAF detachment (1941) Bristol Blenheim IV
- No. 208 Squadron RAF detachment (1941) Hawker Audax
- No. 216 Squadron RAF detachment (1942) Lockheed Hudson IV
- No. 223 Squadron RAF detachment (1942) Martin Baltimore
- [S' Squadron RAF Formed Habbaniya 1939 & re-designated No. 244 Squadron RAF on move to RAF Shaibah on 1 November 1940.
- No. 249 Squadron RAF (1946) de Havilland Mosquito FB26 Hawker Tempest F6
- No. 261 Squadron RAF (1941) Gloster Gladiator Hawker Hurricane I
- No. 651 Squadron RAF detachment (1948) Auster AOP6
- No. 680 Squadron RAF detachment (1945–1946) Fairchild Argus
- No. 683 Squadron RAF (1952–1953) Vickers Valetta C1
- No. 1415 (Meteorological Flight) RAF (1942–1946) Gloster Gladiator, Hawker Hurricane
- No. 1434 (Photo Survey) Flight RAF (1942) Bristol Blenheim
- No. 4 Flying Training School RAF (1939–1941)
- A Communications Flight (with various designations) was based at Habbaniya from 1936 until 1 April 1958.

== Ground Units ==
- No. 104 Maintenance Unit RAF (1954–1956)
- No. 134 Maintenance Unit RAF (1942 and 1943 to 1946)
- No. 115 Maintenance Unit RAF (1945 to 1958)
- No. 123 Signals Unit RAF (1 January 1956 to 31 October 1958)
- No. 276 Signals Unit RAF (1946–1958)
- 19 Topographical Squadron R.E.
- No. 1 Armoured Car Company RAF (1936–1946)
- Number 2 Squadron RAF Regiment (1948–1955)
- 1st Battalion King's Own Royal Regiment
- Iraq Levies, HQ, 1st, 2d,3d, 4th, and 5th Assyrian Levies and 8th Levy. All companies of 125 men plus their dependents totaling 2,000 people.
- RAF Hawker Hunter Servicing Flight/(Royal Iraqi Air Force) (1957–1958)
- RAF Hospital, Habbaniya (variously named; General Hospital, No.6 RAF Hospital, Station Hospital). Transferred from RAF Hinaidi December 1937.

== See also ==
- List of former Royal Air Force stations
- Article 5 of the Anglo-Iraqi Treaty
- Al Taqaddum
