= Battle for Mosul Dam =

2014 battle in Iraq

Coordinates: 36.6303°N 42.8231°E

- Part of the Northern Iraq offensive of the War in Iraq (2013–2017) and the American-led intervention in Iraq (2014–2021)
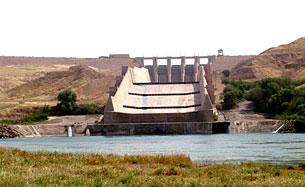
- Mosul Dam
Date	16–19 August 2014 (3 days)
Location	Mosul Dam; Nineveh Province, Iraq
Result	Mosul dam recaptured from IS

Belligerents
Iraq; Kurdistan Region Airstrikes: United States	Islamic State

Commanders and leaders
Unknown	Unknown

Strength
(Kurdistan Region) 500 (Iraq) 170	500

Casualties and losses
Unknown	11+ killed

The Battle for Mosul Dam took place in August 2014 between militants of the Islamic State (IS) and Iraqi Special Operations Forces and Kurdish Peshmerga, supported by U.S.-led Coalition airstrikes.

== Background ==
Mosul Dam was captured by IS militants on August 7, 2014, after Kurdish forces retreated from the area, following a series of battles in the region. Some American officials described the fall of the dam as a grave concern, because it could release a 20-metre (66 ft) wave of water if it was destroyed, threatening towns and cities downstream. Following these recent developments, Kurdish forces, Iraqi forces, and the U.S. Air Force launched a counter-offensive to retake the dam.

Also of grave concern was that Mosul Dam was constructed on evaporite rocks of the Miocene Fars (Fatha) Formation, which are water-soluble. As a result, the reservoir behind the dam was not filled to capacity. A continued regimen of pumping concrete grout into potential leaks meant that a long term interruption of remedial works could end in a reduction of structural integrity and disaster.

== Events ==
On August 16, the U.S. Air Force launched air strikes on IS positions near the dam, destroying some of their equipment. Kurdish forces also launched attacks against IS on the same day, shelling their positions near the dam, and opening up the possibility for a ground attack. A Kurdish commander, Major General Abdelrahman Korini, told AFP that Peshmerga forces had captured the eastern side of the dam and were "still advancing." Rudaw, a Kurdish news organization, said the airstrikes appeared to be the "heaviest U.S. bombing of militant positions since the start of airstrikes" against IS last week. At least 11 IS fighters were killed by the airstrikes.

On August 17, the fighting continued. Kurdish officials said that peshmerga forces captured three towns near the dam: Tel Skuf, Sharafiya and Batnaya. The U.S.-led coalition had until that day conducted nine airstrikes and destroyed or damaged four armoured personnel carriers, seven armed vehicles, two Humvees and an armoured vehicle. IS militants tried to slow down Kurdish forces with explosive devices, including homemade bombs and land mines.

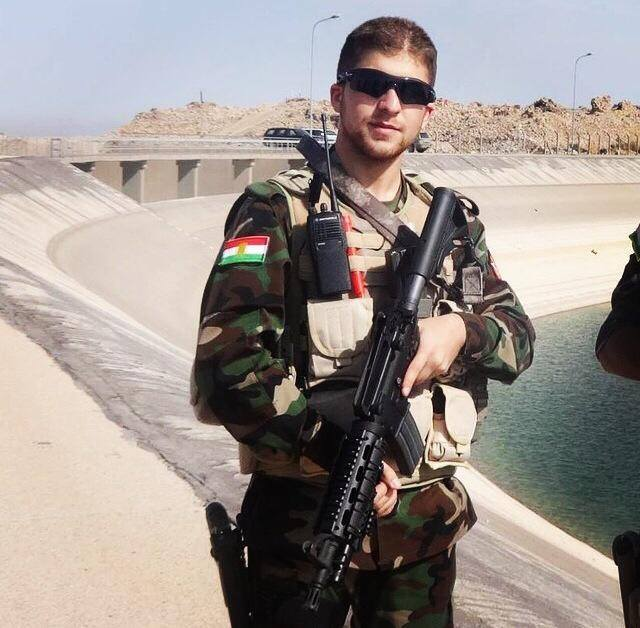
Peshmerga soldier at the dam of Mosul

On August 18, Iraqi and Kurdish forces said that they had taken full control of the dam. U.S. President Barack Obama also confirmed that the Mosul Dam was under complete Kurdish and Iraqi control. He also said that the move to recapture the Mosul Dam was a "major step forward" in the long-term strategy to defeat the militants. Journalists in the area reported that the fighting had not completely ended.

On August 19, the battle ended completely, with an Iraqi-Kurdish victory. BBC reporter Jim Muir, who had visited the dam, said it was "back in safe hands" and appeared intact.

== See also ==
- Tishrin Dam offensive
- Battle of Mosul (2016–2017)
- Battle of Tabqa
