= Lake Qadisiyah =

Lake in Al Anbar, Iraq

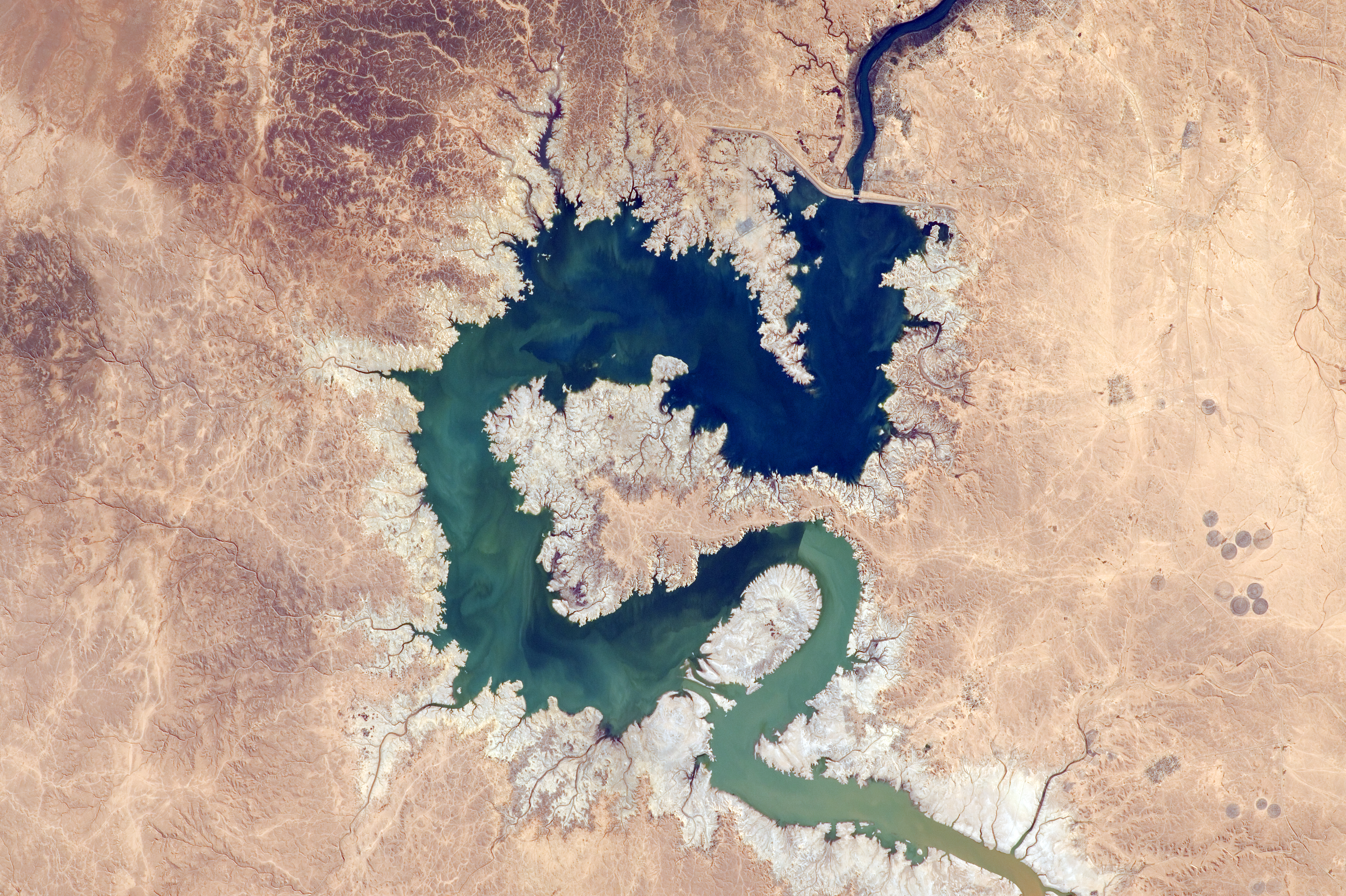
- Lake Qadisiyah, as seen from the International Space Station

- Location within Iraq
- Interactive map of Lake Qadisiyah
- Location: Al-Anbar, Iraq
- Coordinates: 34°18′32″N 42°14′20″E
- Type: reservoir
- Shore length^{1}: 100 kilometres (62 mi)
- ^{1} Shore length is not a well-defined measure.

A man-made reservoir in Al-Anbar, Iraq, Lake Qadisiyah (Arabic: بحيرة القادسية) sits on the north side of the Haditha Dam.

Qadisiyah was formed by the damming of the Euphrates river above Haditha, Iraq. It has 100 kilometres (62 mi) of shoreline and provides irrigation water for nearby cultivated fields.

On December 3, 2006, it was the site of an emergency landing by an American CH-46E Sea Knight helicopter from the 3rd Marine Aircraft Wing that resulted in the drowning deaths of four out of its sixteen passengers.

== See also ==
- Lake Tharthar
- Lake Habbaniyah
- Lake Milh
- Mosul Dam
- List of dams and reservoirs in Iraq
- Wildlife of Iraq
