= Lake Habbaniyah =

Lake in Iraq

- Location within Iraq
- Interactive map of Lake Habbaniyah
- Location: Al Anbar Governorate, Iraq
- Coordinates: 33°17′43″N 43°27′10″E
- Type: Reservoir (Artificial lake)
- Primary inflows: Euphrates River
- Primary outflows: Lake Milh
- Basin countries: Iraq
- Surface area: 140 km^{2} (54 sq mi)

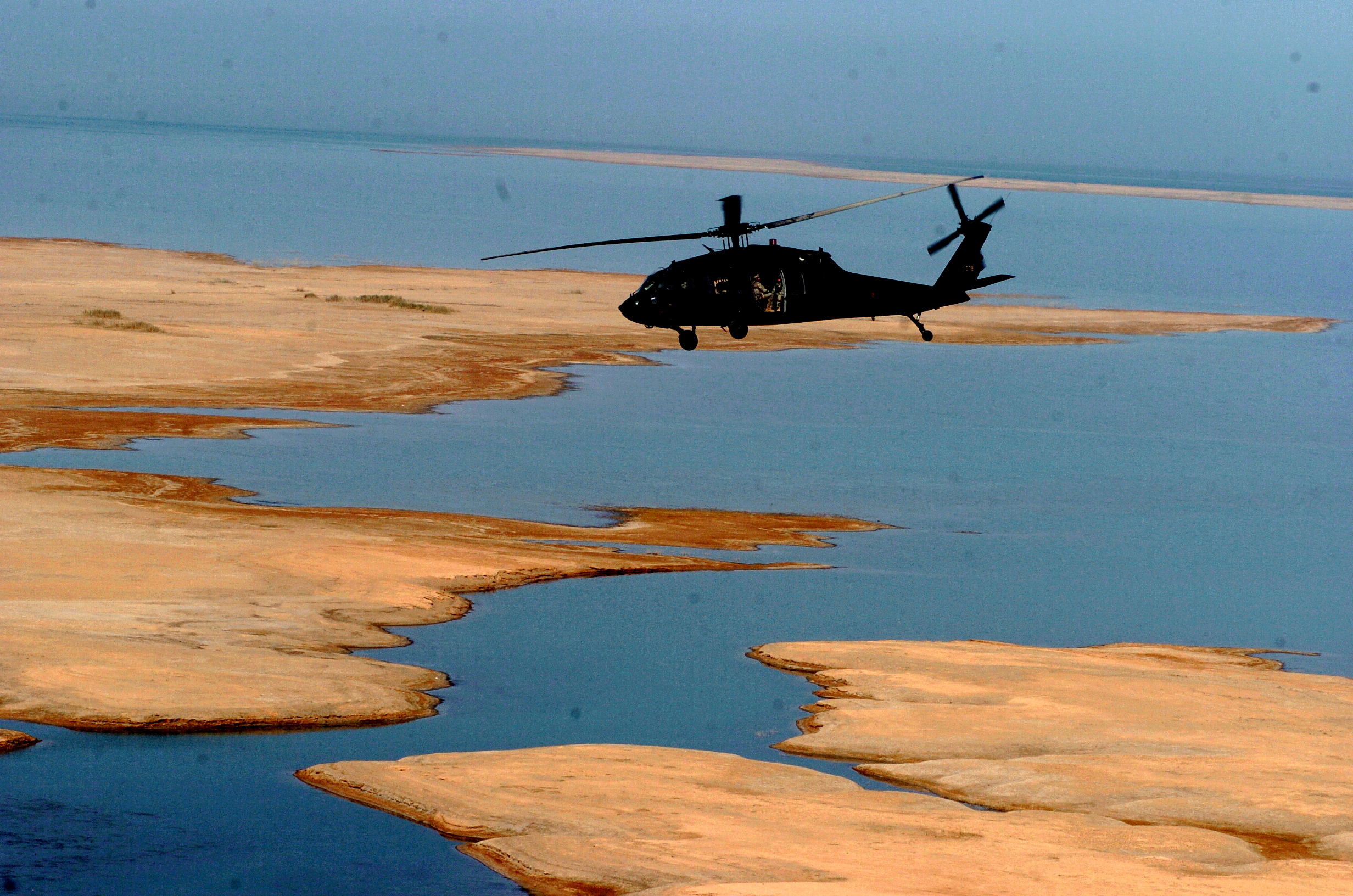
U.S. Army helicopter over Lake Habbaniyah, May 2008

Lake Habbaniyah (Arabic: بحيرة الحبانية Buḥayrat al-Ḥabbāniya) is a shallow artificial lake and reservoir located halfway between Ramadi and Fallujah near Al-Taqaddum (TQ) Air Base in Al Habbaniyah in Anbar Province, Iraq.

In the late 1930s and 1940s Lake Habbaniyah was used by Imperial Airways as a refueling point and hotel for flying boats flying from the United Kingdom to India. Nearby on the banks of the Euphrates had already been established the Royal Air Force airbase of RAF Dhibban, later renamed RAF Habbaniya.

Lake Habbaniya Sailing Club, 1954

It was the site of a major battle during the Anglo-Iraqi War (part of the Rashid Ali rebellion), where RAF trainee aircrew and stationed troops successfully defended the base against besieging Iraqi forces and subsequent German aerial attacks. In 2014, the area was the site of a number of battles between Iraqi forces and militants of the Islamic State of Iraq and the Levant.

== Hydrology and purpose ==
Lake Habbaniyah was constructed as a flood-control reservoir to protect Baghdad and the lower Euphrates valley from catastrophic spring flooding. The lake is situated in a natural depression that was sealed by an earth embankment and a regulator (the Habbaniyah Dam) completed in the 1950s.

During flood season, excess water from the Euphrates is diverted into Lake Habbaniyah. If the lake reaches its maximum capacity, the water is subsequently drained into the adjacent Lake Milh (also known as the Razazah Lake), which is a highly saline endorheic basin. Because of its artificial control mechanisms, Lake Habbaniyah's water levels and surface area can fluctuate significantly depending on the season and rainfall.

== See also ==
- 123 Signals Unit RAF
- Al Taqaddum - TQ
- RAF Habbaniya
- Lake Tharthar
- Lake Milh
- Lake Qadisiyah
- Mosul Dam
- List of dams and reservoirs in Iraq
- Wildlife of Iraq
