= No. 123 Signals Unit RAF =

Former signals unit of the Royal Air Force

123 Signals Unit was a Ground Controlled Interception Radar Unit of the Royal Air Force formed on 1 July 1954 at RAF Habbaniya, Iraq.

== History ==
It was initially equipped as a Type 21 Radar Convoy with one Type 13 Radar, one Type 14 Radar, a VHF cabin, a Control Centre and a diesel power unit. One Type 15 Radar was added in February 1955. On 8 August 1954, the equipment was moved to a site on the Jabal-Az-Zaban plateau about four miles from the camp.

The Type 21 Convoy was removed in August 1955 and replaced by a Type E Convoy. The technical equipment of the now enlarged unit comprised six radar aerials, (three Type 13s, one 14 Mk 7, one 14 Mk 8 and one Type 15), two RV 10 Control Centres, four RV 540 Cable Carriers, three diesel-powered alternator sets RV 550 and VHF facilities. Each Control Centre contained two PPI consoles, two range/altitude consoles, aerial controls, fighter plotting board and communications. All of this equipment plus the workshop, stores and Unit Administration offices was built on Leyland lorry and trailer chassis.

== De-commission ==
The Signals Unit ceased operations on 15 July 1958, following the military coup in Baghdad. At the end of October 1958, work began on removing the convoy from the plateau to RAF Habbaniya, the Unit strength was reduced to a closing party of ten.

At various times during its brief life, 123 Signals Unit had several high-ranking visitors including:

- Marshal of the Royal Air Force Sir Dermot Boyle (KCVO, KBE, CB, DFC), Chief of the Air Staff
- Air Vice-Marshal H.H. Brookes (CB, CBE, DFC), Air Officer Commanding British Forces in Iraq
- Air Vice-Marshal W.J. Crisham (CB, CBE), Air Officer Commanding, Air Headquarters Levant
- General Enver Alpahy, Director General of Electronics and Communications, Turkish Army
- Brigadier Ismael, Iraqi Army
- Colonel Baghdadi, Royal Iraqi Air Force
- Colonel Azzazi, Royal Iraqi Air Force

123 Signals Unit, Royal Air Force became operational again, but this time in Aden at RAF Steamer Point during the early 1960s. Situated on high ground above Steamer Point Hospital it enjoyed magnificent views over the famous natural harbour of Aden and Little Aden to the west. After 1967 when British Forces left Aden on Independence, the Unit began operating at Juffair in Bahrain.
