= Wildlife of Iraq =

The wildlife of Iraq includes its flora and fauna and their natural habitats. Iraq has multiple biomes from mountainous region in the north to the wet marshlands along the Euphrates river. The western part of the country is mainly desert and some semi-arid regions. As of 2001, seven of Iraq's mammal species and 12 of its bird species were endangered. The endangered species include the northern bald ibis and Persian fallow deer. The Syrian wild ass is extinct, and the Saudi Arabian dorcas gazelle was declared extinct in 2008.

== Mesopotamian marshes ==
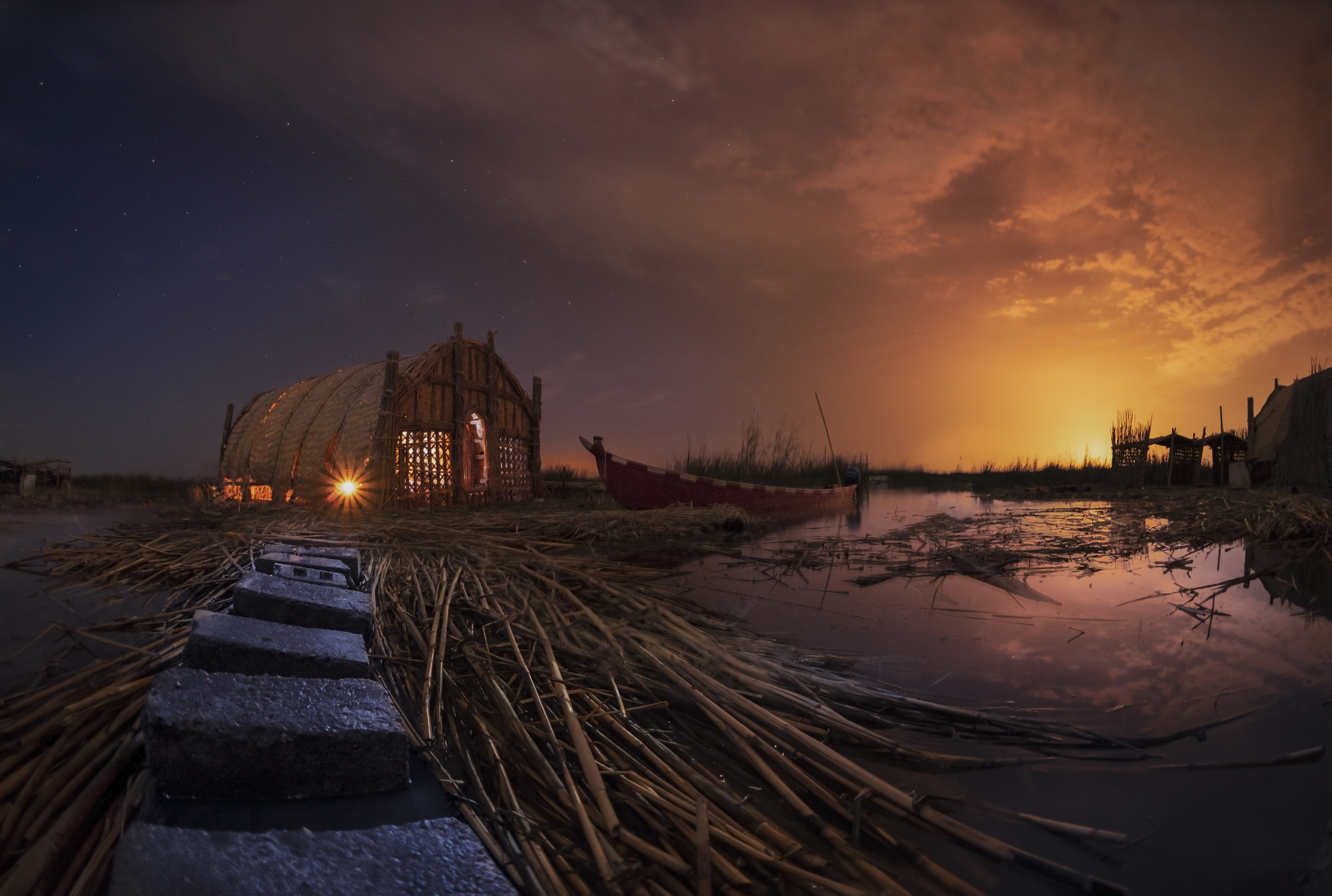
Mesopotamian Marshes of southern Iraq

The marshes are home to 40 species of birds and several species of fish, plus they demarcate a range limit for several bird species. The marshes were once home to millions of birds and the stopover for millions of migratory birds, including flamingo, pelican, and heron as they migrated from Siberia to Africa. At risk are 40% to 60% of the world's marbled teal population that live in the marshes, along with 90% of the world's population of Basra reed-warbler. Seven marsh species are near or fully extinct, including the Indian crested porcupine, the bandicoot rat and the marsh gray wolf. The draining of the marshes caused a significant decline in bioproductivity; following the Multi-National Force overthrow of the Saddam Hussein regime, water flow to the marshes was restored, and the ecosystem has begun to recover.

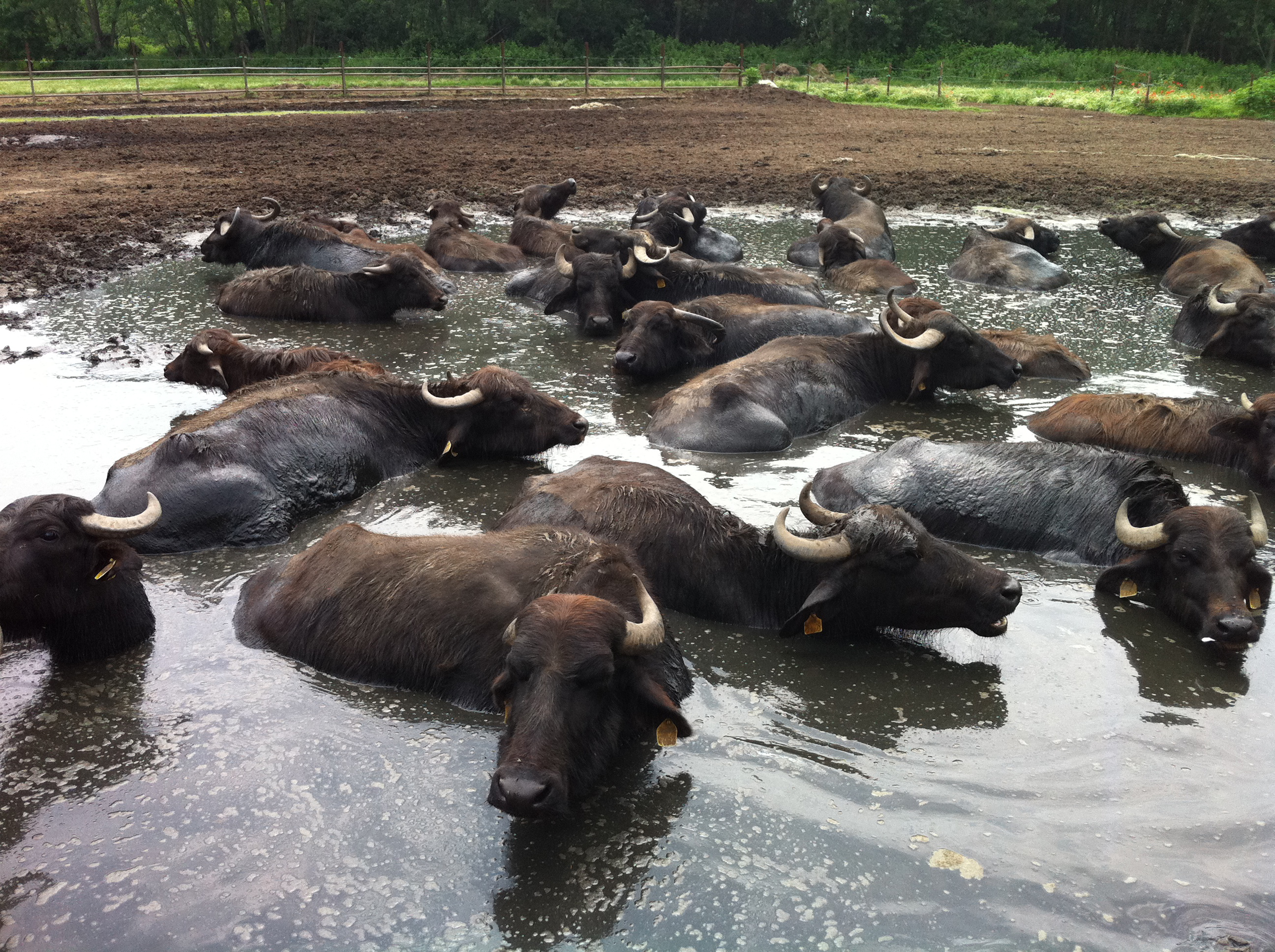
Water buffalo are found in the marshes. The seal of a scribe employed by an Akkadian king shows the sacrifice of water buffaloes.

Aquatic or semi-aquatic wildlife occurs in and around these lakes:

- Lake Habbaniyah
- Lake Milh
- Lake Qadisiyah
- Lake Tharthar

Water birds recorded in marshlands in southern Iraq include little grebe, great crested grebe, cormorant, darter, bittern, grey heron, night heron, purple heron, white stork, cattle egret, sacred ibis, Eurasian teal, common redshank, pied kingfisher, greater spotted eagle, marsh harrier, hooded crow, Iraq babbler, crested lark, pin-tailed sandgrouse, collared dove, Indian roller and starling.

== Coral reef ==
Iraqi coastal waters boast a living coral reef, covering 28 km^{2} in the Persian Gulf, at the mouth of the Shatt al-Arab river (29°37′00″N 048°48′00″W). The coral reef was discovered by joint Iraqi–German expeditions of scientific scuba divers carried out in September 2012 and May 2013. Prior to its discovery, it was believed that Iraq lacked coral reefs as the turbid waters prevented their detection. Iraqi corals were found to be adapted to one of the most extreme coral-bearing environments in the world, as the seawater temperature in this area ranges between 14 and 34 °C. The reef harbours several living stone corals, octocorals, ophiuroids and bivalves. There are also silica-containing demosponges.

== Fauna ==
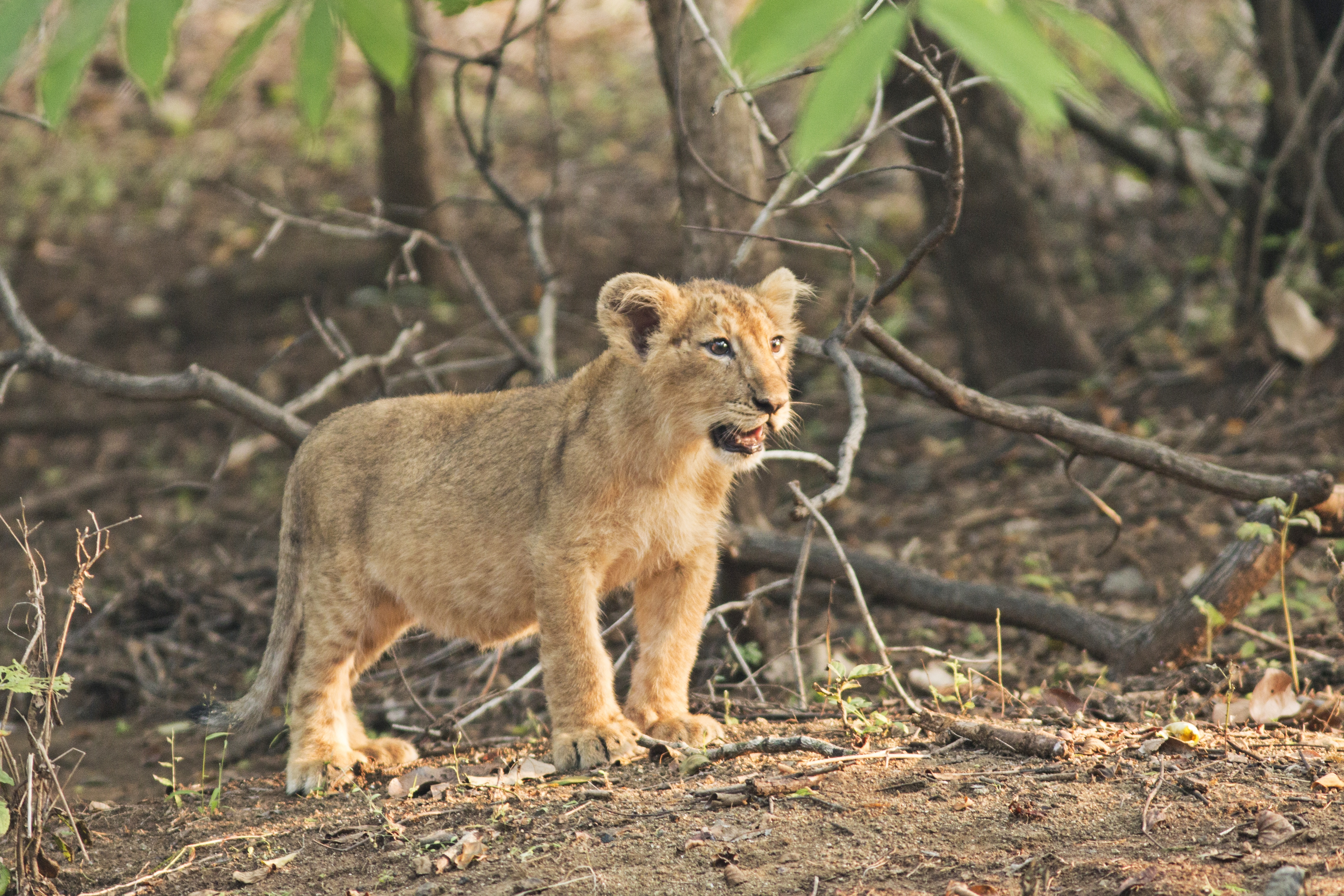
The Asiatic lion has remained a prominent symbol since ancient times.

Due to its diversity in biomes from the Mesopotamian Marshes along the Euphrates River to the semi-arid deserts, Iraq is home to a wide variety of endemic animals and animals that are well-known worldwide for their prevalent populations.

Mammals

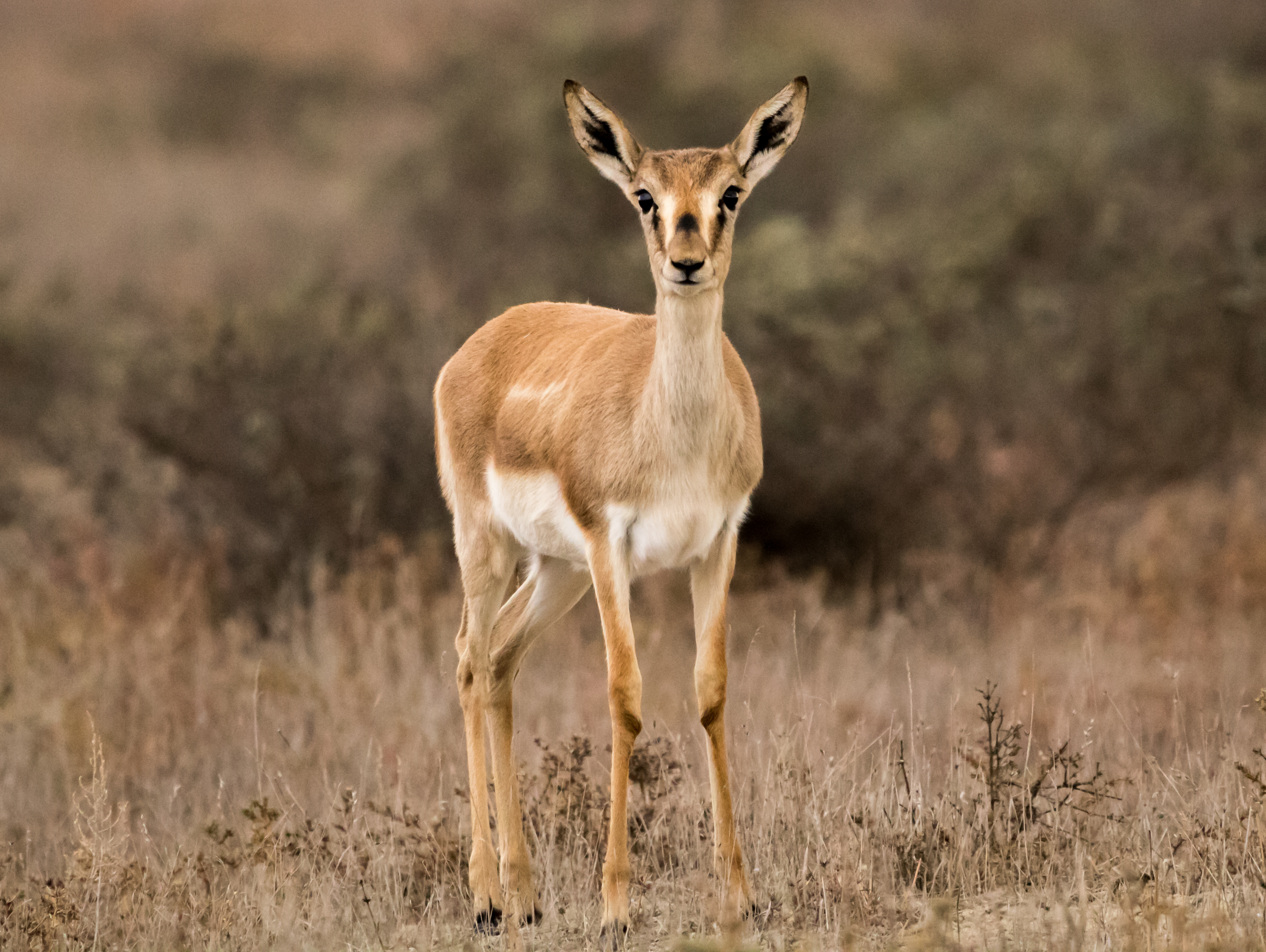
Goitered gazelle

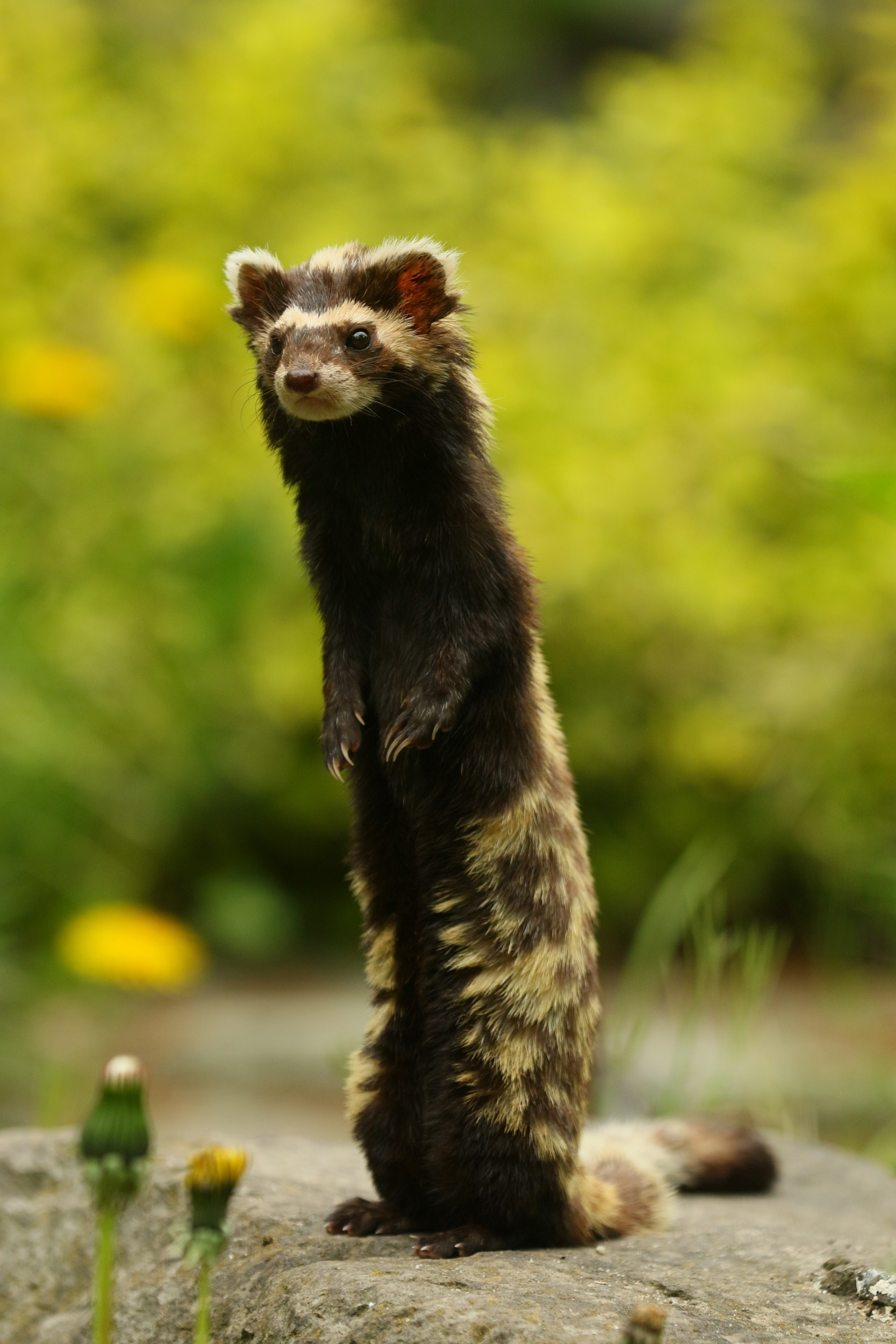
Marbled polecat

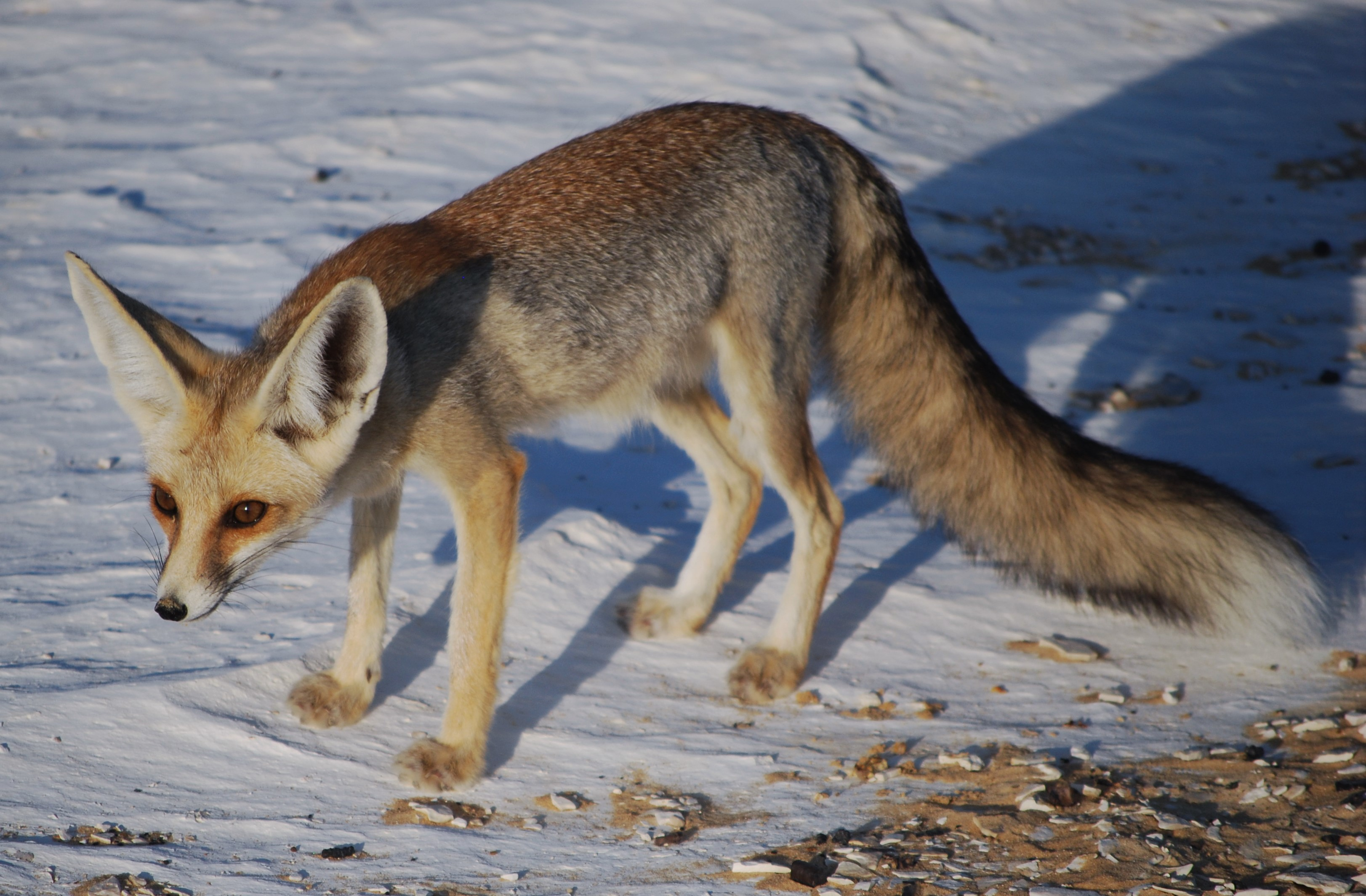
Rüppell's fox

The Eurasian otter and the smooth-coated otter are carnivorous semiaquatic mammals located in the marshes and rivers whose diets consist of primarily fish, amphibians, crustaceans, insects and birds, but their populations have seen a decline since the 1970s. The Persian leopard is a large carnivorous feline located in the northern forest whose diet consists of primarily wild goats. A small population was recorded for the first time at the beginning of the 21st century in the border region between Iraq and Turkey. The sand cat whose presence was recorded for the first time in the desert of Al-Najaf is a small carnivorous feline located in the sandy deserts (diet consists of small rodents, cape hare, greater hoopoe lark, desert monitor, sandfish, cerastes vipers). The Wildcat is a small feline located primarily in forest whose diet consist of rodents, birds, small reptiles and poultry. The Rüppell's fox is a small omnivorous canine that located in deserts north of the Euphrates river whose diet consists of insects, small mammals, lizards, and birds. The Marbled polecat is an omnivorous weasel located in deserts of N.Iraq whose diet consists of small rodents, birds, lizards, fish, frogs, fruit, and grass. The Small Indian mongoose small omnivorous weasel located in the alluvial plains whose diet consists of insects(dragonflies, grasshoppers, mole crickets, ground beetles, earwigs), rodents, amphibians, reptiles, small birds, small grasses, small fruits. The Goitered gazelle is a herbivorous antelope that is located in mountains and areas of broken terrain. The Wild boar is an omnivorous swine located in the marshes and along the numerous rivers in Iraq whose diet consists of plants(rhizomes, roots, bulbs, tubers, nuts, berries, seeds, leaves, bark, twigs, shoots), earthworms, insectivores, insects, rodents, bird eggs, lizards, snakes, frogs, and carrion. The Bactrian camel is located in varying habitats from rocky mountains to arid deserts and has a herbivorous diet that consists of various kinds of vegetation. The European hare is a herbivorous rodent located in the plateaus of Iraq and along the Tigris river.

Other mammals include:

- Indian crested porcupine
- Caucasian squirrel
- Broad-toothed field mouse
- Yellow-necked mouse
- House mouse
- Black rat
- Short-tailed bandicoot rat
- Indian gerbil
- Sundevall's jird

=== Extinct fauna ===
The only confirmed record of a Caspian tiger was a specimen killed near Mosul in 1887. The Asiatic cheetah occurred in the desert west of Basrah until 1926. The last known cheetah in the country was killed by a car. The last known Asiatic lion was killed on the lower Tigris in 1918. The last Arabian oryx was shot in 1914. Syrian elephants roamed Mesopotamia until around 700 BC.

== See also ==
- List of mammals of Iraq
- Wildlife of Iran
