= Mosul Dam =

Dam in Iraq

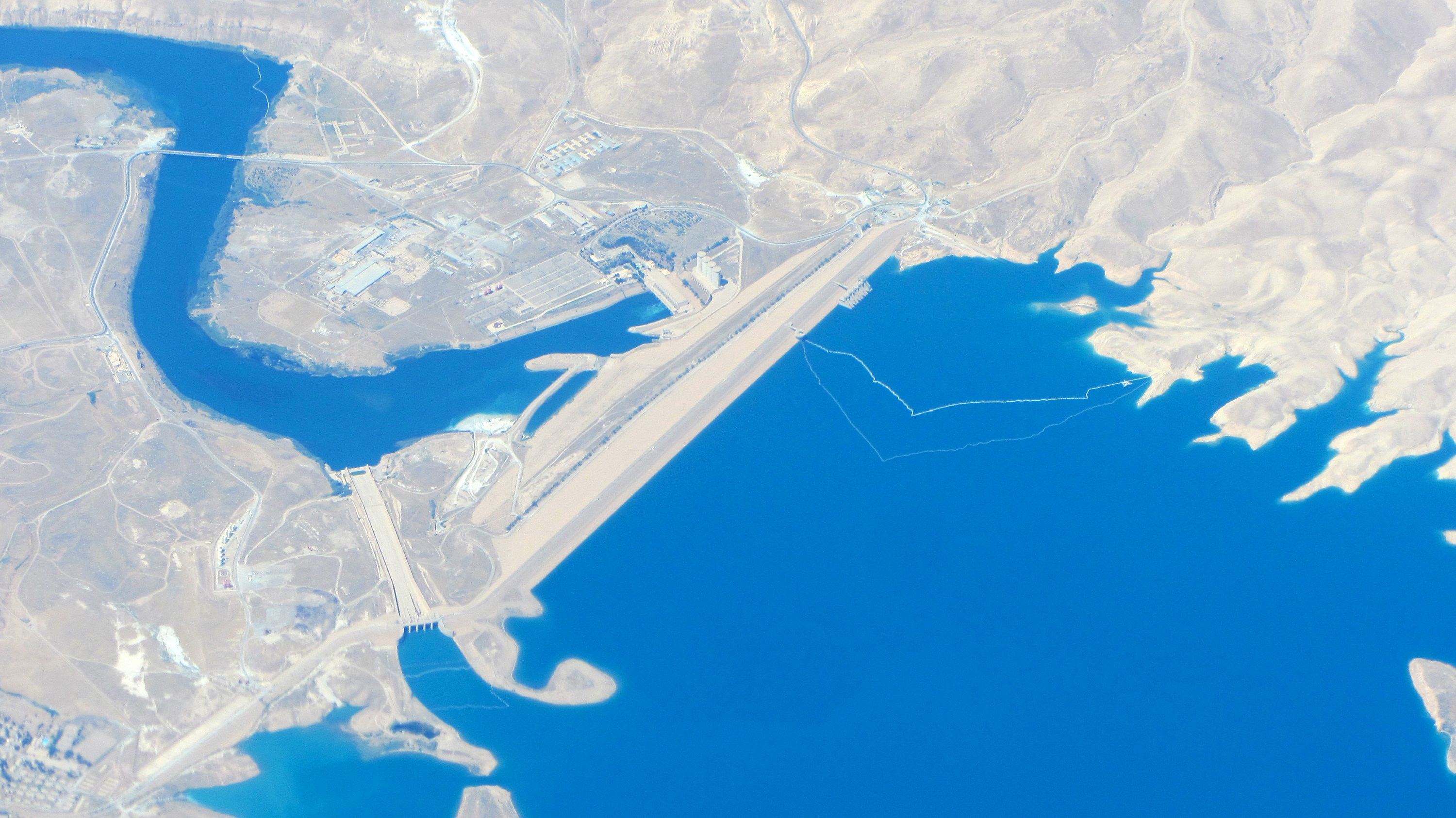

- Location within Iraq
- Location: 45 mi north of Mosul, Nineveh Governorate, Iraq
- Coordinates: 36°37′49″N 42°49′23″E
- Construction began: 25 January 1981; 45 years ago
- Opening date: 7 July 1986; 40 years ago
- Construction cost: US$1.5 billion
- Operator: Ministry of Water Resources (17 August 2014)

Dam and spillways
- Type of dam: Embankment, earth fill clay core
- Impounds: Tigris river
- Height: 113 m (371 ft)
- Length: 3.4 km (2.1 mi)
- Elevation at crest: 341 m (1,120 ft)
- Width (crest): 10 m (33 ft)
- Spillways: 2
- Spillway type: Service: controlled chute Emergency: fuse plug ogee
- Spillway capacity: Service: 13,000 m^{3}/s (460,000 cu ft/s); Emergency: 4,000 m^{3}/s (140,000 cu ft/s)

Reservoir
- Creates: Mosul Dam Lake
- Total capacity: 11,100,000,000 m^{3} (9,000,000 acre⋅ft)
- Active capacity: 8,100,000,000 m^{3} (6,600,000 acre⋅ft)
- Inactive capacity: 2,950,000,000 m^{3} (2,390,000 acre⋅ft)
- Normal elevation: 330 m (1,080 ft)

Power Station
- Commission date: Mosul 1: 1986; Mosul 2: 1985; Mosul 3: 1989
- Turbines: Mosul 1: 4 × 187.5 MW (251,400 hp) Francis type Mosul 2: 4 × 15.5 MW (20,800 hp) Kaplan type Mosul 3: 2 × 120 MW (161,000 hp) Francis pump turbine
- Installed capacity: 1,052 MW (1,411,000 hp)
- Annual generation: 3,420 gigawatt-hours (12,310 TJ)

Mosul Dam (Arabic: سد الموصل), formerly known as Saddam Dam (سد صدام), is the largest dam in Iraq. It is located on the Tigris river in the western governorate of Nineveh, upstream of the city of Mosul. The dam serves to generate hydroelectricity and provide water for downstream irrigation. At full capacity, the structure holds about 11.1 cubic kilometres (2.7 cu mi) of water and provides electricity to the 1.7 million residents of Mosul.

The dam's main 750-megawatt (1,010,000 hp) power station contains four 187.5-megawatt (251,400 hp) Francis turbine–generators. A pumped-storage hydroelectricity power plant with a capacity of 250 megawatts (340,000 hp) and a run-of-the-river dam downstream with a 62-megawatt (83,000 hp) capacity also belong to the Mosul Dam scheme. It is the fourth largest dam in the Middle East, as measured by reserve capacity, capturing snowmelt from Turkey, some 70 miles (110 km) north.

Built in the 1980s on a karst foundation, concerns over the dam's instability have led to major remediation and rehabilitation efforts since the 2003 U.S. invasion of Iraq.

== Characteristics ==
The Mosul Dam is a 113 m (371 ft) tall and 3.4 km (2.1 mi) long earth-fill embankment type with a clay core. The width of the crest is 10 m (33 ft). At an elevation of 330 m (1,080 ft) above sea level, the reservoir, named Lake Dahuk, withholds 11,100,000,000 m^{3} (9,000,000 acre⋅ft) of water. Of that capacity 8,100,000,000 m^{3} (6,600,000 acre⋅ft) is active (or useful for power and downstream releases) and 2,950,000,000 m^{3} (2,390,000 acre⋅ft) is inactive (dead) storage. On the east side of the dam is the service spillway which is controlled by five radial gates and has a maximum discharge capacity of 13,000 m^{3}/s (460,000 cu ft/s). Further to the east is a fuse-plug-controlled emergency spillway with a 4,000 m^{3}/s (140,000 cu ft/s) capacity.

At the toe of the dam on its west side is the main hydroelectric power station (Mosul 1). It contains four 187.5 MW (251,400 hp) Francis turbine generators for an installed capacity of 750 MW. Behind the power station are four surge tanks. Downstream of the dam is the Mosul regulation dam, which serves to regulate the tail-waters of the main dam and to generate electricity as well. The hydroelectric plant (Mosul 2) has an installed capacity of 62 MW with four 15.5 MW Kaplan turbine generators. Immediately upstream of the dam is the 240 MW pumped storage power station (Mosul 3). It serves as a peaking power station by pumping water to a small reservoir above Lake Dahuk, storing it, then releasing the water back down to two 120 MW reversible Francis turbines during peak energy usage. The entire Mosul multi-purpose project has an installed capacity of 1,052 MW.

== History ==
=== Before the dam ===
To ensure as many of the archeological sites were inspected before being submerged under the lake that would form behind the dam, the Iraqi government invited several foreign delegations to participate. This rescue operation included the British Archaeological Expedition to Iraq as a prominent participant. In 1985, one of their sites, Tell Deir Situn garnered an Assyrian fibula, some Hellenic oil lamps, and a Seleucid coin of Alexander Balas.

In 2010, following a massive drought, the ruins of an ancient palace were discovered in the reservoir. The palace, which is approximately 3,400 years old, is believed to have belonged to the Mitanni. The first excavation occurred in 2019 by a joint Kurdish-German team. The ruins include a terrace of mud bricks, walls two meters high and two meters thick, wall paintings, and ten clay tablets covered in cuneiform.

=== Planning ===
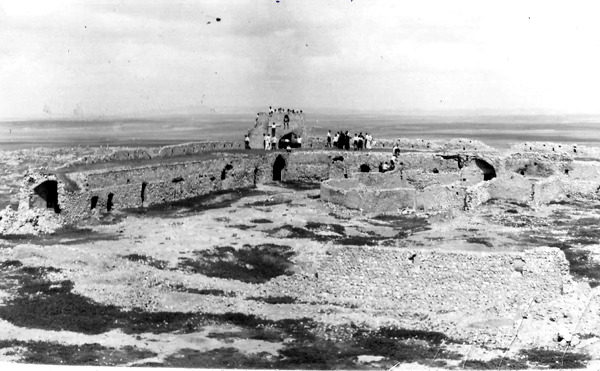
Historical Castle of Aski Mosul before being submerged by the dam's reservoir

Development of Iraq's rivers progressed rapidly in the mid-20th century as Saddam Hussein sought to control water resources for agriculture and to prevent flooding in Baghdad. Planning for the Mosul Dam began in the 1950s with the help of Sir Alexander Gibb & Partners, a British firm who identified a location in 1953. In 1956, the Iraq Development Council contracted Koljian American to carry out studies for an irrigation dam at the location. The studies were completed the next year when Iraq asked the Harza Company to carry out a similar investigation who recommended a different location in 1960, based on karst foundations for two other recommended locations. In 1962, Iraq sought a third opinion from the Soviet Technoprom Export company who recommended a separate site. A fourth company, a Finland firm, Imatran Voima carried out a study in 1965 and a fifth company, Geotehnika of Yugoslavia, carried out studies in 1972. Based on the findings of all five companies which cited complex foundations, Iraq had a French firm, Soletanch, to carry out in-depth geological studies which occurred between 1974 and 1978. In 1978, the Swiss Consultants Consortium became the official consultants for the dam.

=== Construction ===
During Saddam Hussein's rule, the construction of the Mosul Dam began in 1981 by a German–Italian consortium that was led by Hochtief Aktiengesellschaft. Because the dam was constructed on a foundation of soluble gypsum, the engineers recommended thorough grouting within the foundation before the superstructure was built. Instead, to speed construction of the dam, engineers blanket-grouted 25 m (82 ft) deep around the foundation and a curtain 150 m (490 ft) directly below the dam. A grouting gallery that would allow continuous grouting of the dam's foundation in order to promote stability was also installed. Construction was complete in 1984 and in the spring of 1985, the Mosul Dam began to inundate the Tigris River, filling the reservoir which submerged many archaeological sites in the region. The power station began generating power on 7 July 1986. Because of significant structural stability issues associated with the Mosul Dam, ongoing grouting and additional construction and repairs are necessary. In 1988, Iraq began construction on the Badush Dam downstream which would serve the primary purpose of absorbing and releasing a Mosul Dam flood wave in the event of a breach. Works were halted in 1991 though due chiefly to UN sanctions.

=== Demolition concerns during the 2003 invasion ===
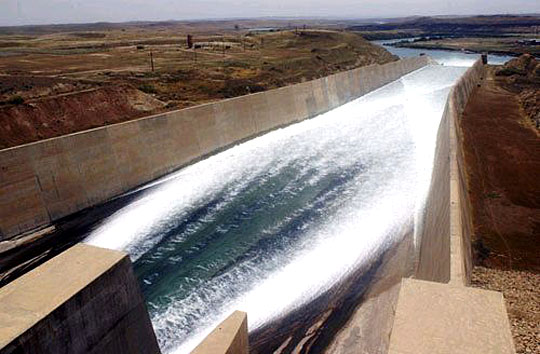
Chute spillway with ski jump section to dissipate the energy of the rushing water

In early April 2003, following the invasion of Iraq by a US-led coalition, military intelligence had developed several scenarios, including one in which Iraqi forces would have wired the dam for detonation. This would release the 110-metre-high (360 ft) wall of water, to reach Mosul in about two hours. Subsequent investigation found nearly 500 dam workers to still be at work nearly a month after pay had stopped being distributed.

=== 2014 takeover by the Islamic State ===
For several weeks in July and August 2014, Islamic State of Iraq and the Levant (ISIS or ISIL) held Mosul Dam. On 7 August 2014, the organization captured the dam complex from the Peshmerga. ISIS's control of the dam created fears that its power supply could be restricted or that its water flows to downstream areas would be greatly inhibited. In a less likely scenario, there were worries the dam could be breached, causing widespread flooding and destruction downstream.

On 17 August 2014, the Peshmerga and the Iraqi Army launched a successful operation to retake control of the dam from ISIS militants. United States airstrikes assisted the Kurdish and Iraqi military, damaging or destroying 19 vehicles belonging to ISIS, as well as striking an ISIS checkpoint near the dam.

== Instability and remediation ==
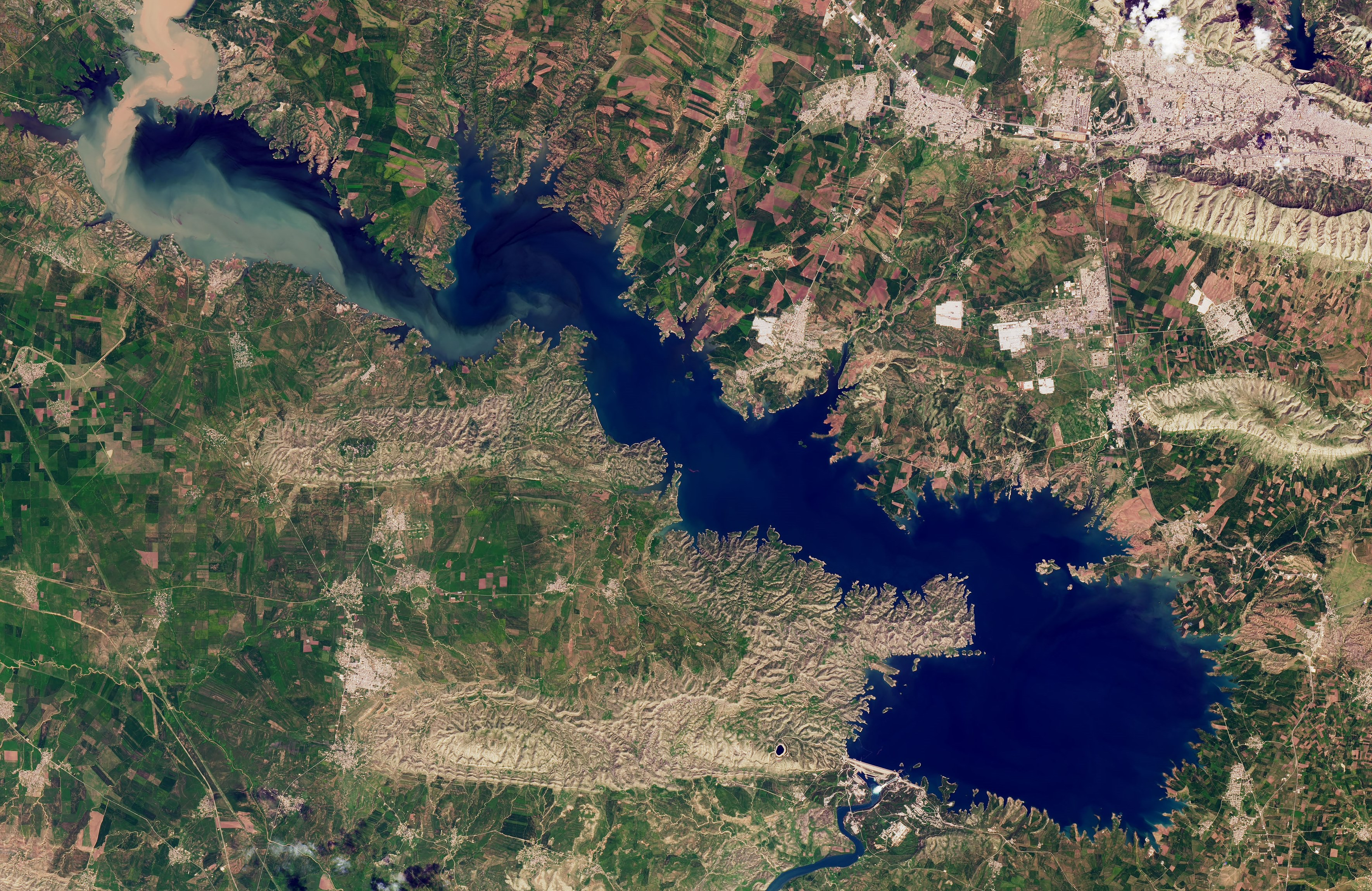
Mosul Dam Lake in 2019

The earthen embankment dam is located on top of gypsum, a soft mineral that dissolves in contact with water. Continuous maintenance is required to plug, or "grout", new leaks with a liquefied slurry of cement and additives. More than 50,000 tonnes (49,000 long tons; 55,000 short tons) of material have been injected into the dam since leaks began forming, shortly after the reservoir was filled in 1986, and 24 machines continuously pump grout into the dam base. Between 1992 and 1998, four sinkholes formed downstream of the dam, and a fifth sinkhole developed east of the dam in February 2003, which was filled several times. In August 2005, another sinkhole developed to the east.

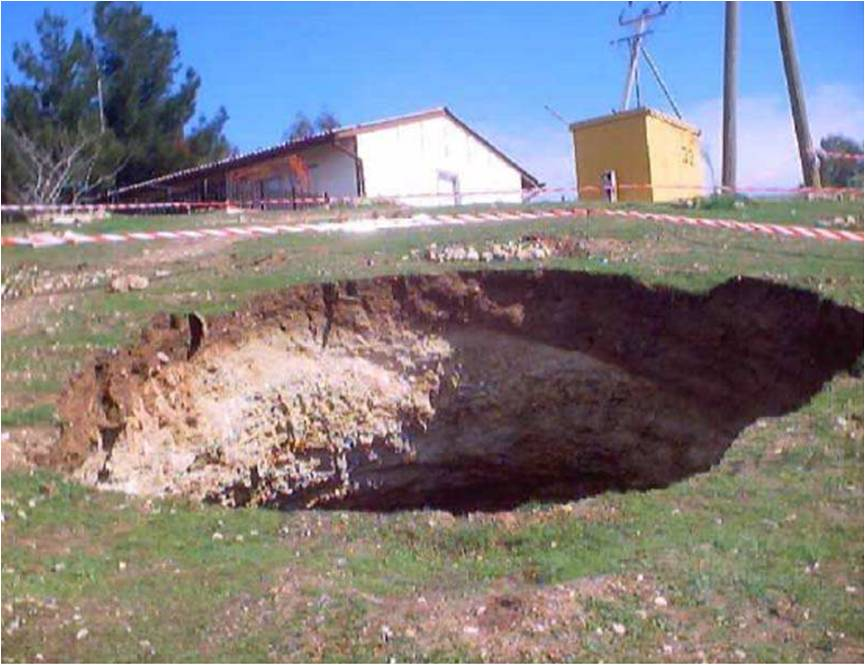
Sinkhole south of the dam in 2007

A September 2006 report by the United States Army Corps of Engineers noted, "In terms of internal erosion potential of the foundation, Mosul Dam is the most dangerous dam in the world." The report further outlined a worst-case scenario, in which a sudden collapse of the dam would flood Mosul under 65 feet (20 m) of water and Baghdad, a city of 7 million, to 15 feet (4.6 m), with an estimated death toll of 500,000. A report on 30 October 2007 by the US Special Inspector General for Iraq Reconstruction (SIGIR) said that the dam's foundations could give way at any moment.

According to The Economist, "One study says that if the dam collapses, Mosul would be submerged within hours. Another warns that half a million Iraqis could be killed by floodwaters, and more than a million forced from their homes. Disease and looting as the floodwaters raced through Baiji, Tikrit, Samarra, and even parts of Baghdad would complete that dreadful scenario." Nadhir al-Ansari, an engineer involved in the building of the dam who is currently Professor of Engineering at the Luleå University of Technology, Sweden, said that the floodwaters would take four hours to reach Mosul and 45 hours to reach Baghdad, and that more than a million people would be killed if a "good evacuation plan" were not in place.

In 2004, dam manager Abdulkhalik Thanoon Ayoub ordered the dam's water level, which can reach 330 metres (1,083 ft) above sea level, to have a maximum of 319 metres (1,047 ft), thus reducing the pressure on the structure. Nevertheless, Iraqi officials maintain that the U.S. government is overstating the risk. The Army Corps of Engineers has proposed that the Badush Dam downstream be completed to serve its purpose of obstructing the large wave that would result if the Mosul Dam collapsed. This has been resisted by Iraqi officials, who note that the current plan for the Badush Dam is US$300 million to provide hydroelectric power and help irrigation while the proposed expansion would cost $10 billion.

In 2007, the U.S. Army Corps of Engineers developed and executed a US$27 million plan to help continue maintenance and repairs on the dam in the short-term. The Iraq Government was also recommended a long-term solution that includes the construction of 67-metre-deep (220 ft) walls around the dam foundation. The project would cost $4 billion and take approximately four to five years to complete.

=== Renewed stability concerns ===
Maintenance had been deferred during the Battle for Mosul Dam in 2014 due to security concerns, and many workers did not work both because of the risk of attacks by ISIS and lack of pay. Half of the workers who worked at the dam have quit because they had not been paid for more than five months, and budget shortfalls and political infighting between the Kurdish regional government and the central government of Iraq have made it difficult to hire new workers. Together these factors have made Mosul Dam the "most dangerous dam in the world", because there are "almost certainly an unprecedented level of untreated voids in the dam's foundation."

Growing instability concerns due to the previous control of the dam by ISIL, and poor security led the Iraq government to award a €273 million contract to the Italian company Trevi S.p.A. in 2016 to grout and stabilize the dam’s foundation and to rehabilitate other key infrastructure on the dam. In July 2018, a contract extension was negotiated for an additional €89 million for a total contract amount of €363 million ($408M). The contract covers repairs to the dam and the Italian government plans to send 450 additional troops to provide security at the dam site.

In January 2016, U.S. General Sean MacFarland warned that the dam might undergo a "catastrophic" collapse. He added, "What we do know is this—if this dam were in the United States, we would have drained the lake behind it." Maintenance had suffered as ISIL had removed equipment and chased technicians away in August 2014, and the grouting schedule had not been maintained. He indicated that contingency plans are in the works to protect people downstream in case of a collapse. Some Iraqi officials continued to dismiss claims of a potential failure. In February 2016, the Minister of Water Resources, Muhsin al-Shammari, stated "The looming danger to Mosul dam is one in a thousand. This risk level is present in all the world's dams."

In February 2016, the United States Embassy in Iraq warned of a "serious and unprecedented" danger of the dam collapsing and suggested that plans for evacuation should be made, as the cities Mosul, Tikrit, Samarra, and Baghdad could be at risk in the event of collapse, and that up to 1.5 million people could be killed in the ensuing flash floods. The Prime Minister of Iraq, Haider al-Abadi, repeated these concerns, and called for citizens in Mosul to evacuate and move at least 3.5 miles away from the river, a proposal that was criticized by Professor al-Ansari: "What are all these people, millions of people, supposed to do when they get 6 km away? There is no support for them there. Nothing to help them live."

On 29 February, a Trevi spokesman said that the contract had still not been signed. There were concerns that the dam could collapse before the repair works begin. On 2 March 2016, the Iraqi government announced that the contract with Trevi was finalized and signed. A team of Italian specialists from Trevi arrived on 14 April to set up camp for the group of engineers who are expected to arrive within a few weeks. Italian Defence Minister Roberta Pinotti met Iraqi Prime Minister Haider al-Abadi on 9 May to discuss logistics for deploying 450 troops near the frontline with ISIL to protect the workers carrying out repairs on the dam. Trevi started working on the dam in September 2016.

The repairs were started in October 2016. In May 2017, Iraqi Minister of Water Resources Hassan Janabi stated that no danger to the dam remained and it was going back to normal operation. Carlo Crippa, the project manager, said the dam structure now showed no significant signs of distress. However, constant maintenance will be necessary, as "the rocks of the foundations are prone to dissolution due to the circulation of water." Five waterways that controlled the flow of water into the dam became operational after 12 years, with Janabi saying the water level was at the highest level since 2005. The repairs were completed by 2019. In 2022 the scheme was awarded the Outstanding Project Award by the Deep Foundations Institute.

== See also ==
- List of hydroelectric power station failures
- Haditha Dam
- Euphrates Dam
- Mansoura Dam
- Lake Tharthar
- Lake Habbaniyah
- Lake Milh
- Lake Qadisiyah
- List of dams and reservoirs in Iraq
