= List of mammals of Iraq =

The list of mammals of Iraq comprises seventy-eight mammal species, of which one is endangered, eleven are vulnerable, and three are near threatened. One of the species is probably locally extinct in the wild.

The following tags are used to highlight each species' conservation status as assessed on the IUCN Red List:

| EX | Extinct | No reasonable doubt that the last individual has died. |
| EW | Extinct in the wild | Known only to survive in captivity or as a naturalized populations well outside its previous range. |
| CR | Critically endangered | The species is in imminent risk of extinction in the wild. |
| EN | Endangered | The species is facing an extremely high risk of extinction in the wild. |
| VU | Vulnerable | The species is facing a high risk of extinction in the wild. |
| NT | Near threatened | The species does not meet any of the criteria that would categorise it as risking extinction but it is likely to do so in the future. |
| LC | Least concern | There are no current identifiable risks to the species. |
| DD | Data deficient | There is inadequate information to make an assessment of the risks to this species. |

== Order: Artiodactyla (even-toed ungulates) ==
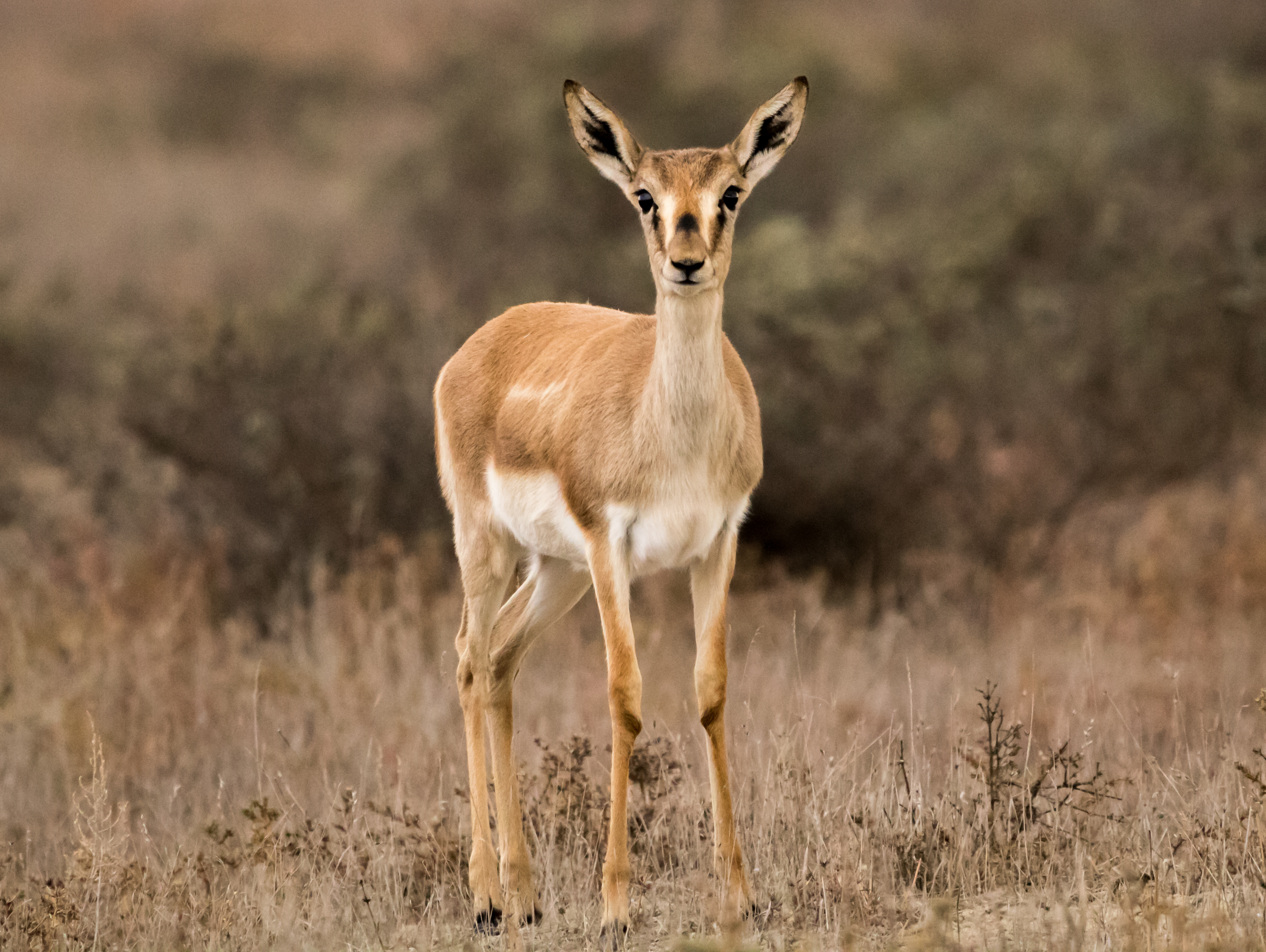
Goitered gazelle

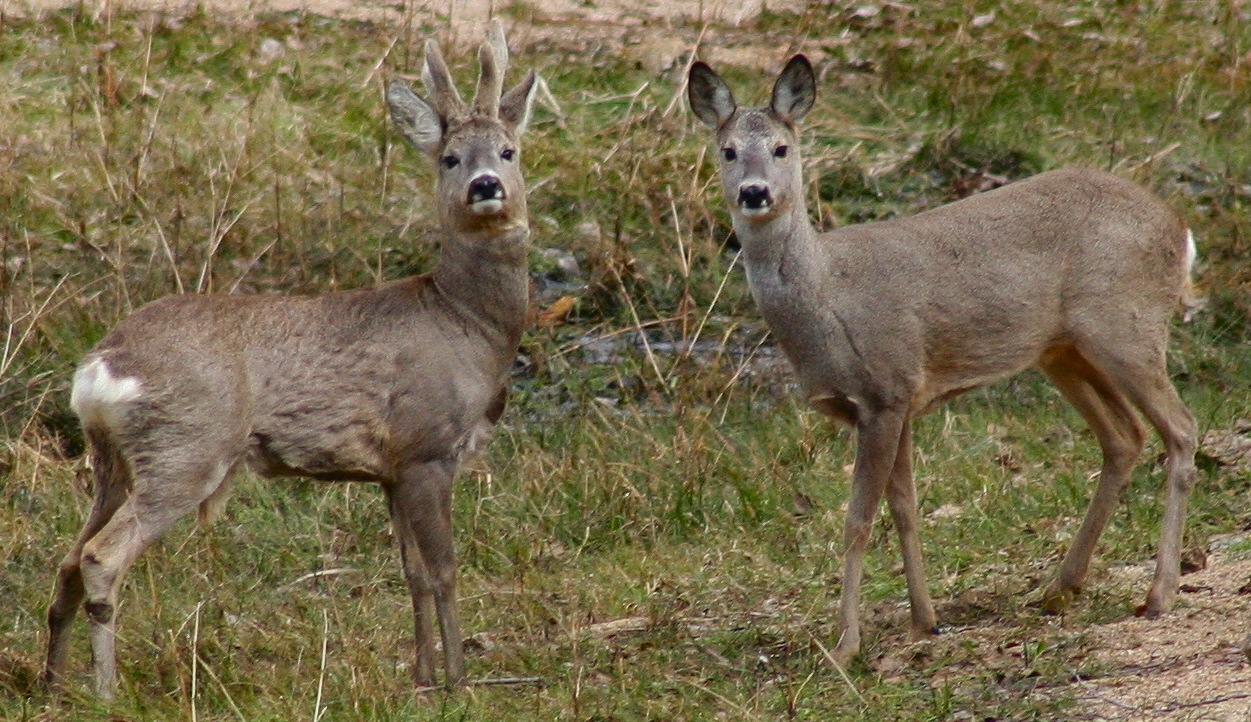
Roe deer

The even-toed ungulates are ungulates whose weight is borne about equally by the third and fourth toes, rather than mostly or entirely by the third as in perissodactyls. There are about 220 artiodactyl species, including many that are of great economic importance to humans.

- Family: Bovidae (cattle, antelope, sheep, goats)
  - Subfamily: Antilopinae
    - Genus: Gazella
      - Arabian sand gazelle, G. marica VU
      - Goitered gazelle, G. subgutturosa VU presence uncertain
  - Subfamily: Caprinae
    - Genus: Capra
      - Wild goat, C. aegagrus NT
    - Genus: Ovis
      - Mouflon, O. gmelini NT
- Family: Cervidae (deer)
  - Subfamily: Capreolinae
    - Genus: Capreolus
      - Roe deer, C. capreolus LC
  - Subfamily: Cervinae
    - Genus: Cervus
      - Red deer, C. elaphus LC
- Family: Suidae (pigs)
  - Genus: Sus
    - Wild boar, S. scrofa LC

== Order: Carnivora ==
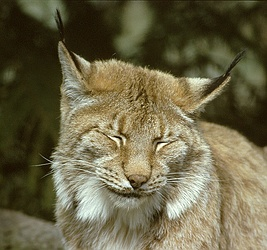
Eurasian lynx

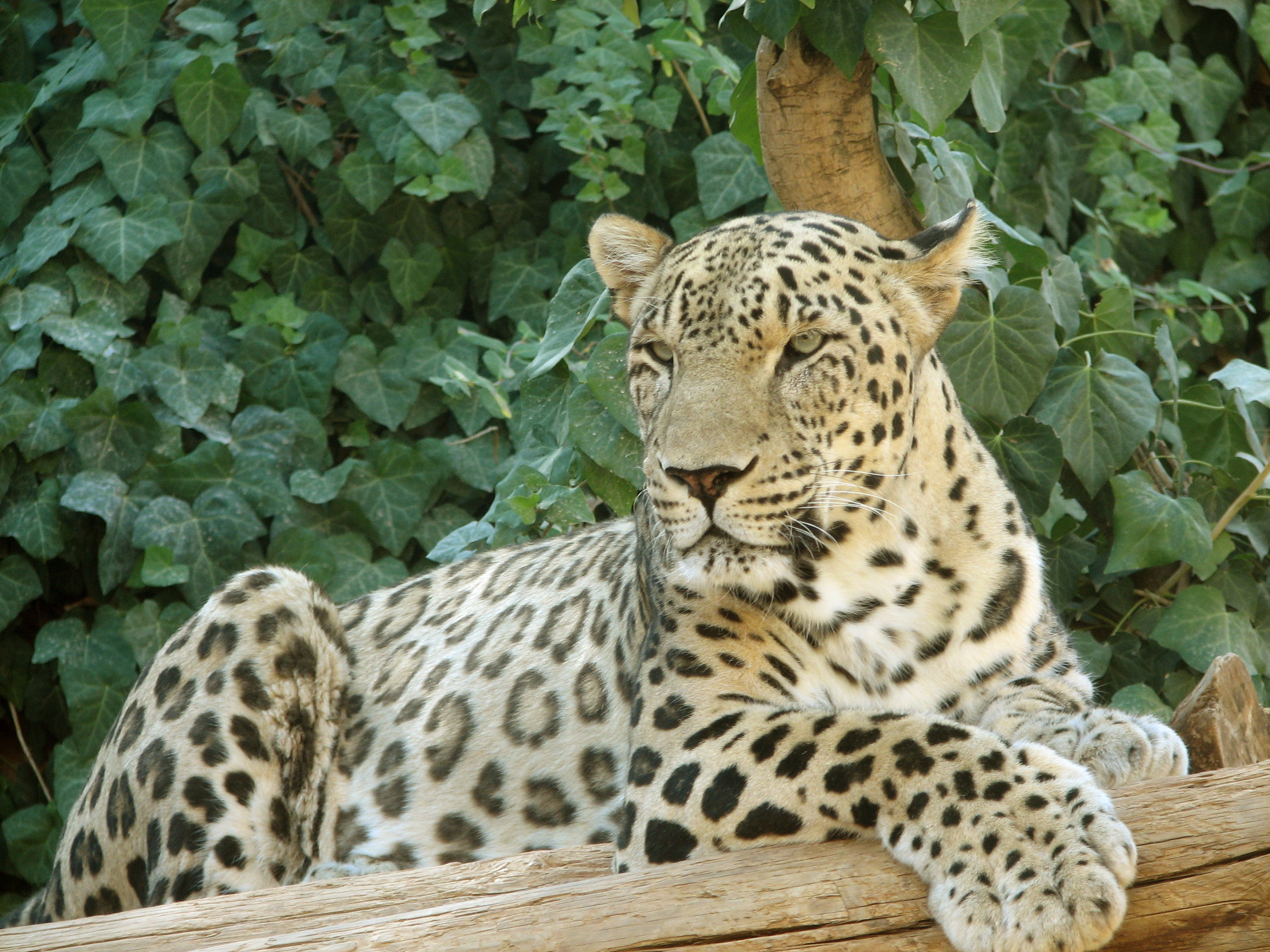
Persian leopard

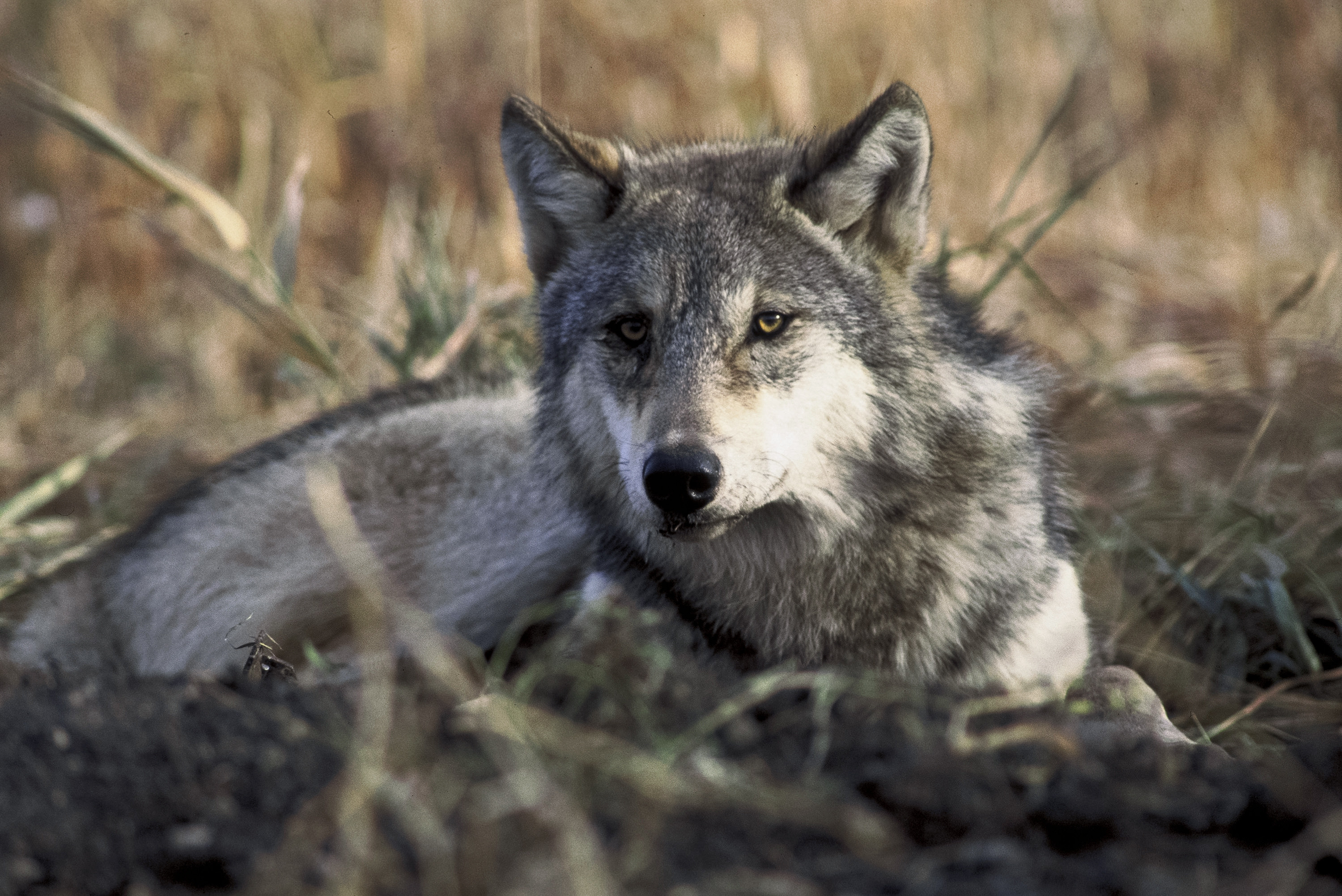
Gray wolf

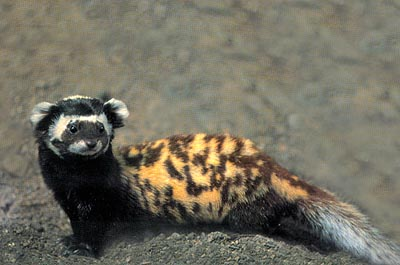
Marbled polecat

There are over 260 species of carnivorans, the majority of which feed primarily on meat. They have a characteristic skull shape and dentition.

- Suborder: Feliformia
  - Family: Felidae (cats)
    - Subfamily: Felinae
      - Genus: Caracal
        - Caracal, C. caracal LC
      - Genus: Felis
        - Jungle cat, F. chaus LC
        - African wildcat, F. lybica LC
        - Sand cat, F. margarita LC
      - Genus: Lynx
        - Eurasian lynx, L. lynx LC
    - Subfamily: Pantherinae
      - Genus: Panthera
        - Leopard, P. pardus VU
          - Panthera pardus tulliana EN
  - Family: Hyaenidae
    - Genus: Hyaena
      - Striped hyena, H. hyaena LC
  - Family: Herpestidae (mongooses)
    - Genus: Urva
      - Small Indian mongoose, U. auropunctata LC
- Suborder: Caniformia
  - Family: Canidae
    - Genus: Canis
      - Golden jackal, C. aureus LC
        - Persian jackal, C. a. aureus
        - Syrian jackal, C. a. syriacus
      - Gray wolf, C. lupus LC
        - Arabian wolf, C. l. arabs
    - Genus: Vulpes
      - Rüppell's fox, V. rueppellii LC
      - Red fox, V. vulpes LC
  - Family: Ursidae (bears)
    - Genus: Ursus
      - Brown bear, U. arctos LC
        - Syrian brown bear, U. a. syriacus
  - Family: Mustelidae
    - Genus: Lutra
      - Eurasian otter, L. lutra NT
    - Genus: Lutrogale
      - Smooth-coated otter, L. perspicillata VU
    - Genus: Martes
      - European pine marten, M. martes LC
    - Genus: Meles
      - Caucasian badger, M. canescens NE
    - Genus: Mellivora
      - Honey badger, M. capensis LC
    - Genus: Vormela
      - Marbled polecat, V. peregusna VU

== Order: Cetacea (whales) ==
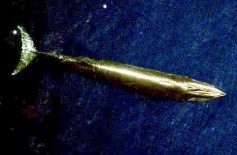
Bryde's whale

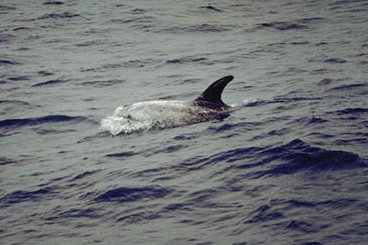
Risso's dolphin

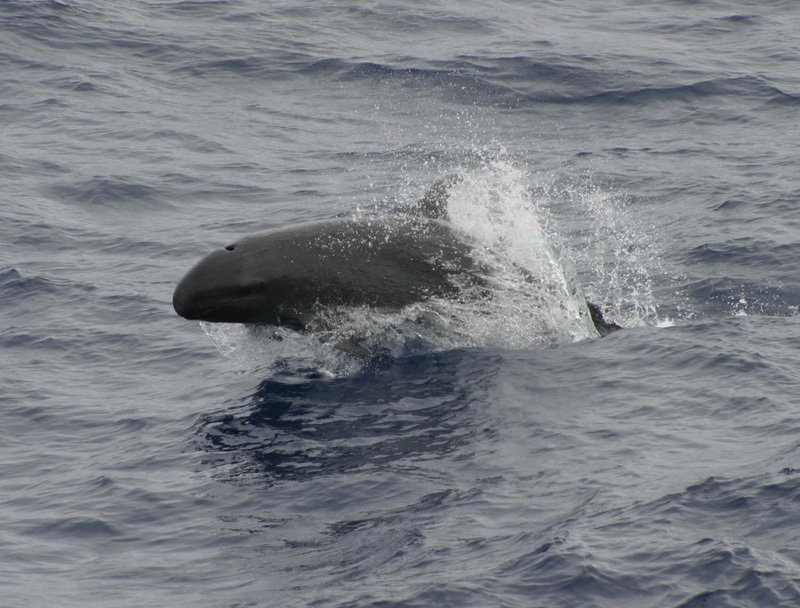
False killer whale

The order Cetacea includes whales, dolphins and porpoises. They are the mammals most fully adapted to aquatic life with a spindle-shaped nearly hairless body, protected by a thick layer of blubber, and forelimbs and tail modified to provide propulsion underwater.

- Suborder: Mysticeti
  - Family: Balaenopteridae
    - Subfamily: Balaenopterinae
      - Genus: Balaenoptera
        - Bryde's whale, B. edeni DD
    - Subfamily: Megapterinae
      - Genus: Megaptera
        - Humpback whale, M. novaeangliae VU
- Suborder: Odontoceti
  - Superfamily: Platanistoidea
    - Family: Phocoenidae
      - Genus: Neophocaena
        - Finless porpoise, N. phocaenoides DD
    - Family: Delphinidae (marine dolphins)
      - Genus: Grampus
        - Risso's dolphin, G. griseus DD
      - Genus: Pseudorca
        - False killer whale, P. crassidens NT
      - Genus: Sousa
        - Indo-Pacific humpback dolphin, S. chinensis DD

== Order: Chiroptera (bats) ==
The bats' most distinguishing feature is that their forelimbs are developed as wings, making them the only mammals capable of flight. Bat species account for about 20% of all mammals.

- Family: Vespertilionidae
  - Subfamily: Myotinae
    - Genus: Myotis
      - Lesser mouse-eared bat, M. blythii LC
      - Long-fingered bat, M. capaccinii VU
  - Subfamily: Vespertilioninae
    - Genus: Eptesicus
      - Botta's serotine, E. bottae LC
      - Northern bat, E. nilssoni LC
    - Genus: Pipistrellus
      - Kuhl's pipistrelle, P. kuhlii LC
      - Rüppell's pipistrelle, P. rueppelli LC
    - Genus: Rhyneptesicus
      - Sind bat, R. nasutus LC
  - Subfamily: Miniopterinae
    - Genus: Miniopterus
      - Common bent-wing bat, M. schreibersii VU
- Family: Rhinopomatidae
  - Genus: Rhinopoma
    - Lesser mouse-tailed bat, R. hardwickei LC
    - Greater mouse-tailed bat, R. microphyllum LC
- Family: Molossidae
  - Genus: Tadarida
    - European free-tailed bat, T. teniotis LC
- Family: Rhinolophidae
  - Subfamily: Rhinolophinae
    - Genus: Rhinolophus
      - Mediterranean horseshoe bat, R. euryale NT
      - Greater horseshoe bat, R. ferrumequinum LC
      - Lesser horseshoe bat, R. hipposideros LC
      - Mehely's horseshoe bat, R. mehelyi VU

== Order: Erinaceomorpha (hedgehogs and gymnures) ==
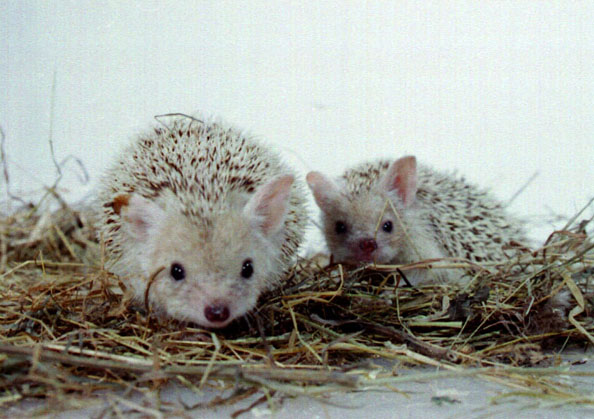
Long-eared hedgehog

The order Erinaceomorpha contains a single family, Erinaceidae, which comprise the hedgehogs and gymnures. The hedgehogs are easily recognised by their spines while gymnures look more like large rats.

- Family: Erinaceidae (hedgehogs)
  - Subfamily: Erinaceinae
    - Genus: Hemiechinus
      - Long-eared hedgehog, H. auritus LC
    - Genus: Paraechinus
      - Desert hedgehog, P. aethiopicus LC

== Order: Lagomorpha (lagomorphs) ==
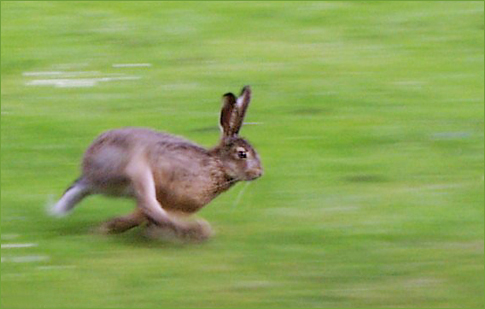
European hare

The lagomorphs comprise two families, Leporidae (hares and rabbits), and Ochotonidae (pikas). Though they can resemble rodents, and were classified as a superfamily in that order until the early 20th century, they have since been considered a separate order. They differ from rodents in a number of physical characteristics, such as having four incisors in the upper jaw rather than two.

- Family: Leporidae (rabbits, hares)
  - Genus: Lepus
    - Cape hare, L. capensis LC
    - European hare, L. europaeus LC

== Order: Rodentia ==
Rodents make up the largest order of mammals, with over 40% of mammalian species. They have two incisors in the upper and lower jaw which grow continually and must be kept short by gnawing. Most rodents are small though the capybara can weigh up to 45 kg (99 lb).

- Suborder: Hystricognathi
  - Family: Hystricidae (Old World porcupines)
    - Genus: Hystrix
      - Indian crested porcupine, H. indica LC
- Suborder: Sciurognathi
  - Family: Sciuridae (squirrels)
    - Subfamily: Sciurinae
      - Tribe: Sciurini
        - Genus: Sciurus
          - Caucasian squirrel, S. anomalus
  - Family: Gliridae (dormice)
    - Subfamily: Leithiinae
      - Genus: Dryomys
        - Forest dormouse, Dryomys nitedula
      - Genus: Eliomys
        - Asian garden dormouse, E. melanurus LC
  - Family: Dipodidae (jerboas)
    - Subfamily: Allactaginae
      - Genus: Allactaga
        - Euphrates jerboa, Allactaga euphratica
  - Family: Spalacidae
    - Subfamily: Spalacinae
      - Genus: Nannospalax
        - Palestine mole rat, Nannospalax ehrenbergi LC
  - Family: Cricetidae
    - Subfamily: Cricetinae
      - Genus: Cricetulus
        - Grey dwarf hamster, Cricetulus migratorius
      - Genus: Mesocricetus
        - Turkish hamster, Mesocricetus brandti
    - Subfamily: Arvicolinae
      - Genus: Microtus
        - Günther's vole, Microtus guentheri
        - Persian vole, Microtus irani
  - Family: Muridae (mice, rats, voles, gerbils, hamsters)
    - Subfamily: Deomyinae
      - Genus: Acomys
        - Cairo spiny mouse, Acomys cahirinus LC
    - Subfamily: Gerbillinae
      - Genus: Gerbillus
        - Cheesman's gerbil, Gerbillus cheesmani
        - Wagner's gerbil, Gerbillus dasyurus
        - Gerbillus mesopotamiae
        - Gerbillus nanus LC
      - Genus: Meriones
        - Sundevall's jird, Meriones crassus LC
        - Libyan jird, Meriones libycus LC
        - Persian jird, Meriones persicus
        - Tristram's jird, Meriones tristrami
      - Genus: Tatera
        - Indian gerbil, Tatera indica
    - Subfamily: Murinae
      - Genus: Apodemus
        - Persian field mouse, Apodemus arianus
        - Broad-toothed field mouse, Apodemus mystacinus
        - Black Sea field mouse, Apodemus ponticus
      - Genus: Nesokia
        - Bunn's short-tailed bandicoot rat, Nesokia bunnii
        - Short-tailed bandicoot rat, Nesokia indica LC

== Order: Sirenia (manatees and dugongs) ==
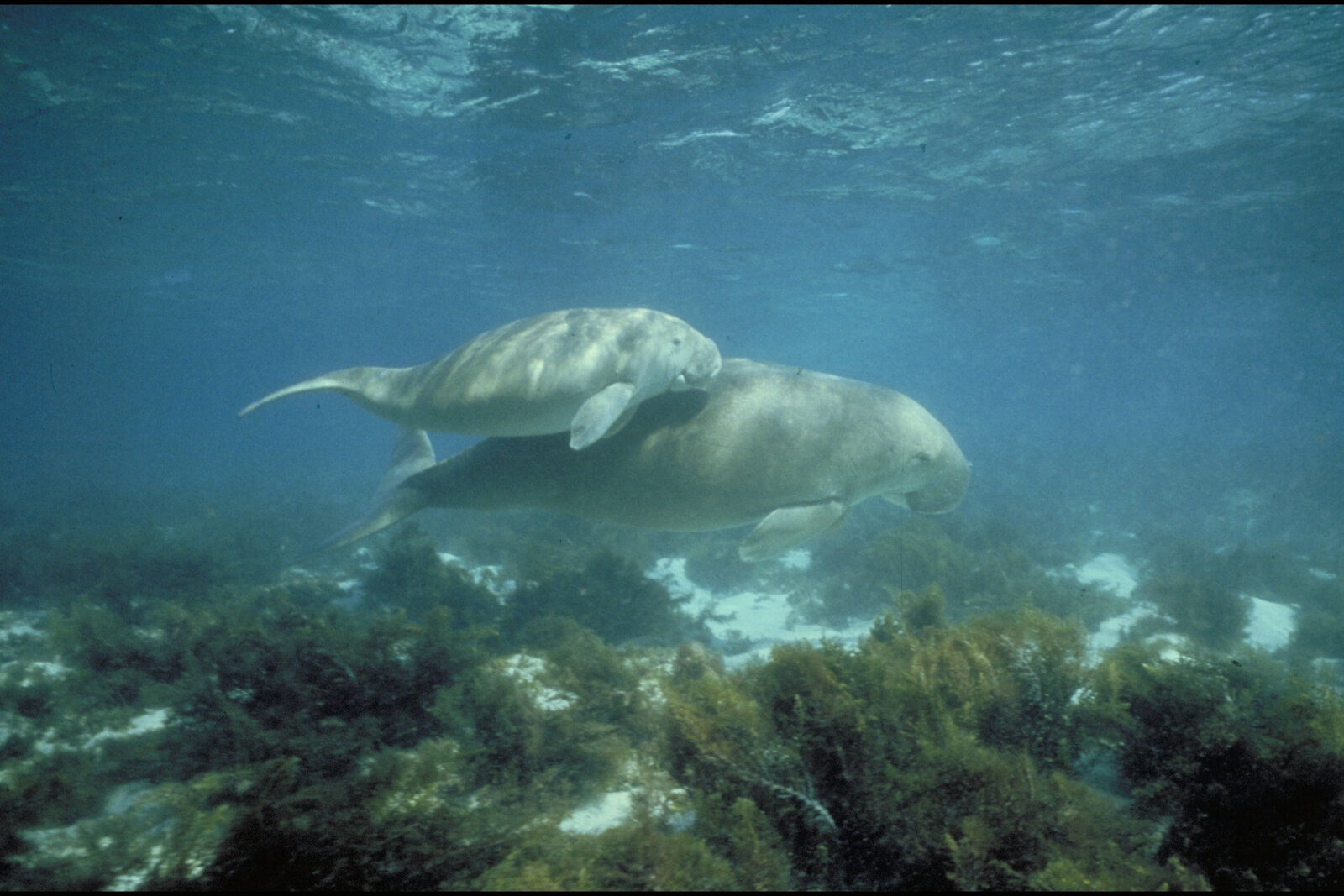
Dugongs

Sirenia is an order of fully aquatic, herbivorous mammals that inhabit rivers, estuaries, coastal marine waters, swamps, and marine wetlands. All four species are endangered.

- Family: Dugongidae
  - Genus: Dugong
    - Dugong, D. dugon VU

== Order: Soricomorpha (shrews, moles, and solenodons) ==
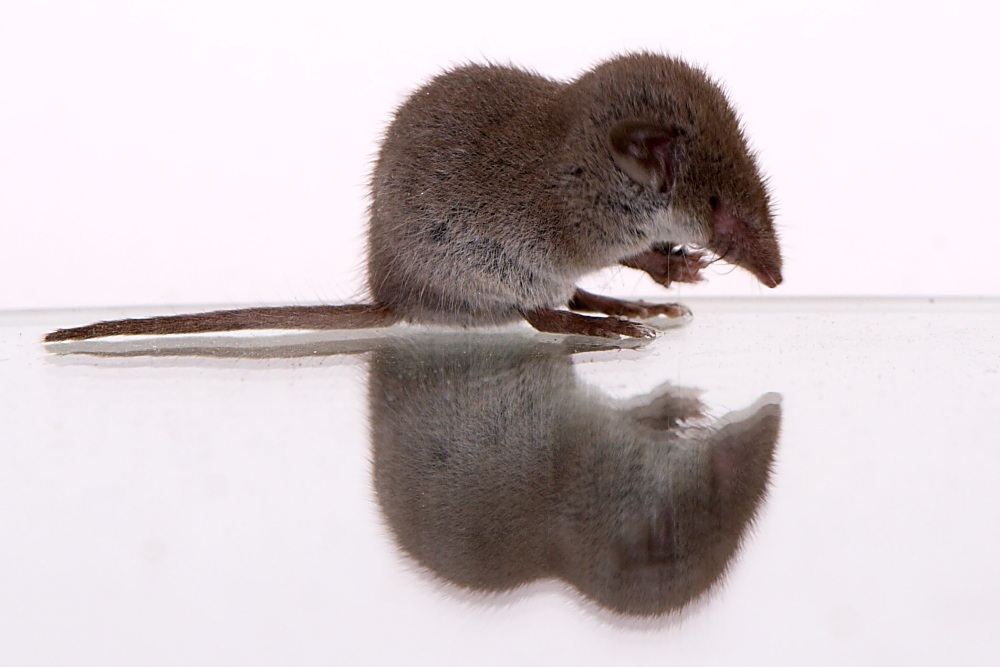
Lesser white-toothed shrew

The "shrew-forms" are insectivorous mammals. The shrews and solenodons closely resemble mice while the moles are stout-bodied burrowers.

- Family: Soricidae (shrews)
  - Subfamily: Crocidurinae
    - Genus: Crocidura
      - Lesser white-toothed shrew, C. suaveolens LC

== Locally extinct ==
The following species are locally extinct in the country:

- Cheetah, Acinonyx jubatus
- European bison, Bison bonasus
- Eurasian beaver, Castor fiber
- Persian fallow deer, Dama mesopotamica
- Onager, Equus hemionus
- Arabian oryx, Oryx leucoryx
- Lion, Panthera leo
- Tiger, Panthera tigris

== See also ==
- List of chordate orders
- Lists of mammals by region
- Mammal classification
- Wildlife of Iraq
