= Lake Milh =

Lake in Iraq

Lake Razzaza
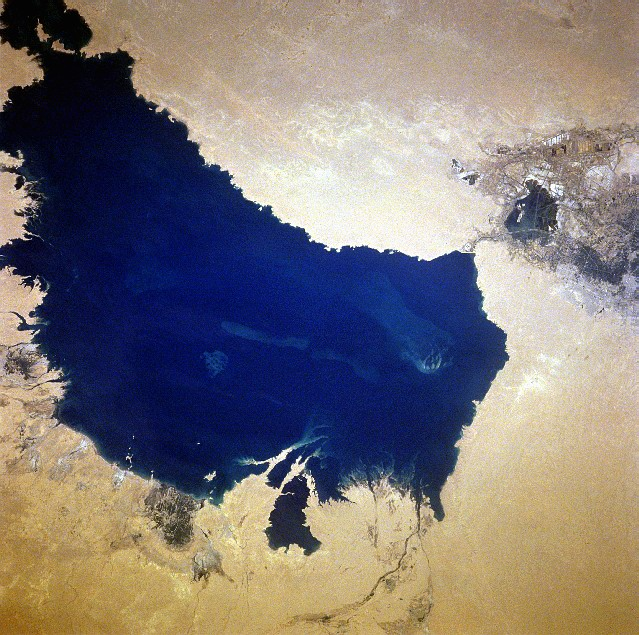
- From space, June 1996
- Interactive map of Lake Razzaza
- Coordinates: 32°45′09″N 43°38′06″E
- Type: Saline
- Primary inflows: Canal from Lake Habbaniyah, ultimately the Euphrates
- Primary outflows: Euphrates River
- Basin countries: Iraq
- Surface area: 1,562.34 km^{2} (603.22 sq mi)

Lake Razzaza (Arabic: البحيرة الرزازة, romanized: Buhairat Al-Razzaza, lit. 'Lake of spray'), also known as Lake Milh (Arabic: بحيرة الملح, romanized: Buhairat Al-Milh, lit. 'Lake of Salt'), is an artificial lake located a few miles west of Karbala, Iraq (32°41′N 43°40′E). The lake is located in a depression into which excess water from Lake Habbaniyah, which comes from the Euphrates River, is diverted through a controlled escape channel or canal. The lake is listed as a wetland of international importance. The lake is rather shallow and the water level changes seasonally. Due to its salt content and changing water level, this largest freshwater lake in Iraq has lost its important stock of fish species and only a few recreational areas exist around the lake.

== Geography ==
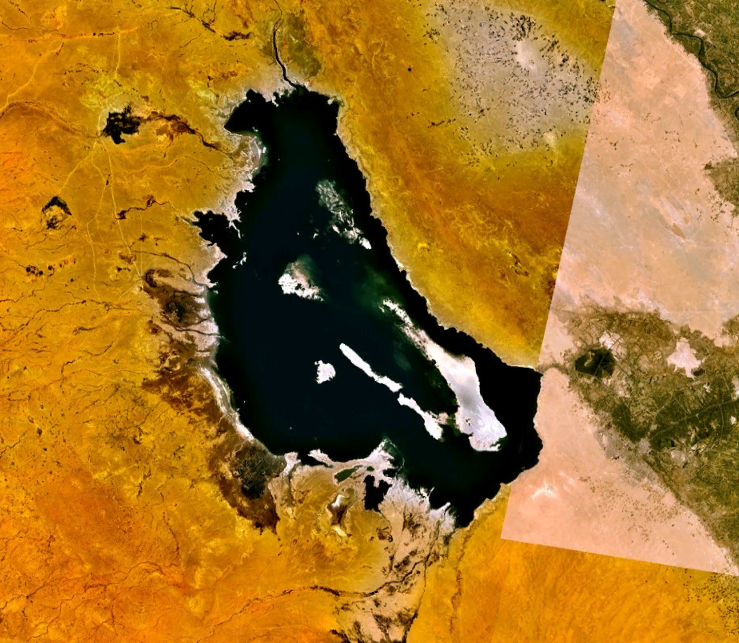
A satellite image of Lake Milh in 2010, taken from the program World Wind

The lake, also termed the Karbala Gap, covers an area of 156,234 hectares (386,060 acres) enclosed by deserts with a few low hills on the shoreline. The lake and its surrounding area lie in an elevation range of 28 to 56 metres (92 to 184 ft). It is a deep closed lake in a sand and silt basin. The western part of the valley surrounding the lake has thick forest cover, as well as orchards. In the eastern and southern surroundings, the terrain is flat desert and semi-desert. Mud flats are a common feature in the lake.

The geological formations in and around the lake consist of marl, siltstone, gypsum and anhydrite, and limestone bands, but mostly silt.

The lake is 95 kilometres (59 mi) south-west of Baghdad, and 10 kilometres (6.2 mi) west of Karbala in Karbala Governorate.

== History ==
The lake was constructed during the latter half of the 1970s, downstream of the Hawr al Habbaniyah as a flood control measure to regulate the floodwaters of the Euphrates River.

== Features ==
The lake is fed from the excess floodwater diverted from the Majora Escape of Lake Habbaniyah. The flow from the escape is diverted through the Sin al Thibban canal, which is a narrow channel that is aligned through a semi-desert area. This diversion prevents flooding in the northern areas. The salinity of the lake is increasing as result of inadequate water supply from the linked canal. According to a USGS study of satellite imagery of the area it is noted that the water level of the lake fluctuates with the seasons, and in 1995, 2003, and 2013 the area of the lake was reduced considerably. The local people said that the lake's depth has been reduced to about 5–10 metres (16–33 ft) since 1993, during the regime of Saddam Hussein. The reason for this reduction is mainly due to inadequate diversion of water from Lake Habbaniyah, where the priority of use is irrigation. Diversion has been limited to once every 15 days only. This has also affected fishing operations in the lake which used to be throughout the year. As a result, the only fish species surviving in the lake is reported to be al-Shanik or Shanak (Acanthopagrus arabicus) of marine origin, stocked in the lake by the government. During the Gulf War the area was a military establishment.

== Vegetation ==
The vegetation around the periphery of the lake consists of Aeluropus lagopoides, Juncus acutus, Phragmites australis, Salicornia herbacea, and Schoenoplectus litoralis. Also reported are shrublands made up of the desert species Haloxylon salicornicum, Nitraria retusa, Prosopis farcta, Tamarix aucherana, Tamarix macrocarpa, and Zygophyllum fabago.

== Fauna ==
The lake area has a large number of wintering waterbirds. Some of the species reported are marbled duck, great crested grebe, black-necked grebe, great cormorant, great white pelican, smew and Eurasian coot. According to a survey 42 bird species have been recorded. The lake has been designated an Important Bird Area (IBA) by BirdLife International.

Mammal species reported include the Rüppell's fox, golden jackal, Indian grey mongoose, jungle cat and European wildcat.

== See also ==
- Lake Tharthar
- Lake Habbaniyah
- Lake Qadisiyah
- List of dams and reservoirs in Iraq
- Mosul Dam
- Wildlife of Iraq

== Bibliography ==
- Division, Naval Intelligence (3 September 2014). Iraq & The Persian Gulf. Routledge. ISBN 978-1-136-89266-0.
- Germany, American Chamber of Commerce in (1930). Transatlantic Trade: The Illustrated Magazine of the American Chamber of Commerce in Germany ... American Chamber of Commerce in Germany.
- Scott, Derek A. (1995). A directory of wetlands in the Middle East. IUCN. ISBN 9782831702704.
