= Lake Tharthar =

Lake In Iraq

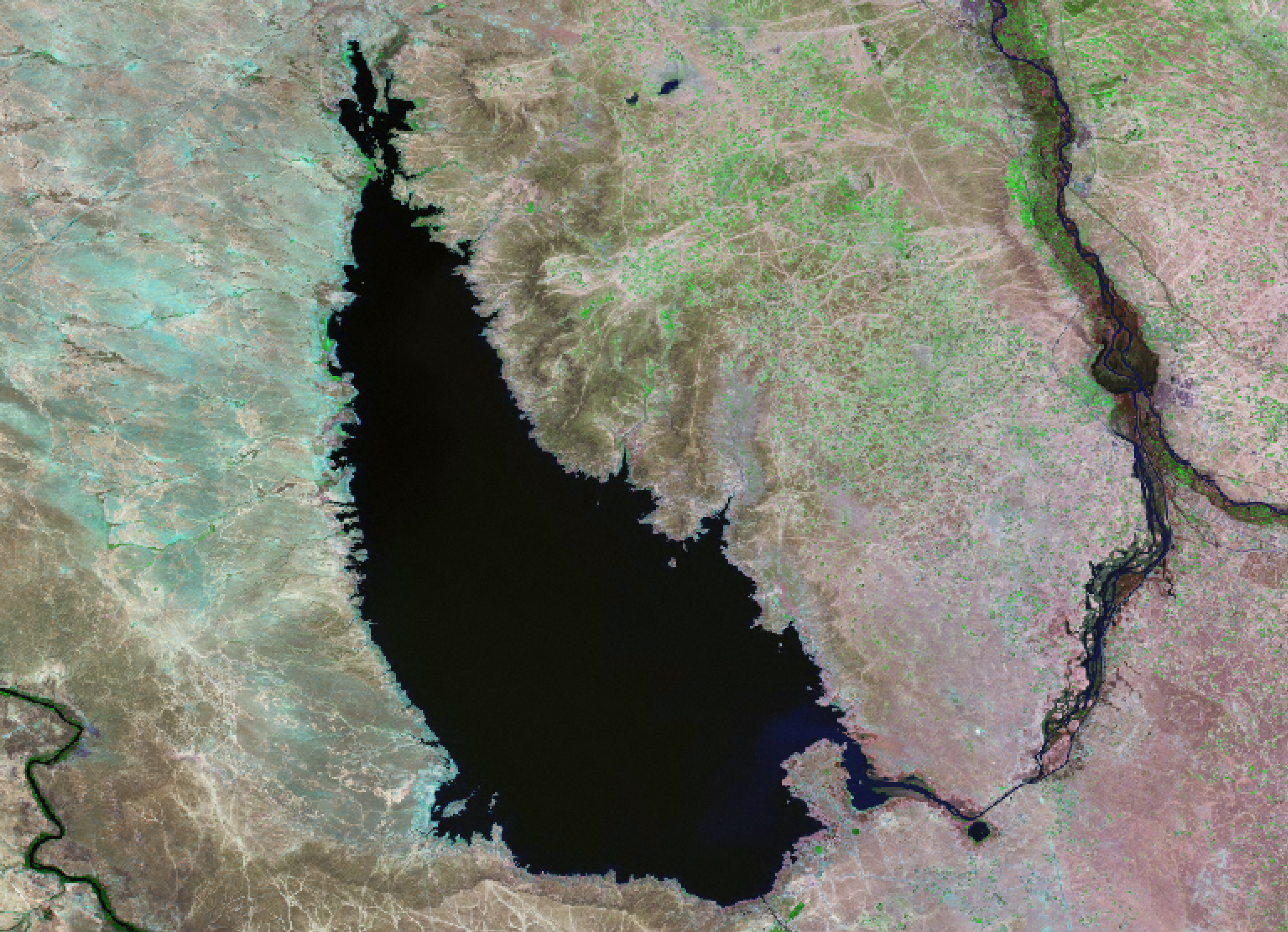
- Landsat 5 (1990)

- Location of Tharthar lake
- Interactive map of Lake Tharthar
- Location: Al Anbar Province
- Coordinates: 33°58′N 43°11′E
- Primary inflows: Tharthar Canal
- Primary outflows: Taksim Tharthar Canal
- Basin countries: Iraq
- Max. length: 120 kilometres (75 mi)
- Max. width: 48 kilometres (30 mi)
- Surface area: 2,710 km^{2} (1,050 sq mi)
- Average depth: 40 m (130 ft) to 65 m (213 ft)
- Water volume: 35.18 km^{3} (8.44 cu mi) to 85.59 km^{3} (20.53 cu mi)
- Surface elevation: 3 metres (9.8 ft)

Lake Tharthar (also Therthar), and known in Iraq as Buhayrat ath-Tharthar (Arabic: بحيرة الثرثار), is an artificial lake created in 1956, situated 100 kilometers (62 mi) northwest of Baghdad between the Tigris and the Euphrates rivers.

== History ==
In 1956, the southern part of the Tharthar depression was turned into an artificial reservoir to collect floodwaters of the Tigris River. The water flows via an artificial inlet canal, named Tharthar Canal. The canal diverts the excess water, by means of a regulator, the Samarra Barrage. It merges with the lake in its southeastern bank.

The lake has an artificial outlet called Taksim Tharthar Canal, which drains to the Euphrates River directly. The canal, after 28 km (17.4 mi) from its outlet, bifurcates to another canal called "Dhira'a Dijla" (Arm of Tigris) that returns water back to the Tigris River.

Lake Tharthar was the site of a joint American-Iraqi raid in 2005 against an insurgent training base in the region. On October 11, 2007, 19 terrorists and 15 civilians were killed by U.S. forces in Lake Tharthar region during an operation targeting senior leaders of Al-Qaeda in Iraq.

== Description ==
The Tharthar depression was formed during the Holocene age, mainly by karstification, due to dissolving of gypsum rocks of the Fatha Formation nearby. Tharthar covers roughly 2,050 km^{2} (790 sq mi) and flows from the central and eastern parts of the Sinjar Mountains and adjacent hills, with a floor of –3m above sea level. The maximum length and width of the depression are 120 and 48 km, respectively. The eastern rim of the depression is higher than the western one; the heights of both rims are 90 metres (300 ft) and 75 metres (246 ft), respectively.

The main purpose of the Tharthar Lake is to collect excess water of the Tigris River during flood seasons and to recharge water to the Tigris and Euphrates Rivers during dry seasons, when there is shortage of water in both rivers. Moreover, it aims to wash out the salts from the stored water in the lake by means of natural continuous draining of the stored water.

== Flora and fauna ==
Tharthar Lake and the surrounding areas are considered one of the most important grazing areas in Iraq, including the wide wheat and corn fields covering the area. The area harbors many species of animals and vegetation.

=== Birds ===
Tharthar Lake is considered the main wintering grounds for many threatened species of migrant birds such as saker falcon, MacQueen's bustard, and sociable lapwing. Fifty-four bird species were seen in Tharthar lake including the pallid harrier, European roller, and black-tailed godwit. All these near threatened species were recorded on passage and the endemic race of hooded crow [Corvus cornix capellanus] was present.

=== Mammals ===
Golden jackals have been observed regularly at the site. Striped hyenas and caracals were reported by local people near the lake edge.

=== Reptiles ===
Many species of reptiles have been observed such as Turkish gecko and Egyptian spiny-tailed lizard.

=== Fish ===
Ten fish species have been found in the lake including: Aspius vorax, yellowfin barbel, B. luteus, B. sharpeyi, goldfish, Cyprnion kais, common carp, Silurus triostegus, Chondrostoma regium, and Liza abu.

=== Plants ===
Tharthar Lake and the surrounding area contains about 38 species of plants. Four main habitat types observed within the Al-Tharthar Lake and Al Dhebaeji Field area:

- Inland standing water: aquatic communities – rooted submerged vegetation, characterized by Vallisneria spiralis, Potamogeton crispus and Potamogeton perfoliatus.
- Flooded communities: periodically or occasionally flooded land dominated by Cyperus sp., Rumex dentatus, Polygonum argyrocoleon, Polygonum sp. and Bacopa monnieri.
- Marsh vegetation: helophytic vegetation - reedbeds, characterized by Phragmites australis.
- Terrestrial vegetation: desert shrub characterized by Tamarix sp., Alhagi maurorum, Atraplex leucoclada and Cornulaca aucheri.

== See also ==
- Lake Habbaniyah
- Lake Milh
- Lake Qadisiyah
- Mosul Dam
- List of dams and reservoirs in Iraq
- Wildlife of Iraq
