= Hugh Hamilton Brookes =

British Royal Air Force officer (1904–1988)

Air Vice-Marshal Hugh Hamilton Brookes CB CBE DFC
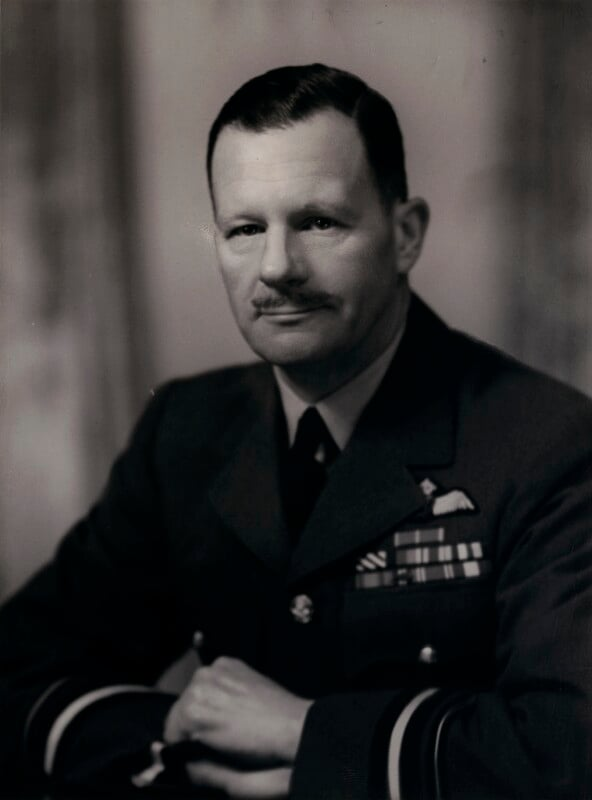
- Brookes in 1953
- Born: 14 October 1904
- Died: 16 March 1988 (aged 83)
- Allegiance: United Kingdom
- Branch: Royal Air Force
- Service years: 1922–1958
- Rank: Air vice-marshal
- Commands: No. 25 Group (1956–58); AHQ Iraq (1954–56); Rhodesian Air Training Group (1951–53); RAF Swinderby (1948–49); RAF Breighton (1943–46); No. 298 Wing (1942–43); No. 39 Squadron (1939–40)
- Conflicts: World War II
- Awards: Companion of the Order of the Bath; Commander of the Order of the British Empire; Distinguished Flying Cross; Mentioned in dispatches (2)

Air Vice-Marshal Hugh Hamilton Brookes CB, CBE, DFC (14 October 1904 – 16 March 1988) was a senior Royal Air Force officer.

== Biography ==
Born on 14 October 1904, Hugh Hamilton Brookes was educated at Bedford School and at the Royal Air Force College Cranwell. After serving in Iraq, the Western Desert, Aden and with Bomber Command during World War II, he was appointed as Air Officer Commanding Rhodesia from 1951 to 1954, Air Officer Commanding Iraq from 1954 to 1956, and Air Officer Commanding No. 25 Group from 1956 to 1958.

Brookes retired from the Royal Air Force on 10 November 1958. He died on 16 March 1988.
