= Sirwan River =

River in Iran and Iraq

Coordinates: 33.2208°N 44.5064°E

Sîrwan (Continues in Iraq as Diyala river)
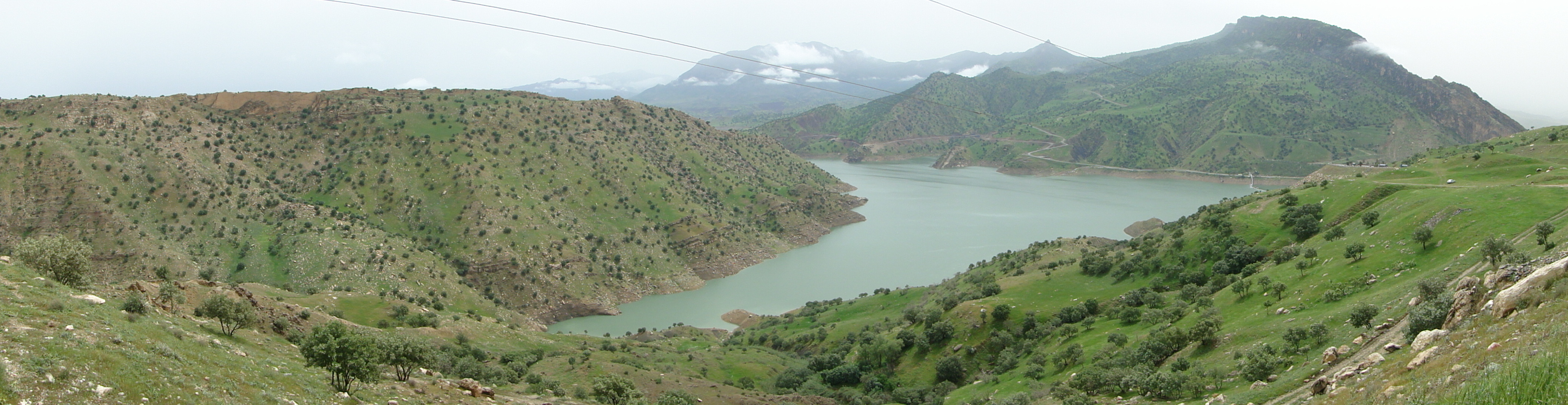
- Sirwin River

Location
- Country: Iran/Iraq

Physical characteristics
- Source
  - location: Western Iran
- Mouth
  - location: Tigris River
- Length: 445 km (277 mi)
- Basin size: 32,600 km^{2} (12,600 sq mi)

The Sirwan (Kurdish: Sîrwan, Sorani Kurdish: سيروان, Arabic: نهر ديالى, Persian: سیروان) is a river and tributary of the Tigris that originates in Iran. The Sirwan (or Sirvan) then runs mainly through eastern Iraq. It covers a total distance of 445 km (277 mi).

== Course ==
It rises near Hamadan, in the Zagros Mountains of Iran. Descending through the mountains, for some 32 km it forms the Iran-Iraq border. It finally feeds into the Tigris below Baghdad. Navigation of the upper reaches of the Diyala is not possible because of its narrow defiles, but the river's valley provides an important trade route between Iran and Iraq.

== History ==
The river is mentioned in Herodotus' Histories under the name Gyndes, where it is stated that the king Cyrus the Great dispersed it by digging 360 channels as punishment after a sacred white horse perished there. The river returned to its former proportions after the channels disappeared under the sand. The Battle of Diyala River took place in 693 BC between the forces of the Neo-Assyrian Empire and the Elamites of southern Iran.

== Name ==
Its origin in Kurdish and Persian is called "Sirwan", meaning 'roaring sea' or 'shouting river', as well as being the name of an ancient city near Ilam city in Iran. Upon its confluence with the Tanjaro river in Darbandikhan Dam in the Sulaymaniyah Governorate of Northern Iraq, its name changes to Diyala River. In the Sasanian and early Islamic eras, the lower course of the river formed part of the Nahrawan Canal. The Diyala Governorate in Iraq is named after the river.

== Dams ==
In Iran, Daryan Dam was finished in 2018 near Daryan in Kermanshah province. The purpose of the dam is to divert a significant portion of the river to Southwestern Iran for irrigation through the 48 km (30 mi) long Nosoud Water Conveyance Tunnel and to produce hydroelectric power. In Iraq, the river first reaches the Darbandikhan Dam which generates hydroelectric power and stores water for irrigation. It then flows down to the Hemrin Dam for similar purposes. In the lower Diyala Valley near Baghdad the river is controlled by the Diyala Weir which controls floods and irrigates the area northeast of Baghdad.

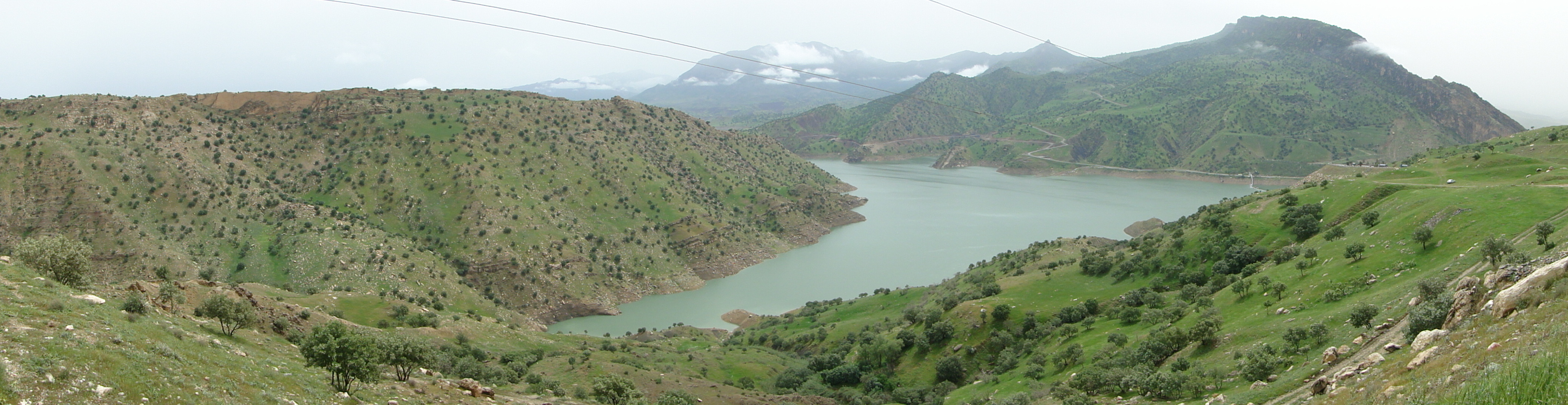
Lake Darbandikhan

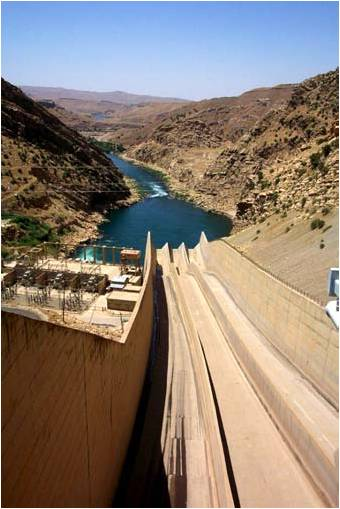
Darbandikhan Dam

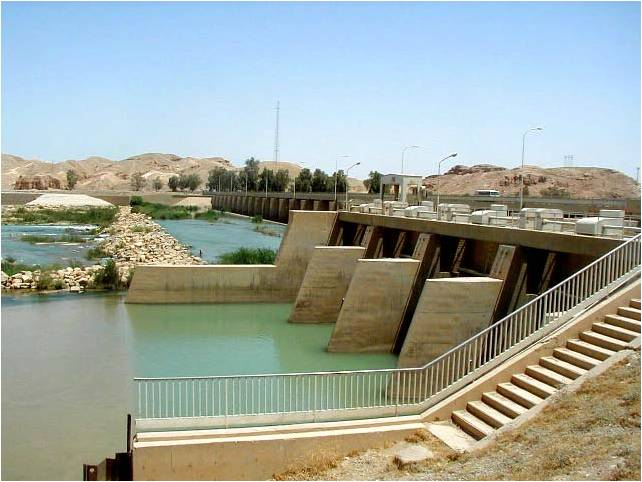
Diyala Weir
