= List of dams and reservoirs in Iraq =

Dams and barrages in Iraq (clickable map)

The following is a list of dams and reservoirs in Iraq. They are sorted according to their location in either the Euphrates or the Tigris river basin.

== Dams in the Euphrates basin ==
- Duban Regulator, on the Euphrates, regulating the flow of the Euphrates into Lake Habbaniyah
- Fallujah Barrage, on the Euphrates
- Haditha Dam, on the Euphrates, creating Lake Qadisiyah
- Hindiya Barrage, on the Hindiya branch of the Euphrates
- Ramadi Barrage, on the Euphrates
- Warrar Regulator, on the Euphrates
- Three dams in Wadi Hauran (Hussayniyah dam, Rutba dam, and the Hauran dam)

== Dams in the Tigris basin ==
- Adhaim Dam, on the Adhaim River
- Alwand Dam, on the Alwand River
- Badush Dam (incomplete), on the Tigris
- Bastora Dam (under construction), on the Bastora River
- Bawanur Dam (under construction), on the Diyala River
- Beduhe Dam, on the Beduhe River
- Bekhme Dam (incomplete), on the Great Zab
- Darbandikhan Dam, on the Diyala River
- Deralok Dam (under construction), on the Great Zab
- Dibis Dam, on the Little Zab
- Diyala Weir, on the Diyala River
- Dukan Dam, on the Little Zab, creating Lake Dukan
- Duhok Dam, on the Duhok River
- Hemrin Dam, on the Diyala River, creating Lake Hamrin
- Kut Barrage, on the Tigris
- Mosul Dam, on the Tigris
- Samarra Dam, on the Tigris

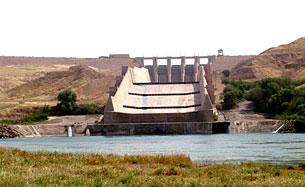
Spillway of the Mosul Dam

== Dams in waterways connecting the Tigris and Euphrates basins ==
- Badaa Head Regulator, on the Shatt al-Hayy
- Gharraf Head regulator, on the Shatt al-Hayy
- Gharraf Regulators, on the Shatt al-Hayy
- Shallala Weir, on a canal from Lake Tharthar to the Tigris
- Tharthar Diversion Structure, regulating the flow from Lake Tharthar
- Thartar Canal Control Structure, regulating the flow from Lake Tharthar toward either the Euphrates or the tigris

== See also ==
- List of rivers of Iraq
