= List of rivers of Iraq =

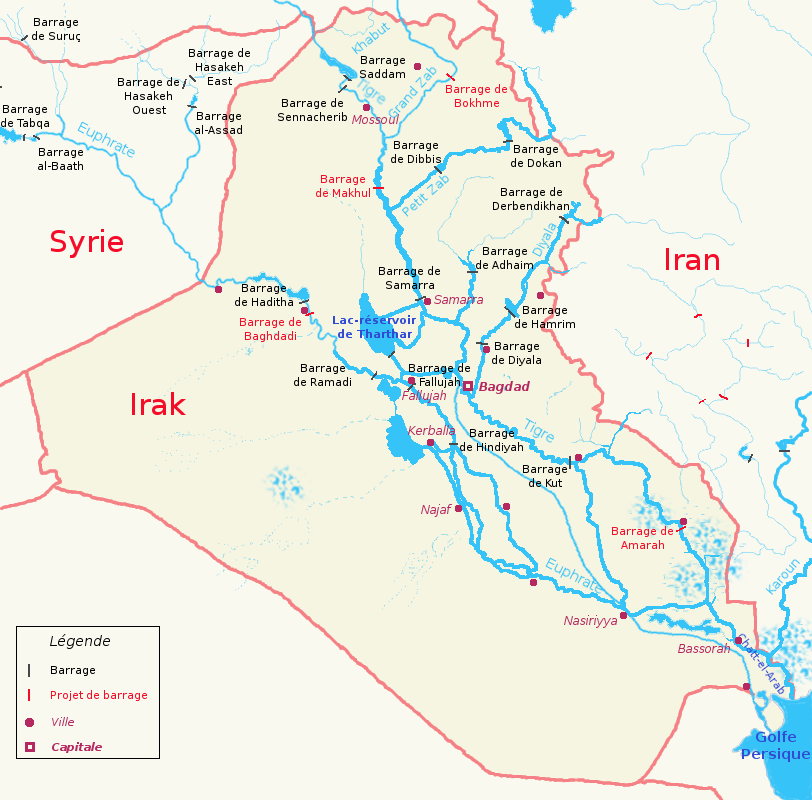
Iraq's major river systems (French language map).

This is a list of rivers of Iraq.

== Persian Gulf ==
- Shatt al-Arab
  - Euphrates
    - Shatt al-Hayy or Gharraf Canal, distributary of the Tigris
    - Wadi al-Khirr
    - Wadi al-Ubayyid
    - Wadi al-Ghadaf
    - Wadi Tharthar
    - Wadi Hauran
  - Tigris
    - Diyala River
    - Khasa River
    - 'Adhaim
    - Little Zab
    - Great Zab
      - Khazir River
    - Khabur River
    - Dujaila River

== Syrian Desert ==
- Wadi al-Mirah
- Wadi Hamir
- Wadi Ar'ar
- Wadi al Batin

== See also ==
- List of dams and reservoirs in Iraq
- Water supply and sanitation in Iraq
