= Electricity sector in Iraq =

Electricity sector of Iraq
Data
- Installed capacity (2022): 30 GW
- Production (2023): 144,694 GWh
- Share of fossil energy: 98%
- Share of renewable energy: 2%

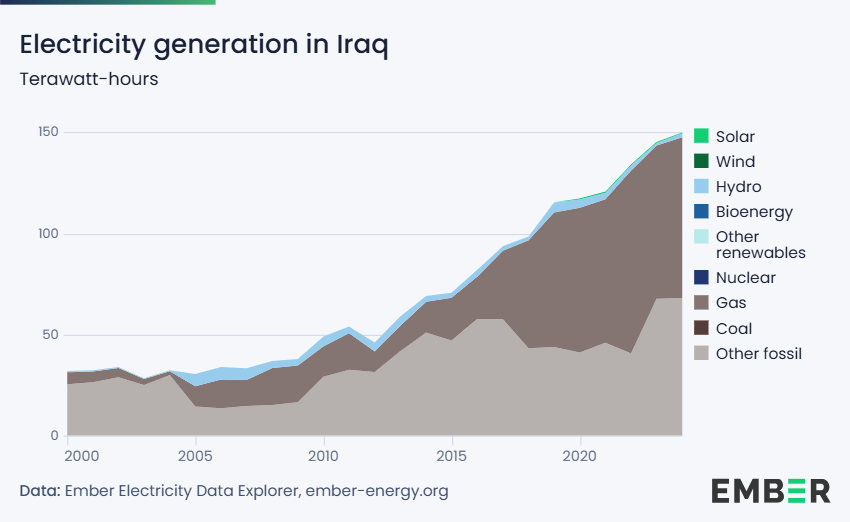
Electricity generation in Iraq in terawatt-hours

Iraq's electricity generation primarily depends on fossil fuels. In 2023, natural gas was the largest source at 52% of the total, followed by oil at 47%. Renewable energy, mainly from hydroelectric power, contributed 1%. As of 2023, the 30 gigawatts (GW) of installed capacity cannot meet summer peak demand. A net 10% of electricity is imported.

In 2021, the majority of Iraq's electricity consumption was attributed to the residential sector, which used 65.0% of the total. This was followed by the commercial and public services sector at 21.6%, and industrial activities at 11.2%. The smallest share was consumed by the agriculture and forestry sector, accounting for only 2.2%.

According to the United States Department of Energy officials, demand for electricity has been stimulated by a growing economy and a surge in consumer purchases of appliances and electronics. In addition, electricity is subsidized in Iraq, which leads to increased demand.

Due to a weak grid and institutional problems many consumers use small generators or rooftop solar panels.

== History ==
Electricity entered Iraq for the first time in 1917 where the first electric machine was installed in the Khan Dala building.

Prior to the Gulf War, the total installed generating capacity was 5,100 MW, which fell to about 2,300 MW after the Gulf War. Approximately 87% of the population had access to electricity. A combination of wars, sanctions, looting and vandalism has however, severely affected the entire power system infrastructure in Iraq.

During the 1991 Gulf War, the electricity system suffered severe damage. Several transmission lines were put out of service, electrical substations were damaged. While some of the damage of the 1991 war was repaired and about 4,500 MW of generating capacity was available in 1999 when Iraq reorganized its electricity sector. The sector was separated from the Ministry of Industry, and the Commission of Electricity (CoE) was established on June 21, 1999. About 4,500 MW of generating capacity became available by the end of 2002, power supply remained insufficient and unreliable. Programmed load shedding and unplanned power outages were frequent.

=== Post 2003 war ===
Although the power system was not significantly affected by the last conflict, capacity was reduced to approximately 3,300 MW by a combination of further breakdowns, lack of spares and interruption of major maintenance cycles. The balance between generation versus demand as reported on 18 July 2004 by the Coalition Project Contracting Office (PCO) (agency responsible for Coalition projects following the Coalition Provisional Authority [CPA], which completed its mandate as of 30 June 2004) is as follows:

- Daily electricity demand: 6,400 MW
- Daily average output: 4,470 MW
- Summer peak demand 6,800–7,500 MW; 35 to 40% of the summer peak demand cannot be satisfied at present.

Lack of electricity tends to affect more severely the most vulnerable groups of Iraq's society and increases their morbidity and mortality. Ongoing efforts need to be maintained and new actions to increase electricity supply need to be initiated. In addition, significant delays have been occurring in the reconstruction work that is underway and more security related bottlenecks are expected. Baghdad, a city of 6 million (representing 1/3 of Iraq's population) is still subjected to programmed load shedding on a rolling basis (roughly 3 hours on 3 hours off).

This is often exacerbated by unforeseen events. For example, on 2 June and 26 July 2004, segments of Baghdad were left without power for 16 and 21 hours, respectively.

These events took place in weather that is exceedingly hot. In a country with 39.7% of its population under 15 years, these events do not go unnoticed and the need to add generating capacity to the grid is most pressing.

Prewar Baghdad had electricity 16 to 24 hours per day and was favored for distribution. The remainder of Iraq received 4–8 hours of electricity per day.

After the war, Baghdad no longer has priority, and therefore both Baghdad and the country as a whole received on average 15.5 hours of electricity per day as of February 2010.

=== Statistics ===
Year	Annual consumption per person	Installed capacity (MW)	Demand	Peak demand
1955		50		
1990	1,700 kWh	5100		
2003	900 kWh	3300		
2003 June	700 kWh	4470	6400	7500
2006		4280	8180	
2008		6000	10000	
2010		8000	14000	
2016		13000	21000	

== Generation ==
The 1990 installed capacity of 9,295 MW consisted of 120 power-generating units in various thermal, gas turbine and hydroelectric power stations. Approximately 70% of Iraq's installed power generating capacity was damaged or destroyed during the 1991 Gulf War. All major power stations were damaged and nearly 80% of the gas turbines units were affected. After 1991, only about 50 units were available, with a generation capacity of 2,325 MW. The construction work on three new large thermal power stations at Yousifiya, Al-Shemal and Al-Anbar were stopped, because of the ensuing sanctions.

Station type	No.	Name plate rating (MW)	Actual rating (MW)
Thermal	8	5,415	1,600
Gas turbines	14	2,181	650
Hydro	7	2,518	650
Diesel plants	3	87	87
Total	32	10,206	3,137

=== Thermal power stations ===
The majority of the power plants in Iraq were built between the mid-1970s and 1980s, with a few small gas-fired plants commissioned in 2003. The majority of the existing power plants are thermal plants that use crude oil supported by gas-fired and hydro plants.

- Al Dora
- Al Taji
- Musayab Thermal Power Station Musayab TPS (4 x 300 MW units) was commissioned in 1987 with major portions of the plant equipment supplied by Hitachi, Japan.
- Yousfiyya power station 660 MW
- Diwaniyya power station 250 MW
- Rumaila power station 500 MW
- Samawa power station 60 MW, $100-million built by Japan

=== Gas power stations ===
- Al Quds power station located in Rashidiyah area, northeast Baghdad with 10 units of capacity 800 MW when fully operational.

=== Hydro-power stations ===
- Mosul Dam
- Haditha Dam
- Dukan Dam
- Darbandikhan Dam

=== Imports ===
- Jordan, tariff is 1 US cent per kWh
- Turkey, tariff 5.58 US cent per kWh
- Iran: As of January 2011 Iraq imports 650 MW of electricity from Iran.
- Kuwait

More import from the electricity sector in Turkey is planned for the 2020s.

=== Local diesel generators ===
These are either small generators for a capacity of a house or large enough to supply a block of houses within the neighborhood supplying power for monthly fees, 14.2 US cent/kWh.

== Iraq rebuilding projects ==
As of June 2014, Iraq spent about US$27 billion between 2003 and 2012 to rehabilitate the power sector after decades of war and sanctions, but widespread corruption in the country has hindered development efforts and power outages continue. In 2005, the World Bank estimated that US$12 billion would be needed for near-term restoration, and the Ministry of Electricity estimated that US$35 billion would be necessary to rebuild the system fully.

- General Electric PPHM contract of US$3 billion. Under the agreement, GE Energy will provide multi-fuel gas turbines capable of supplying 7,000 MW of electricity.
- Emergency rehabilitation of Musayyib Power Station – Stage II, location nationwide, project cost US$33 million. Duration 24 months, Starting Date June 2005, Completion Date June 2009.
- Al Hartha power station, Basrah, a project will double the output of the Hartha station from 400 MW to 800 MW, the total cost of the project is estimated at US$150 million which is funded by World Bank.
- Dora power station; rehabilitation Unit 5 & 6 (steam turbine, 160 MW each) $90.8 million JO-03-037-08 by Bechtel, personnel assistance and training for MoE $80 million JO-04-503-03.
- Dukan and Darbandikhan emergency Hydro Power Project with cost US$37.5 million.
- In October 2010, it was announced that a Turkey energy company, Calik Enerji, has signed a contract, worth of US$445 million, with the Iraqi government to build a power generating station in Al Khairat, Karbala city in central Iraq.The generating capacity of the station amounts to 1,250 MW.
- In October 2010, Enka Insaat won a US$267.5 million deal to build a power plant and install six turbines in Ninawa Governorate in northern Iraq.
- In October 2010, MoE announced that Eastern Lights will install four turbines in an existing plant in Baghdad under a contract worth US$204.8 million.
- Iranian company Tavanir has built Al Sadr Power Plant and is currently expanding it to 640 MW. Iran also plans to build 2000 MW of installed capacity in Iraq and increase its export to Iraq to 1250 MW by summer 2012.

== Economics ==
The IMF estimate that in 2020 less than half of supplied electricity was billed and less than a quarter paid for.

== See also ==
- List of power stations in Iraq
