= Bawanur Dam =

Dam in Sulaymaniyah, Iraq

- Location of the Bawanur Dam Bawanur Dam (Iraqi Kurdistan)
- Country: Iraq; Kurdistan Region
- Location: Bawanur in Sulaymaniyah Governorate
- Coordinates: 34°50′29.07″N 045°31′49.74″E
- Purpose: Power, irrigation, flood control
- Status: Under construction
- Construction began: 2013
- Opening date: 2018 est.
- Construction cost: US$200 million
- Owner: Kurdistan Regional Government

Dam and spillways
- Type of dam: Embankment, earth-fill
- Impounds: Diyala River
- Height: 23 m (75 ft)
- Length: 1,190 m (3,900 ft)
- Elevation at crest: 300 m (980 ft)
- Width (crest): 9 m (30 ft)
- Width (base): 148 m (486 ft)
- Dam volume: 1,108,000 m^{3} (1,449,000 cu yd)

Reservoir
- Total capacity: 31,000,000 m^{3} (25,000 acre⋅ft)
- Catchment area: 20,142 km^{2} (7,777 mi^{2})
- Surface area: 4.15 km^{2} (1.60 mi^{2})

Power Station
- Commission date: 2018 est.
- Type: Run-of-the-river
- Hydraulic head: 16 m (52 ft) (net)
- Turbines: 4 x 8 MW Kaplan-type
- Installed capacity: 32 MW

The Bawanur Dam is an earth-fill dam under construction on the Sirwa River, just upstream of the town of Bawanur in Sulaymaniyah Governorate, Kurdistan Region, Iraq. The 23 m (75 ft) tall dam is designed to support a 32 MW run-of-the-river hydroelectric power station. In addition to power generation, the project aims to provide flood control and irrigation water.

Construction works initially began in August 2013 after the Kurdistan Regional Government signed a US$200 million contract with the Romanian firm Hidroconstrucția for the construction of the dam and power station. However, work was later suspended due to the financial crisis in the Kurdistan Region.

Construction activities resumed in February 2025. Following the 2021 earthquake in Iran, whose seismic effects were felt at Darbandikhan Dam and in the Bawanur Dam project area, the dam is currently undergoing redesign studies. The redesign process is being carried out by a consortium of Turkish companies to reassess structural safety and seismic considerations.

== See also ==
- List of dams and reservoirs in Iraq
- List of power stations in Iraq
