= Timeline of Duhok =

The following is a timeline of the history of the city of Duhok, Iraq.

== Prior to 21st century ==
- 1842 - Dohuk was joined to Mosul Vilayet .
- 1873 - Duhok was becoming District followed Mosul Vilayet.
- 1918 - Duhok occupied by British forces on November.
- 1928 - The first primary school for girls was opened .
- 1936 - Ali Afandi became first Director Municipality of Duhok .
- 1962 - Badirkhanya Library established .
- 1969 - Ageed Sediq Sedullah Amedi became first Governor of Duhok.
- 1970 - Duhok SC (football club) formed .
- 1978 - Duhok Chamber of Commerce and industry founded.
- 1988 - Duhok Dam built .
- 1991 - 14 March: Uprising against Saddam Hussein.
- 1992 - 31 October:University of Duhok established.

== 21st century ==
- 2011 – Many stores selling alcohol and massage parlours crashed by many angry Kurds
- 2012 - The Duhok Polytechnic University established .
- 2014 - The American University of Kurdistan established .
- 2017 - A fire destroys almost 90 stores in Duhok Bzaaar .
- 2019 - 4 May: Shahidan Mosque built .
