= Garan Dam =

Dam in Marivan, Kurdistan, Iran

- Interactive map of Garan Dam
- Country: Iran
- Location: Marivan, Marivan County, Kurdistan Province
- Purpose: Irrigation
- Status: Operational
- Construction began: 2002
- Opening date: 2013; 13 years ago
- Owner: Kordestan Regional Water Authority

Dam and spillways
- Type of dam: Embankment, earth-fill
- Impounds: Garan River
- Height: 62 m (203 ft)
- Length: 504 m (1,654 ft)
- Width (crest): 8 m (26 ft)

Reservoir
- Total capacity: 110,000,000 m^{3} (89,000 acre⋅ft)

The Garan Dam (Persian: سد گاران) is an earth-fill embankment dam on the Garan River, a tributary of the Sirvan River, about 15 km (9.3 mi) northeast of Marivan in Kurdistan Province, Iran. Construction on the dam began in 2002 and it was inaugurated by Iranian President Mahmoud Ahmadinejad on 12 April 2013. It is 62 m (203 ft) tall and impounds a reservoir with a storage capacity of 110,000,000 m^{3} (89,000 acre⋅ft). The primary purpose of the dam is to supply water for the irrigation of 10,450 ha (25,800 acres) in Marivan County. It also provides municipal water to the city of Marivan. Officials in Iraq are concerned that the Garan Dam will have a negative impact on the Sirvan River (called the Diyala River in Iraq) as it feeds the Iraqi Darbandikhan Dam and farmlands below it.

== Gallery ==
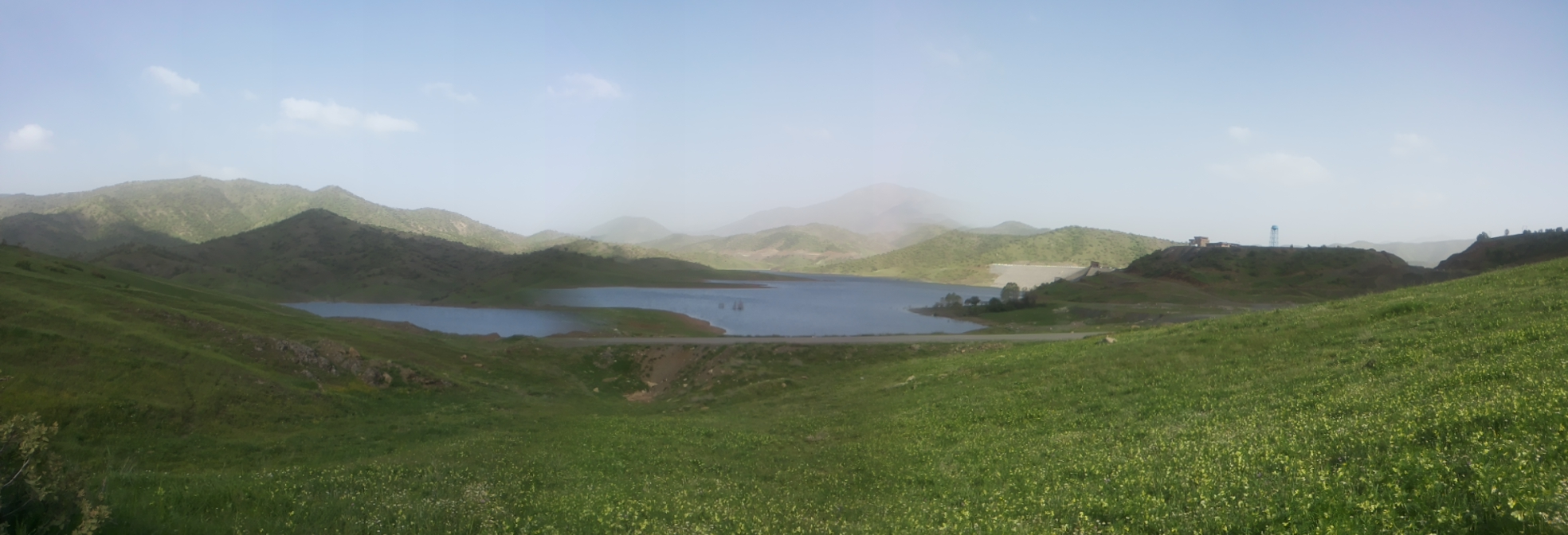
Landscape of the area

== See also ==
- Daryan Dam – downstream on the Sirvan
- Dams in Iran
