= Demographics of Kurdistan Region =

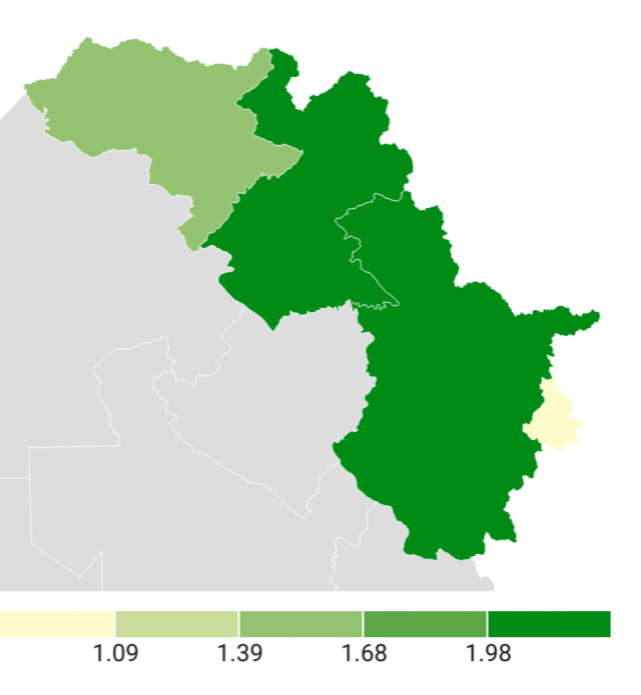
- Kurdistan Region Governorate population (millions), 2021
- Population: 6,556,752
  - Year: 2023
  - Source: "Population". Kurdistan Region Statistics Office. KRSO.
- Density: 139.9162/km^{2}
- Growth rate: 2.0%
- Birth rate: 154,991; 23.6/1,000 population
- Death rate: 24,476; 3.7/1,000 population
- Life expectancy: 75.7 years
  - male: 74.3 years
  - female: 77.1 years
- Fertility rate: 3.8 children born/woman

Age structure
- 0–14 years: 36.0%
- 15–64 years: 60.0%
- 65 and over: 4.0%

Nationality
- Nationality: Iraqi
- Major ethnic: Kurds
- Minor ethnic: Arabs; Turkmens; Assyrians; Armenians

Language
- Official: Kurdish
- Spoken: Arabic (rarely)

The demographics of the Kurdistan Region in Iraq reflect a dynamic interplay of ethnic, cultural, and socioeconomic factors that shape the region's population trends and development trajectory. As of November 2024, the estimated population stood at approximately 6.37 million, rising to 6,556,752 by 2023. The region is characterized by a youthful age structure, a predominantly urban population, and significant demographic shifts due to migration and displacement. Accordingly, the region is currently in stage three (Note: Stage three is characterized by decreasing birth rates, higher life expectancy, increasing urbanization, increasing access to education, increasing access/usage of contraceptives, increasing service sector, increasingly female empowerment/employment, and overall, and increasing development index.) of the Demographic transition theorem.

== Geographical overview ==
Kurdistan Region is characterized by diverse and rugged terrain, including mountains, ravines, and fertile plains. Areas such as Sulaymaniyah are situated at elevations exceeding 890 meters above sea level and experience cold winters with snowfall, as well as mild summers. The region's mountainous landscape is complemented by natural and man-made landmarks, including the Dukan Dam and Darbandikhan Dam, which are also notable tourist destinations.

=== Climate ===
The climate in the Kurdistan Region varies by season, with cold winters and generally mild summers. These climatic conditions are conducive to agriculture, which remains one of the region's primary economic sectors.

The Shahrizor Plain, historically known as "Zamo" during the Akkadian period, is regarded as one of the most fertile areas within the region, reflecting its agricultural significance. The region also contains several natural landmarks, including the Gali Ali Bag Waterfall, considered one of the tallest waterfalls in the Middle East.

== Population overview ==
Population pyramid 2023
%	Males	Age	Females	%
0.2		80+		0.3
0.5		75–79		0.6
0.8		70–74		0.9
1.1		65–69		1.3
1.6		60–64		1.9
2.3		55–59		2.1
2.8		50–54		2.7
3.2		45–49		3.1
4.0		40–44		3.9
4.7		35–39		4.5
5.3		30–34		5.0
6.0		25–29		5.7
6.7		20–24		6.3
7.6		15–19		7.3
7.9		10–14		7.8
8.3		5–9		8.0
8.5		0–4		8.2

As of 2023, the estimated population of the Kurdistan Region was 6,556,752 individuals. The gender distribution is relatively balanced, with 3,296,240 males and 3,260,514 females. The annual population growth rate is approximately 2.0%.

Population by Gender and Area (2023)
Category	Population
Male	3,296,240
Female	3,260,514
Urban	5,142,526
Rural	1,414,226
Total	6,556,752

== Urban and rural distribution ==
A significant majority of the KRI population resides in urban areas. Urbanization rates vary across governorates: Erbil (83%), Duhok (74%), and Sulaymaniyah (85%). This trend is driven by both economic development and historical political instability.

Kurdistan Region's urbanization trend is pronounced, with around 84% of its inhabitants residing in urban areas, while 21.5% live in rural areas; reflecting significant shifts in living patterns and economic structures.

== Population density ==
The Kurdistan Region covers an area of approximately 46,862 square kilometers, resulting in a population density of around 140 individuals per square kilometer.

== Governorate distribution ==
Based on available estimates:

- Sulaymaniyah Governorate hosts the largest population, nearly 2.27 million.
- Erbil Governorate has around 2.25 million residents.
- Duhok Governorate houses approximately 1.65 million.

== Age structure ==
The population of the Kurdistan Region is notably young:

- 0–14 years: 36.0%
- 15–64 years: 60.0%
- 65 years and over: 4.0%

This demographic structure results in a dependency ratio of approximately 63.5%, indicating a sizable proportion of dependents relative to the working-age population.

== Labor force statistics ==
According to the 2021 Labor Force Survey, the labor force participation rate in the KRI is 45.0%. However, there is a stark gender disparity: 73.5% of males participate in the labor force, compared to just 16.5% of females. The overall unemployment rate is 16.5%, with female unemployment (29.6%) significantly higher than that of males (13.6%).

Labor Force Participation and Unemployment rates (2021)
Indicator	Total (%)	Male (%)	Female (%)
Labor Force Participation Rate	45.0	73.5	16.5
Unemployment Rate	16.5	13.6	29.6

However, the region faces considerable challenges, including increasing emigration among young people seeking better opportunities abroad, primarily due to economic stagnation and public sector reliance.

== Fertility and mortality ==
The total fertility rate (TFR) in the KRI is estimated at 3.8 children per woman. However, projections indicate a decline to around 2.5 by 2040. Life expectancy at birth is expected to rise from 73.8 years in 2020 to 77.7 years for males and from 76.6 to 80.7 years for females by 2040. In 2018, the under-5 mortality rate was 17 per 1,000 live births, lower than in other parts of Iraq.

== Migration and displacement ==
The Kurdistan Region has been significantly impacted by regional conflicts, resulting in both internal and external migration. In 2016, the region hosted approximately 1.1 million internally displaced persons (IDPs), 16% of the total KRI population, and 200,000 refugees. Duhok Governorate accounted for the highest share of IDPs (29%), followed by Erbil (11%) and Sulaymaniyah (10%).

== Ethnic and religious composition ==
The KRG is ethnically and religiously diverse. Kurds form the majority, while other groups include Turkmen, Arabs, Assyrians, and Armenians. Most Kurds are Sunni Muslims, though religious minorities such as Yazidis and Christians maintain a significant presence.

=== Language ===
Kurdish is the predominant language in the region and serves as a key element of cultural identity. There are ongoing efforts to promote its use and development, particularly in the context of broader linguistic influences from national languages.

== Population projections ==
Future population projections estimate that the KRI’s population will reach approximately 7 million by 2027 and 8 million by 2034. This represents a projected 43% increase over two decades, with an average annual growth rate of 1.82%.

== Sources ==
- Kurdistan Region Population Analysis Report (PDF). Kurdistan Region Statistics Office (KRSO). Government of the Kurdistan Region. May 2022.
- "Kurdistan Regional Government Data and Statistics". krso.gov.krd. Government of the Kurdistan Region.
