= Battle of Babylon =

Battle of Babylon may refer to:

- Siege of Babylon Fortress, between the forces of Byzantine Empire and Rashidun Caliphate
- Fall of Babylon
- Siege of Babylon
