= Dāryān =

Dāryān or Dārīān or Dāreyān may refer to:

- Daryan, East Azerbaijan, Iran
- Daryan, Kurdistan, Iran
