= Daryan Dam =

Dam in Kermanshah, Iran

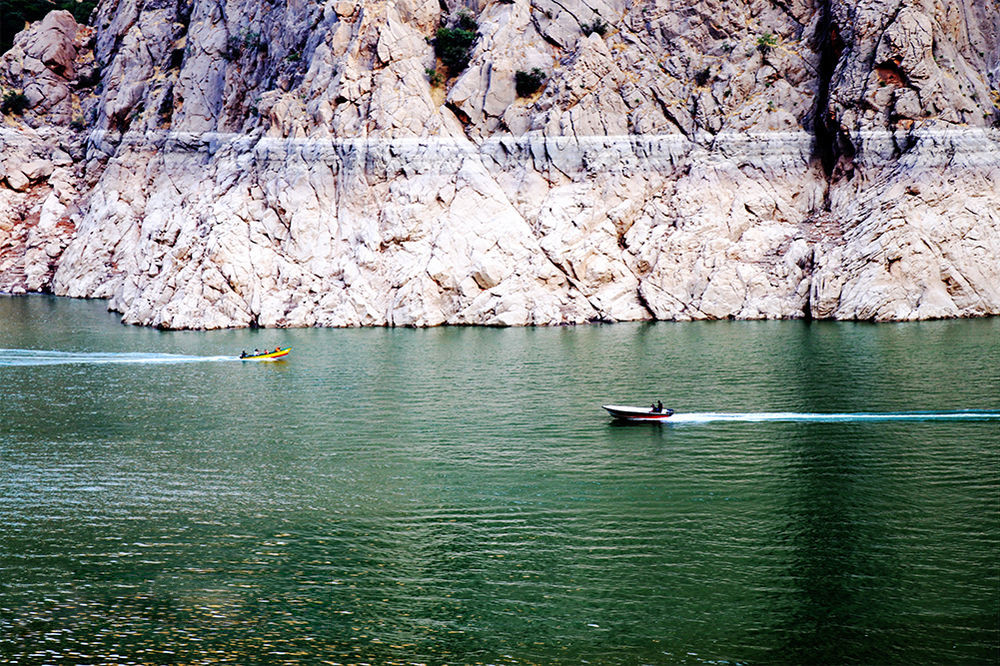
- Interactive map of Daryan Dam
- Country: Iran
- Location: Daryan, Kermanshah Province
- Purpose: Irrigation, Power
- Status: Under construction
- Construction began: 2009
- Opening date: 2018
- Owners: Iran Water and Power Resources Development Co

Dam and spillways
- Type of dam: Embankment, rock-fill with clay-core
- Impounds: Sirvan River
- Height (foundation): 169 m (554 ft)
- Height (thalweg): 146 m (479 ft)
- Length: 368 m (1,207 ft)
- Dam volume: 9,700,000 m^{3} (7,864 acre⋅ft)

Reservoir
- Total capacity: 316,300,000 m^{3} (256,429 acre⋅ft)
- Active capacity: 281,000,000 m^{3} (227,810 acre⋅ft)
- Surface area: 10 km^{2} (4 mi^{2})
- Maximum width: 800 m (2,625 ft)

Power Station
- Commission date: 2018
- Turbines: 3 x 70 MW Francis-type
- Installed capacity: 210 MW

The Daryan Dam, also spelled Darian (Persian: سد داریان), is an embankment dam constructed on the Sirvan River just north of Daryan in Paveh County, Kermanshah province, Iran. The primary purpose of the dam is to supply up to 1,378,000,000 m^{3} (1,117,000 acre⋅ft) of water annually to the 48 km (30 mi) long Nowsud Water Conveyance Tunnel where it will irrigate areas of Southwestern Iran. The dam also has a 210 MW hydroelectric power station. Construction on the dam began in 2009 and the dam began to fill its reservoir in late November 2015. The Darian Dam Archaeological Salvage Program (DDASP) was planned by Iranian Center for Archaeological Research before flooding the reservoir. As a result, a number of important archaeological sites were discovered and some were excavated. The power station was commissioned in 2018. The dam's diversion tunnel was completed in June 2011. The dam was designed by Quds Niru and consultation was provided by Mahab Ghods and Quds Niru, International Consulting Engineering Co. In August 2010 Farab Co. won the contract to build the power station. In 2011, workers on the project held a protest against unpaid wages. The dam is also the subject of protest due to the forced relocations and ecological/cultural impact its reservoir will have.

== Reservoir volume reduction ==
The Darian Dam project was planned through studies to have a reservoir volume of one billion cubic meters, But in order to preserve the village of Hajij, respect the religious beliefs of the people, and preserve the historical monuments of the region, especially Imamzade Obaidullah Hajij, the height of the Darian Dam was reduced by 50 meters.

One of the goals of building the Darian Dam was to reduce the inequality in the water consumption of the Sirwan and Diyala River in Iraq and Iran. In Iraq, the Diyala Weir and several large reservoir dams with a total reservoir volume of 5071 million cubic meters have been built on this river. The decrease in the reservoir volume of the Darian dam in Iran caused the total reservoir volume of Iran's dams on this river to reach 440 million cubic meters, which is much less than the water consumption on the Iraqi side of this river.

Another problem caused by the reduction in the volume of the Sirvan Dam is the reduction of the water flow of the Sirvan River in the downstream areas during the dry seasons, which occurs with the increase in the water demand of the Sirvan River in the upstream. This issue has several times led to Iraqi officials blaming the Iranian side for the reduced flow of this river during the dry seasons of the year.

== See also ==
- Dams in Iran
- List of dams and reservoirs in Iran
- List of power stations in Iran
- Garan Dam
