= List of power stations in Iraq =

Below is a list of power stations in Iraq.

== Non-renewable ==
=== Thermal ===
Name .	Location	Capacity (MW)	Notes
Nassiriyah power plant	Nassiriyah	840	
Al-Mussaib	Babil	1,280	
Doura	Baghdad	640	
Bayji	Saladin	1,320	
South Baghdad	Baghdad	355	
Al-Shemal	Mosul	2,100	
Al-Hartha	Basra Governorate	400	
An Nassiriyah	Dhiqar	840	
Besmaya	Baghdad		

=== Natural gas ===
Name	Location	Capacity (MW)	Type	Notes
Mulla Abdulla (New)	Kirkuk Governorate	222	Open-cycle	
Khor Al Zubayr	Basra Governorate	252	Open-cycle	
Al-Mansurya	Diyala Governorate	728	Open-cycle	
Al-Anbar	Al-Anbar Governorate	1,642.6	Combined-cycle	
Shatt Al-Basra	Basra Governorate	1,900	Combined-cycle	
Erbil	Erbil Governorate	1,500	Combined-cycle	
Erbil - Khabat	Erbil Governorate	300	Combined-cycle	
South Baghdad 1	Baghdad Governorate	246	Open-cycle	
South Baghdad 2	Baghdad Governorate	400	Open-cycle	
Daura 1	Baghdad Governorate	146	Open-cycle	
Daura 2	Baghdad Governorate	750	Open-cycle	
Al-Rasheed 1	Baghdad Governorate	94	Open-cycle	
Taji 1	Baghdad Governorate	156	Open-cycle	
Taji 2	Baghdad Governorate	160	Open-cycle	
Sadr	Baghdad Governorate	160	Open-cycle	
Al-Quds 1	Baghdad Governorate	450	Open-cycle	
Al-Quds 2	Baghdad Governorate	450	Open-cycle	
Al-Quds 3	Baghdad Governorate	500	Open-cycle	
Al-Najybia	Basra Governorate	500	Open-cycle	
Sulaymaniyah	Sulaymaniyah Governorate	1,500	Combined-cycle	
Dohuk	Dohuk Governorate	500	Open-cycle	
Rumaila	Basra Governorate	1,460	Open-cycle	
Taza	Kirkuk Governorate	292	Open-cycle	
Hilla	Babil Governorate	250	Open-cycle	
Karbala	Karbala Governorate	250	Open-cycle	
Al-Najaf	Najaf Governorate	250	Open-cycle	

== Renewable ==
=== Hydroelectric ===
Name	Location	Capacity (MW)	Type	Notes
Adhaim Dam	Saladin Governorate	27	Conventional	
Darbandikhan Dam	Sulaymaniyah Governorate	249	Conventional	
Dukan Dam	Sulaymaniyah Governorate	400	Conventional	
Haditha Dam	Al Anbar Governorate	660	Conventional	
Hemrin Dam	Diyala Governorate	50	Conventional	Operational
Samarra Barrage	Salah ad Din Governorate	84	Conventional	Operational
Mosul Dam	Nineveh Governorate	1,052	Conventional	
Mosul Dam Regulator	Nineveh Governorate	62	Run-of-the-river	

== See also ==
- Energy policy of Iraq
- Electricity sector in Iraq
- List of largest power stations in the world
