= Siege of Babylon =

689 BC siege in the Neo-Assyrian Empire

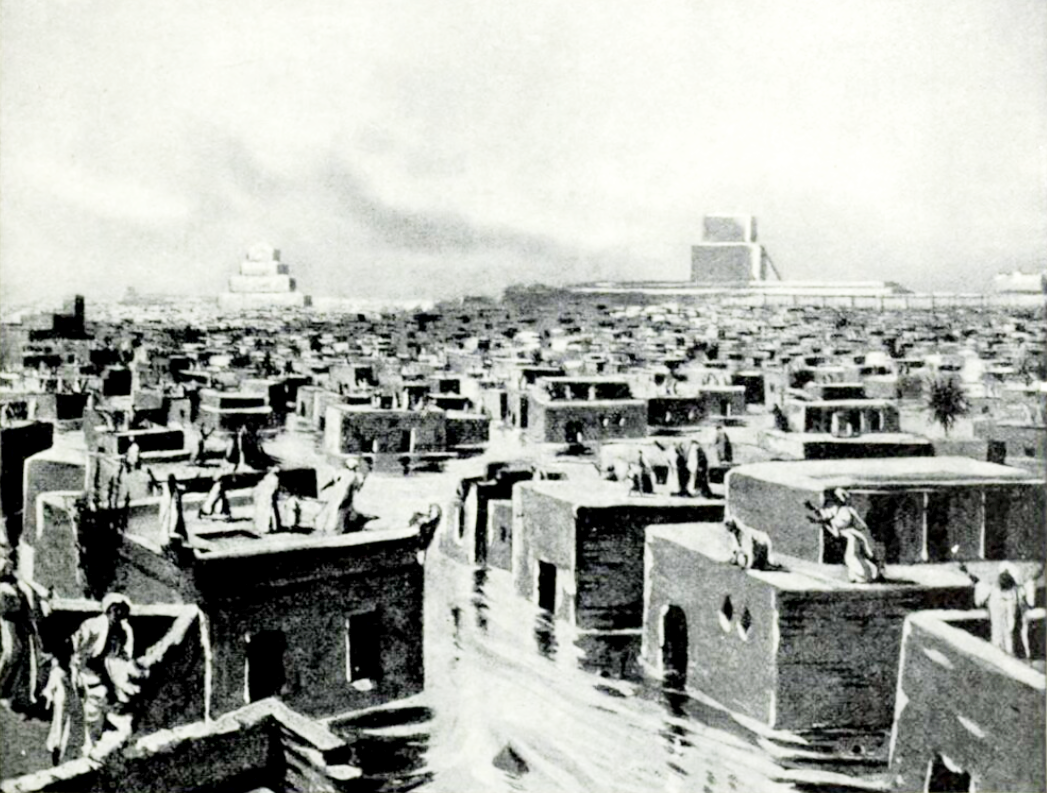
- 20th-century illustration of Sennacherib's destruction of Babylon
Date	689 BC
Location	Babylon
Result	Assyrian victory: Destruction of Babylon

Belligerents
Babylonians	Assyrians

Commanders and leaders
Mushezib-Marduk	Sennacherib

The siege of Babylon in 689 BC took place after the victory of Assyrian King Sennacherib over the Elamites at the Battle of River Diyala. Although the Assyrians had suffered heavy casualties at the river, they had beaten the Elamites and so the Babylonians now stood alone. Sennacherib then successfully besieged Babylon for up to fifteen months and destroyed it.

== Assault ==
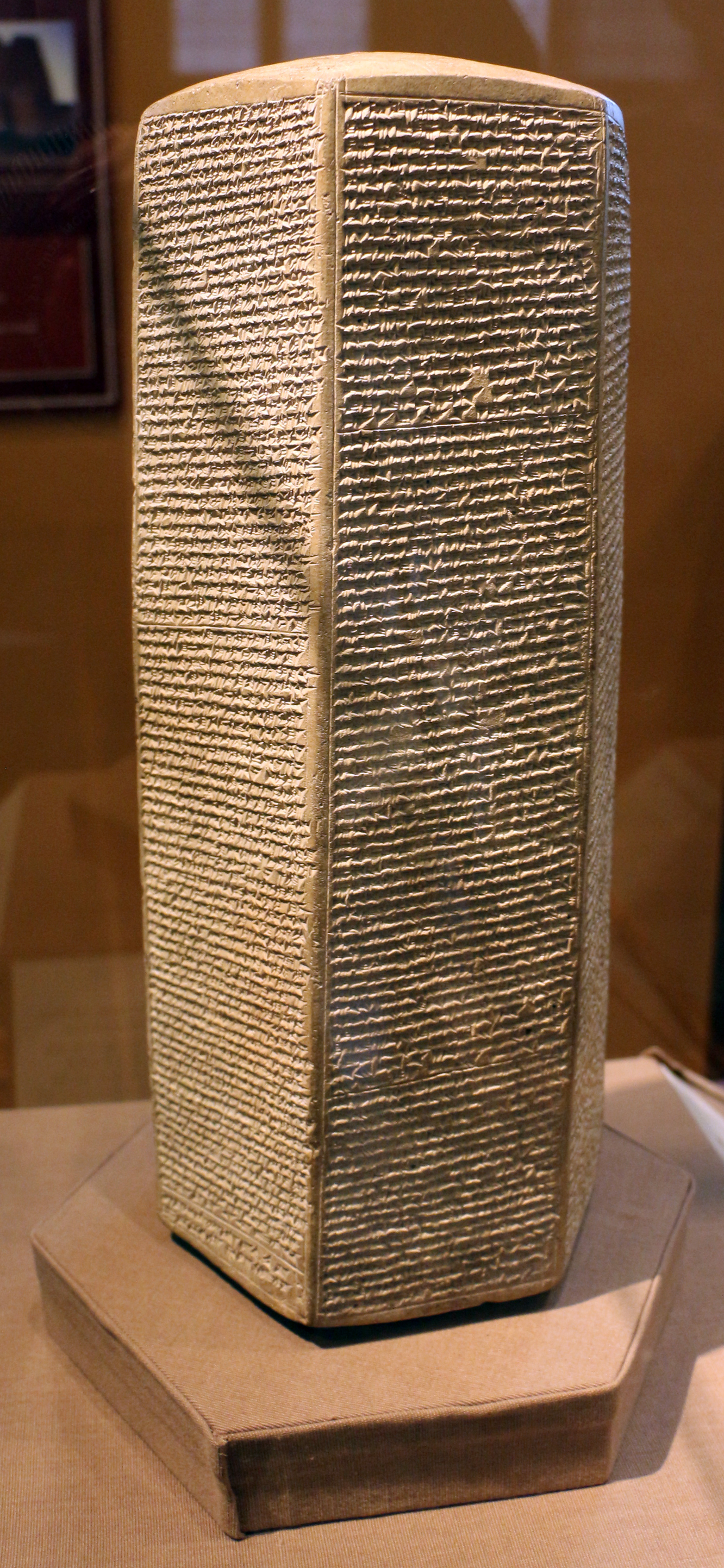
Prism of Sennacherib (705–681 BC), containing records of his military campaigns, culminating with Babylon's destruction. Exhibited at the Oriental Institute of the University of Chicago.

King Sennacherib had lost his eldest son in the revolt and had also suffered heavy losses. Past Assyrian attempts at punishing Babylon had been lenient because of a strong pro-Babylon presence in Assyrian governmental ranks. However, Sennacherib, now an old man with nothing to lose, found no pity in his heart and sacked Babylon. Large amounts of desecration took place even for Assyrian standards. The destruction was so much great that it may have been a factor in Sennacherib's murder by two of his sons eight years after the destruction. Another of his sons, Esarhaddon, succeeded him and endeavoured to compensate Babylonia for his father's sacrilege by releasing Babylonian exiles and rebuilding Babylon.
