= Tell Asmar Hoard =

Collection of Mesopotamian statues found in Iraq

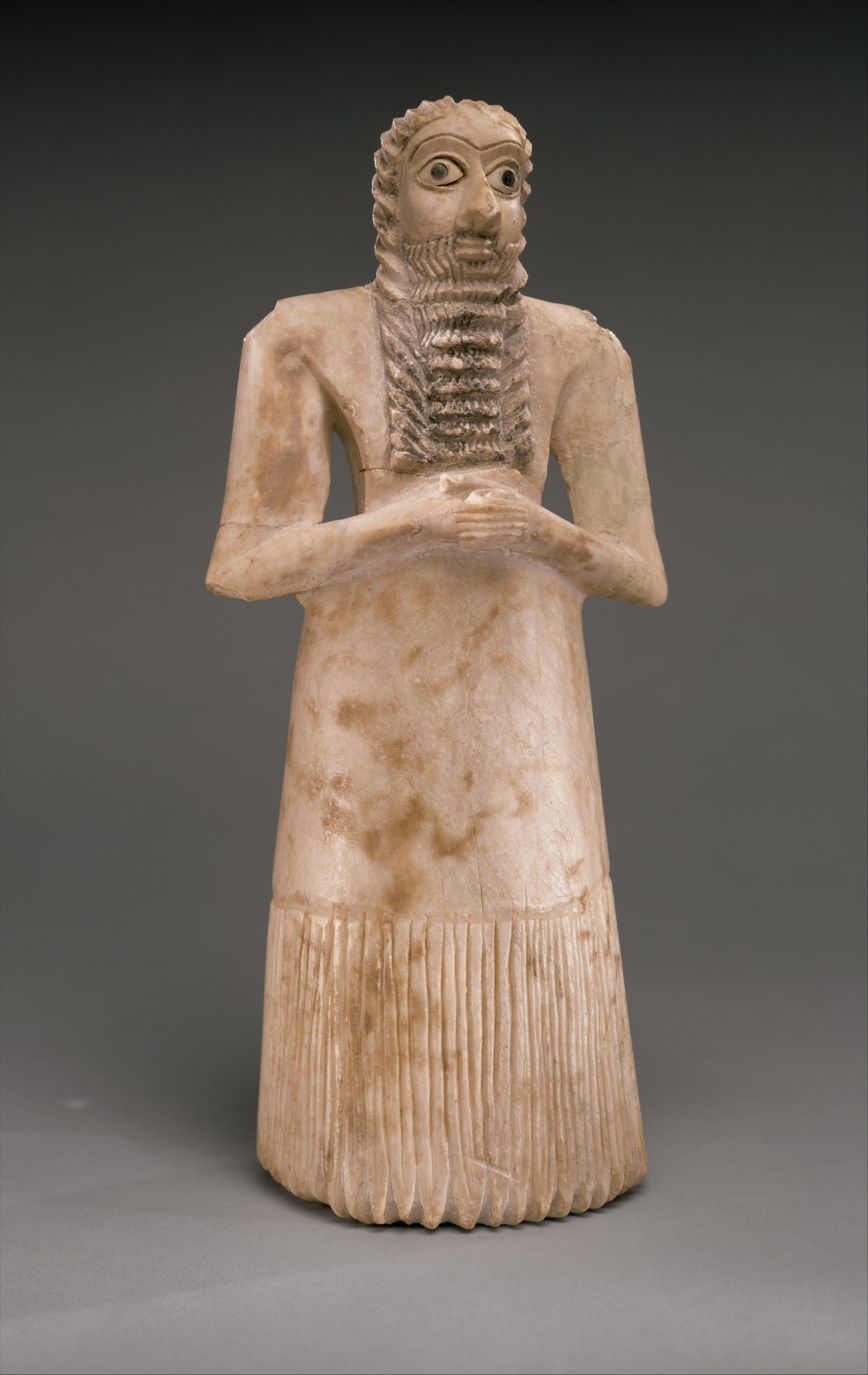
- Sumerian male worshiper, alabaster with shell eyes. One of the twelve statues in the hoard.
- Material: Gypsum, Limestone, Alabaster
- Created: Early Dynastic I-II, c. 2900–2550 BC
- Discovered: Tell Asmar, Iraq
- Present location: Metropolitan Museum, New York, National Museum of Iraq, Oriental Institute, Chicago,

Location
- Location of Tell Asmar.

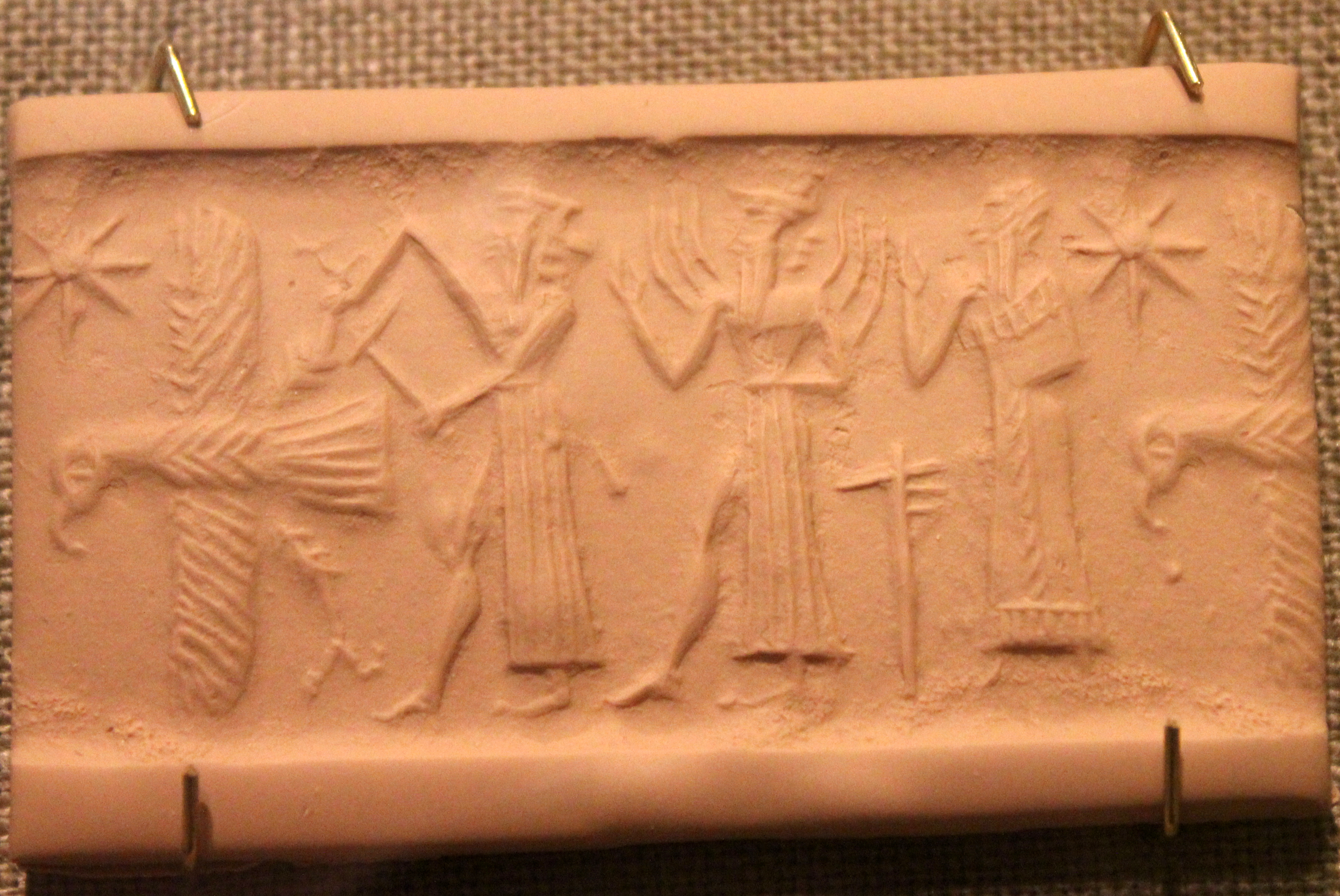
Gray limestone, Tell Asmar, Northern Palace, Akkadian (2350-2150 BC)

The Tell Asmar Hoard (Early Dynastic I-II, c. 2900–2550 BC) are a collection of twelve statues unearthed in 1933 at Eshnunna (modern Tell Asmar) in the Diyala Governorate of Iraq. Despite subsequent finds at this site and others throughout the greater Mesopotamian area, they remain the definitive example of the abstract style of Early Dynastic temple sculpture (2900 BC–2350 BC).

== Discovery ==
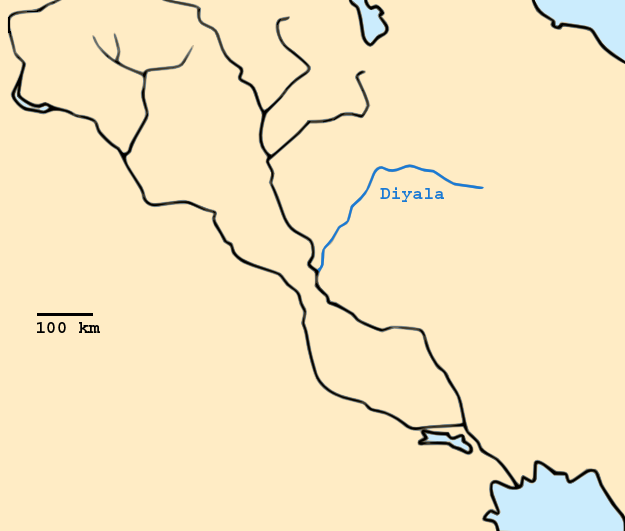
Diyala river branching out from the Tigris river(top right) and Euphrates river (left) depicted on the map of mesopotamia.

In the late 1920s antique dealers in Baghdad were acquiring large quantities of unusual, high quality artifacts from the desert east of the Diyala River, just north of its confluence with the Tigris. In 1929 the Oriental Institute at the University of Chicago obtained a concession to excavate the area. James Henry Breasted (1865–1935), the founder of the institute, invited the Dutch Archeologist Henri Frankfort (1897–1954) to lead the expedition. Between 1930 and 1937 Frankfort and his team conducted extensive horizontal and vertical excavations on four mounds: Khafajah, Tell Asmar (ancient Eshnunna), Tell Agrab, and Ishchali. They uncovered temples, palaces, administrative buildings, and houses ranging in date from about 3100 to 1750 B.C. The hundreds of artifacts recovered from the stratified ruins of these ancient civic structures greatly enhanced understanding of Early Dynastic periodization.

Among the most well-known and best preserved objects are the twelve statues known collectively as the Tell Asmar Hoard. The hoard was found during the 1933-34 excavation season at Tell Asmar beneath the floor of a temple dedicated to the god Abu. The statues were neatly stacked in an oblong(non-square rectangle) cavity beside an altar in the sanctuary. The careful placement suggests that they were buried intentionally. However, the reason for the burial and person(s) responsible for doing so remains unclear. Frankfort, who wrote extensively on the subject, suggests that a priest periodically buried old or badly damaged statues in order to make room in the temple for their replacements.

== The statues ==
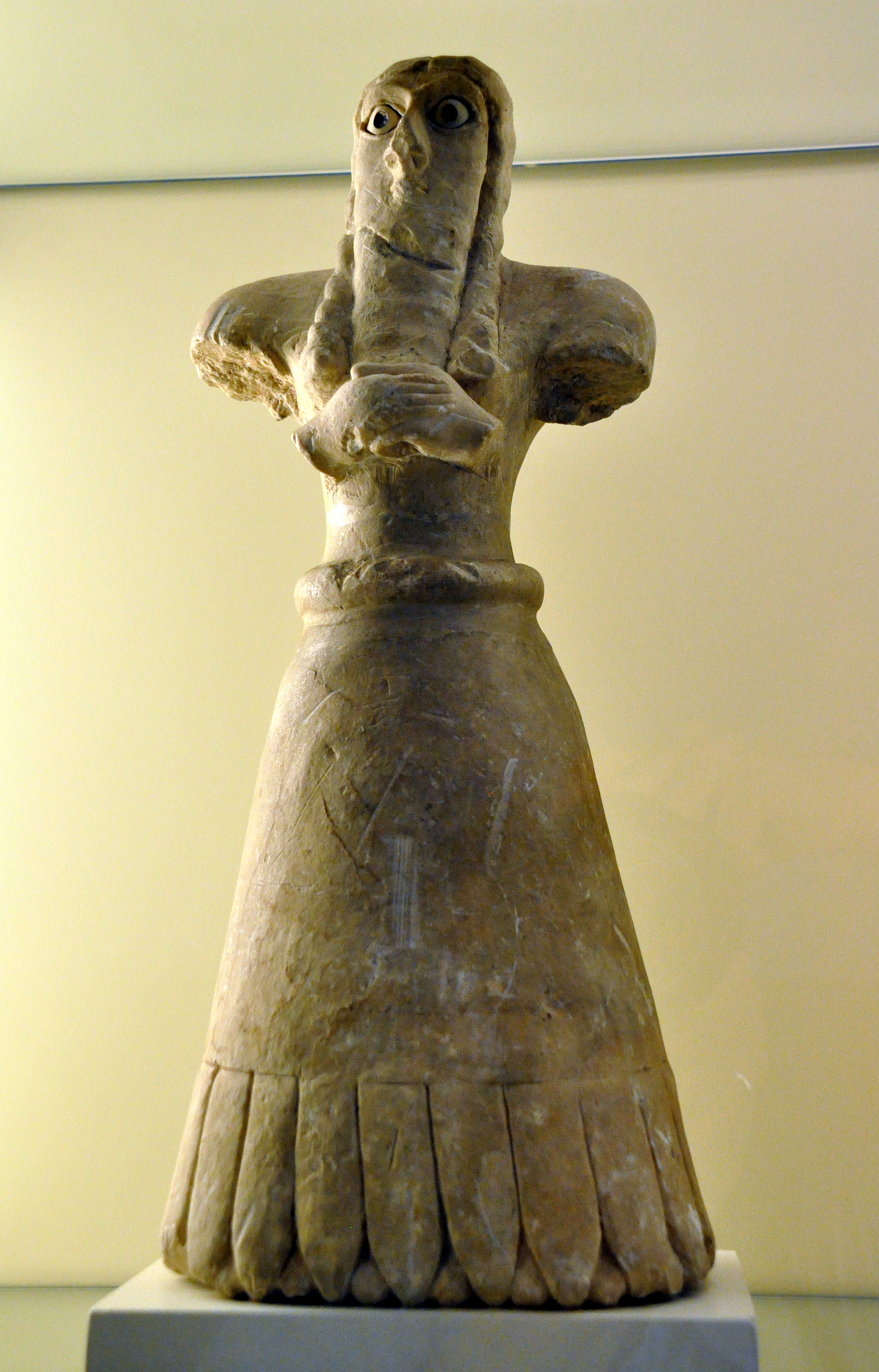
Early Dynastic statuette of a Sumerian male worshiper, very similar to Tell Asmar Hoard's statuettes, from Mesopotamia, Iraq

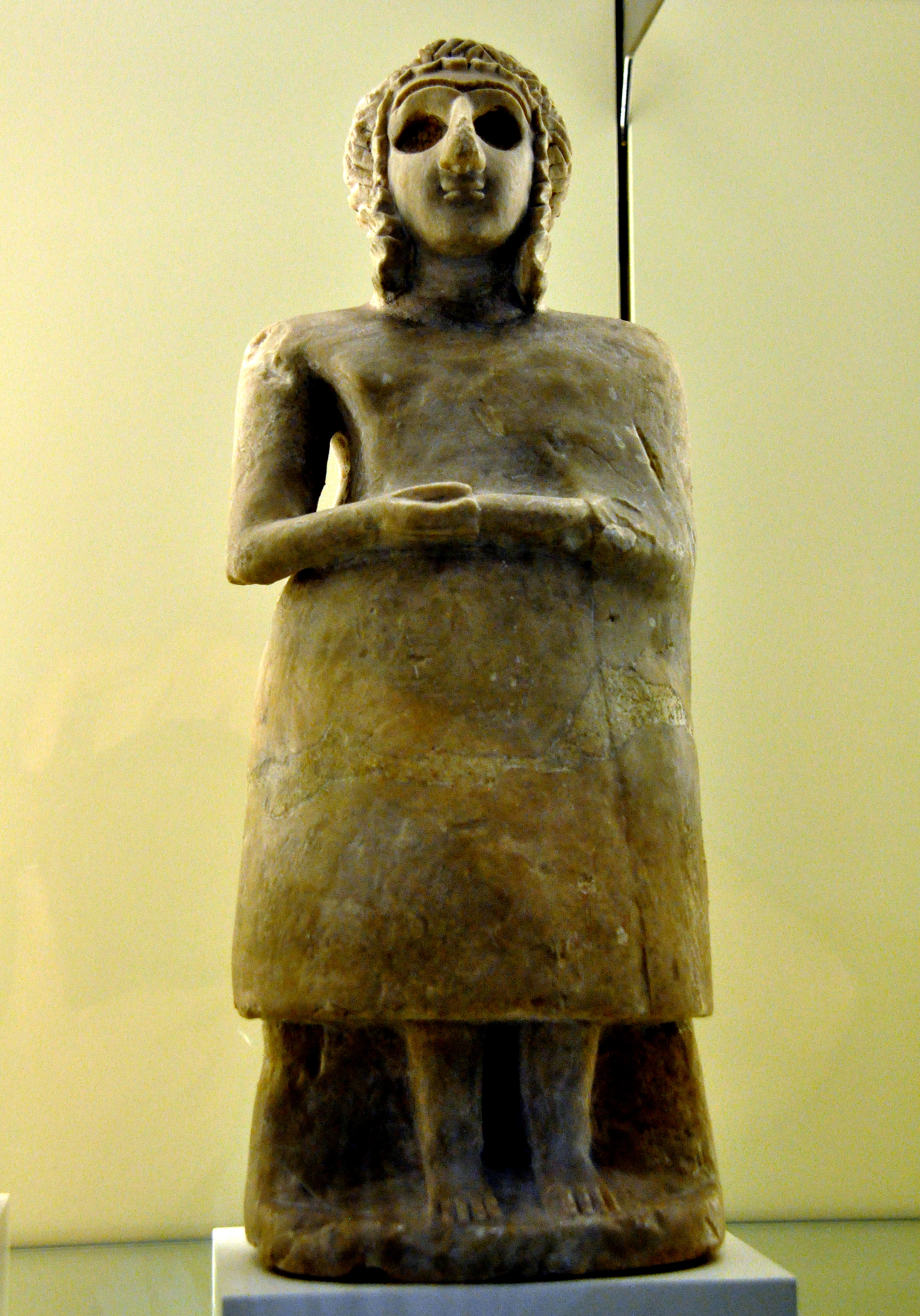
Early Dynastic statuette of a Sumerian female worshiper, very similar to Tell Asmar Hoard's statuettes, from Mesopotamia, Iraq

The statues of the Tell Asmar Hoard range in height from 21 cm (8.2 in.) to 72 cm (28.3 in.). Of the twelve statues found, ten are male and two are female. Eight of the figures are made from gypsum, two from limestone, and one (the smallest) from alabaster. All the figures, with the exception of one that is kneeling, are rendered in a standing position. Thin circular bases were used as supports and large wedge shaped feet provided the larger statues with added durability. The males wear kilts with a patterned hem that covers the midsection and thighs. Their broad shoulders and thick, circular arms frame the bare chest, which is partially covered by a black, stylized beard. All the males, with the exception of one that is bald and clean shaven, have long hair rendered in two symmetrical halves that frames the smooth surfaces of the cheeks and forehead. The large eyes, which are undoubtedly the most striking stylistic feature that the statues share in common, are made from inlays of white shell and black limestone; one figure has pupils of lapis lazuli. These materials are secured to the head with bitumen, which was also used as a pigment to give the beard and hair its characteristic black color. Both the hair and the clothing, though abstracted, accurately reflect Sumerian styles of the Early Dynastic period.

The hoard was discovered in a temple dedicated to Abu, the ancient Near Eastern god of fertility. Evidence from Early Dynastic ruins at Khafajah suggests that the statues may have been arranged along the walls of the sanctuary either on the floor or on a low mud brick bench before they were buried. Some of the statues are inscribed on the back and bottom with a name and personalized supplicatory message, while others simply state “one who offers prayers.” These inscriptions indicate that the statues functioned as a surrogate for male and female worshipers who wished to leave their prayers with the god. In the 3rd millennium B.C., the price for a votive statue likely depended on its size, and possibly what stone was used.

Jacobsen argued that the largest figure in the hoard is not an effigy of a human worshiper, but rather a representation of the patron deity Abu. He calls attention to a number of features that set this particular statue apart from the rest including: the size, the unnaturally large eyes, especially the pupils, and the emblematic carving of an eagle with outstretched wings, flanked by two recumbent mountain goats carved on the base.

== Gallery ==
Sumerian worshipper statues, part of the "Tell Asmar Hoard" at the Iraq Museum in Baghdad; 7 statues (out of 12) are on display in the Sumerian Gallery of the Iraq Museum.

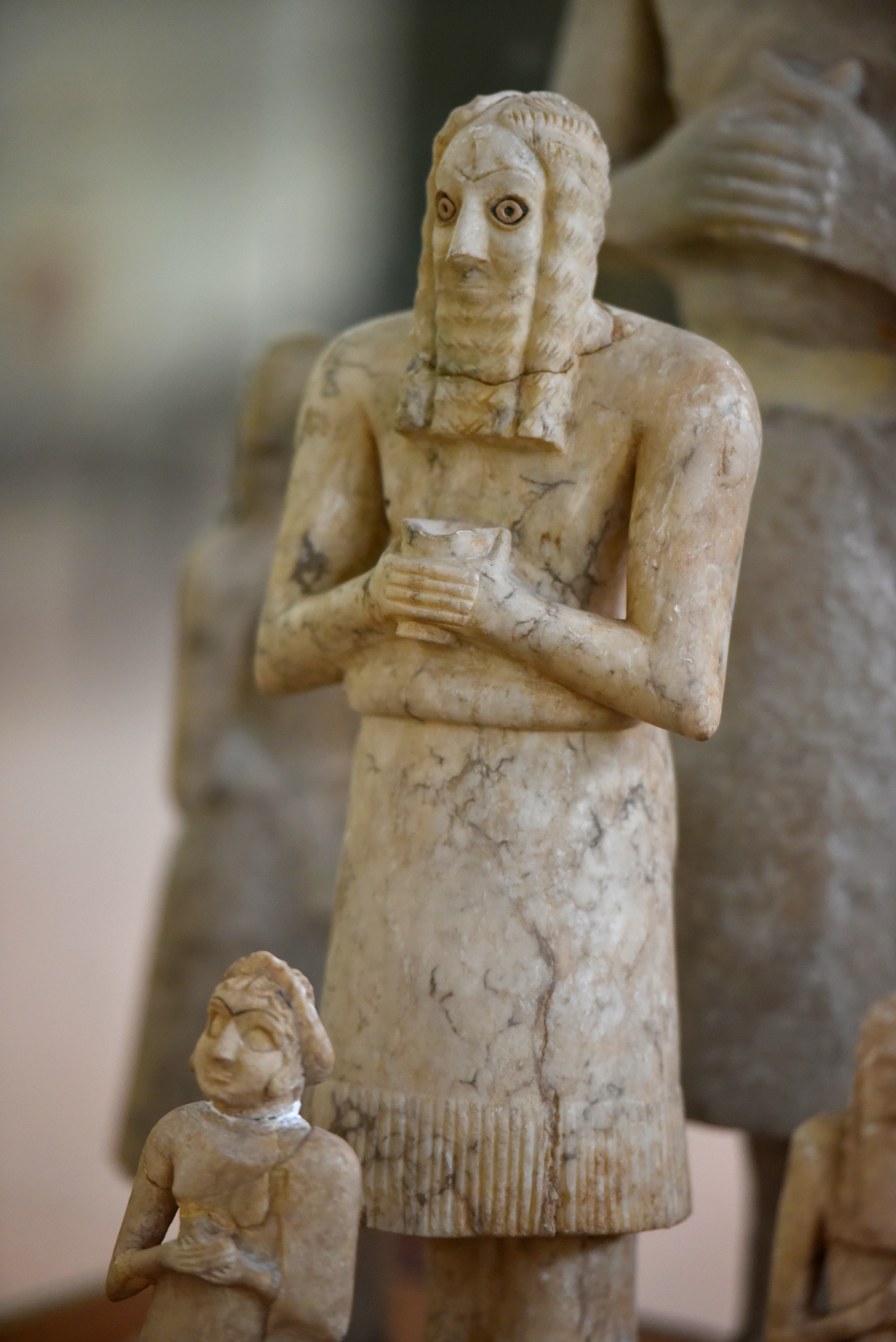
Male worshipper, Iraq Museum

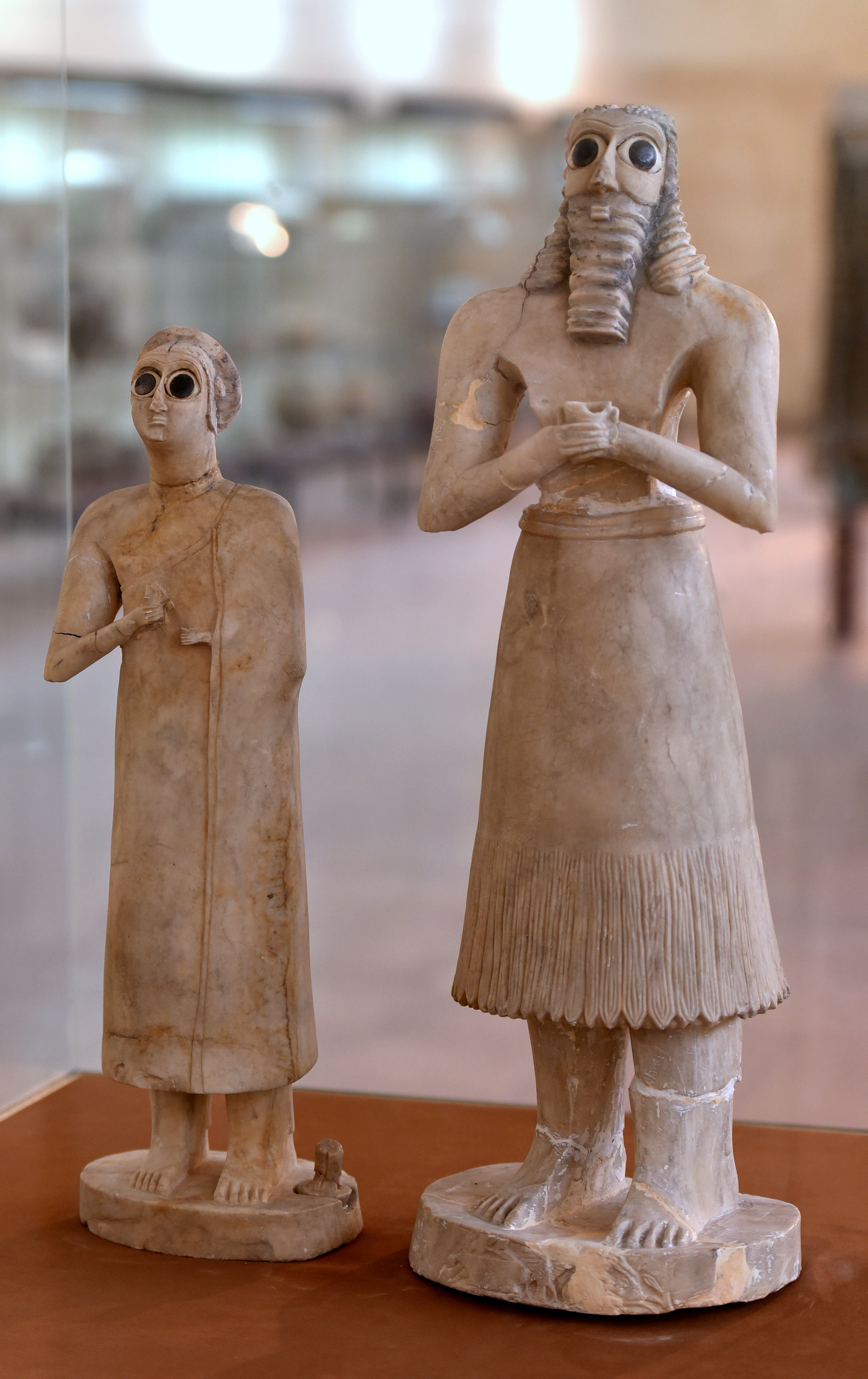
Male and female worshippers, Iraq Museum

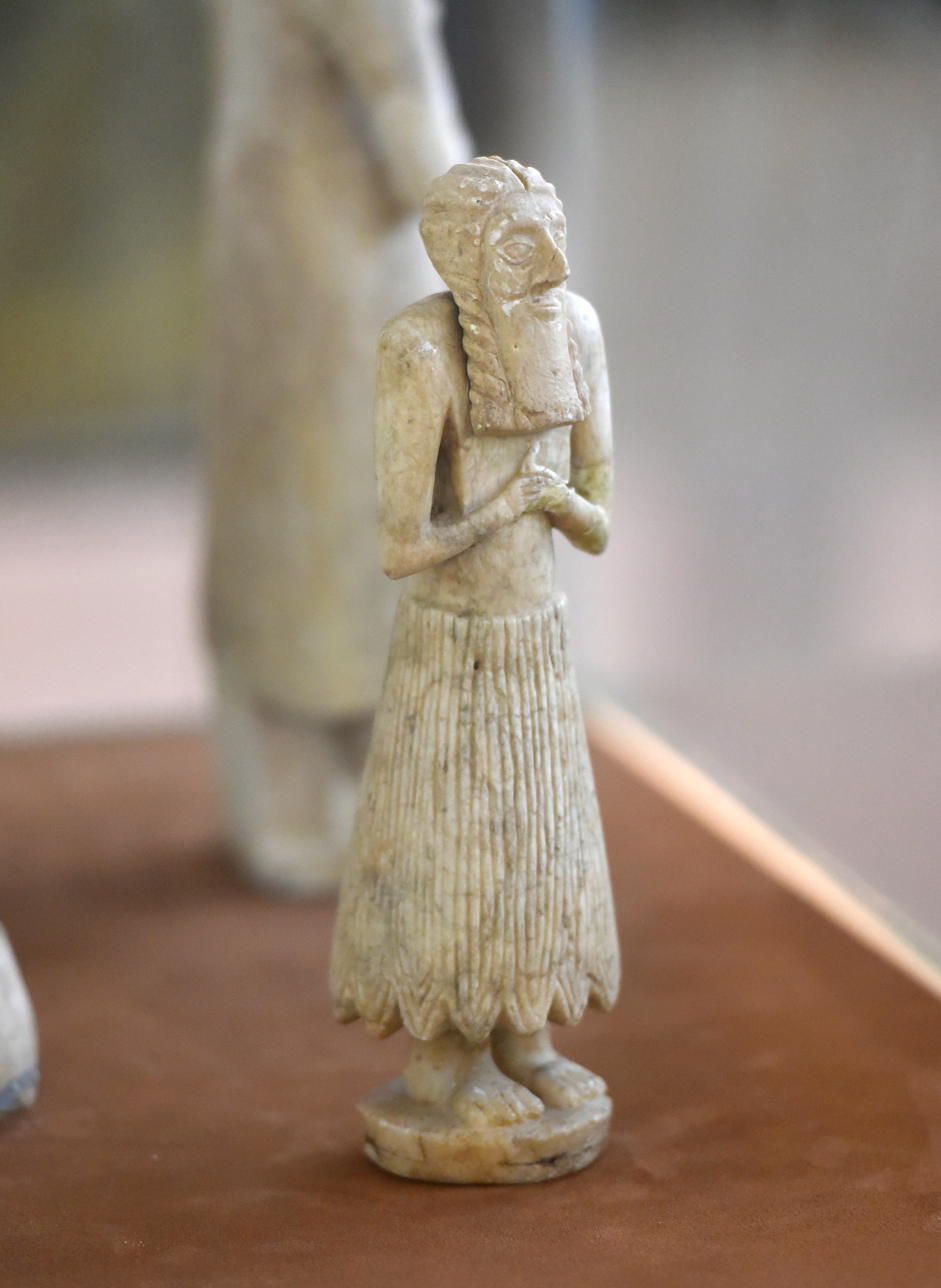
Male worshipper, Iraq Museum

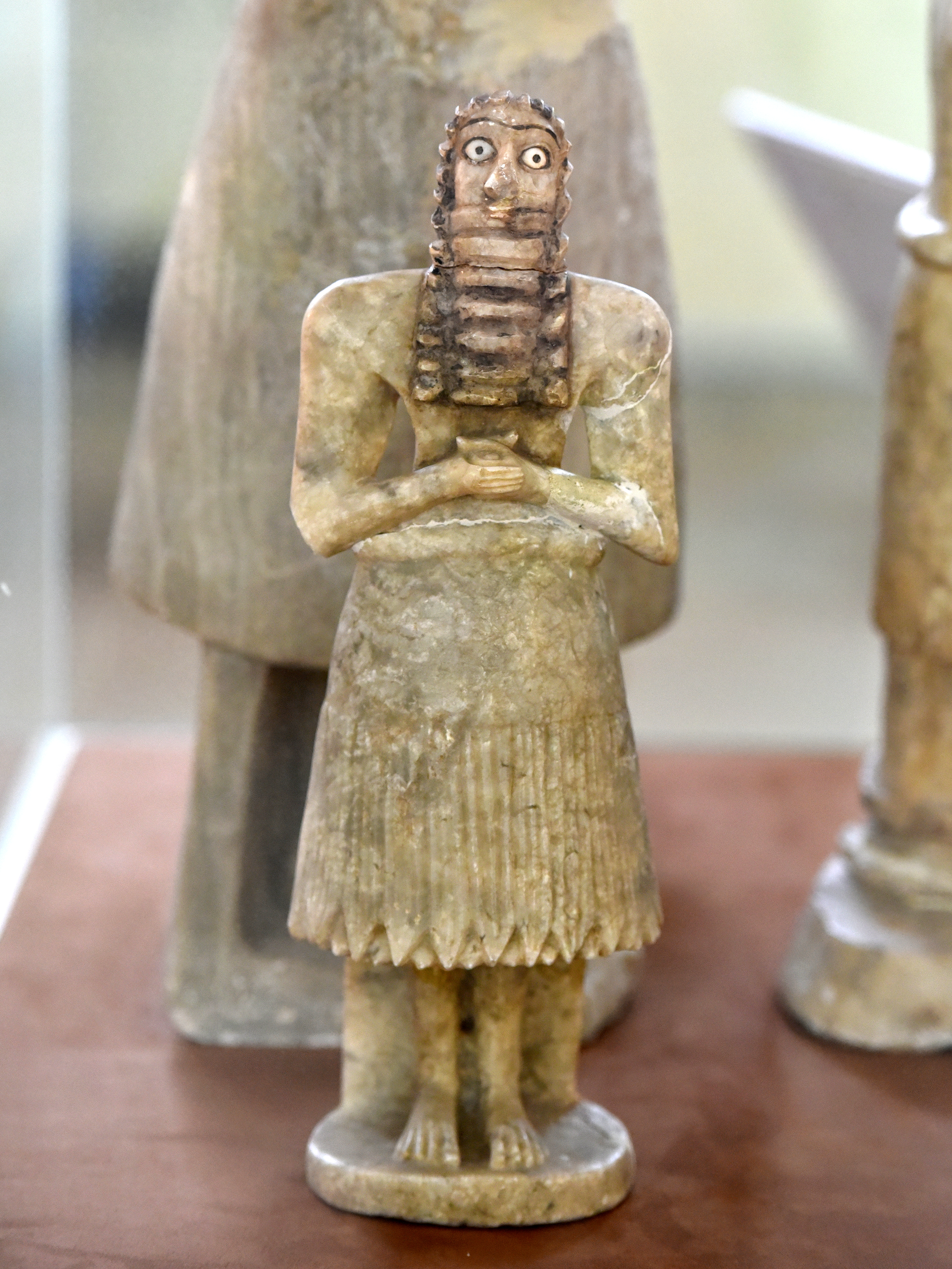
Male worshipper, Iraq Museum

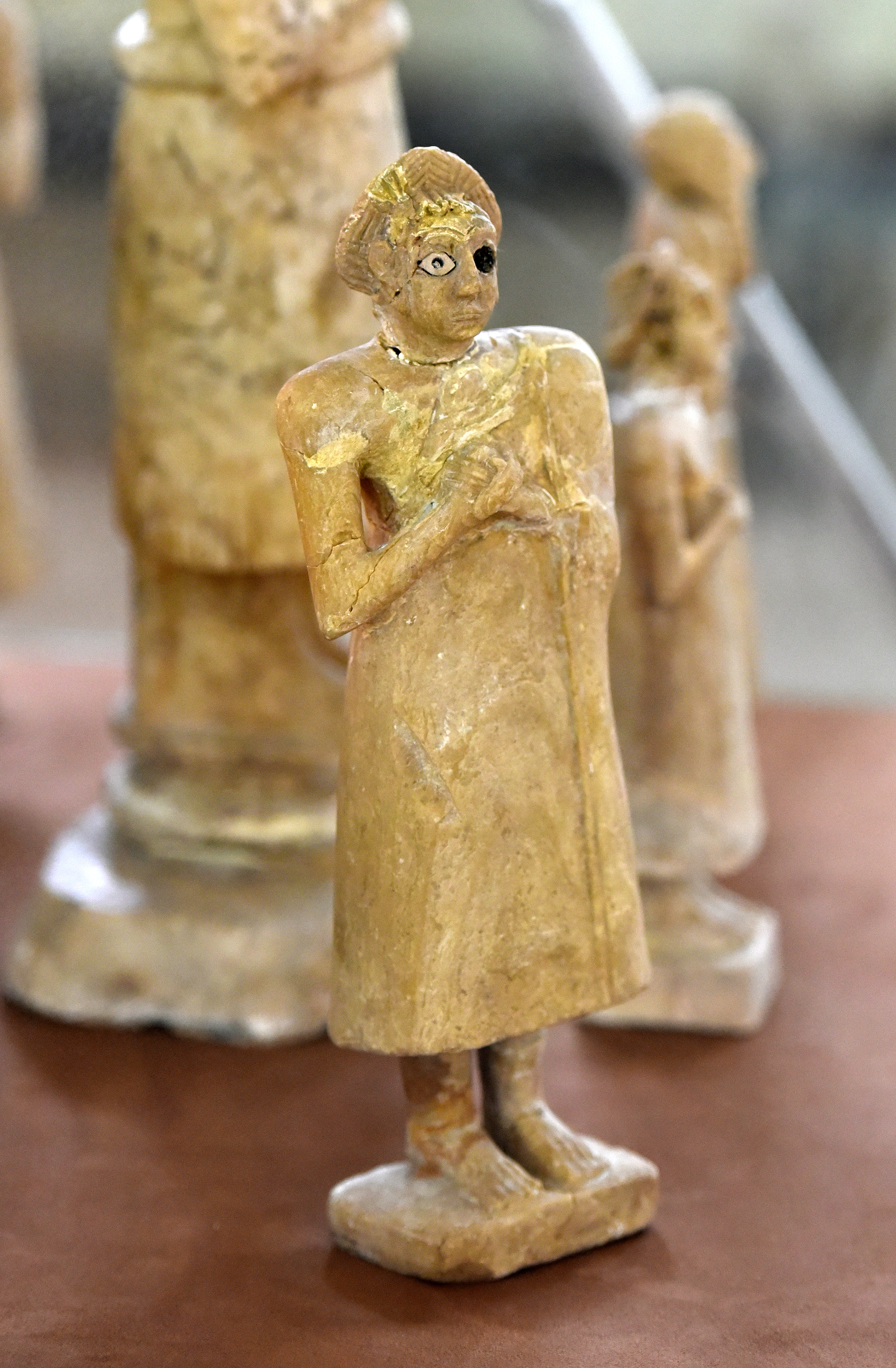
Female worshipper, Iraq Museum

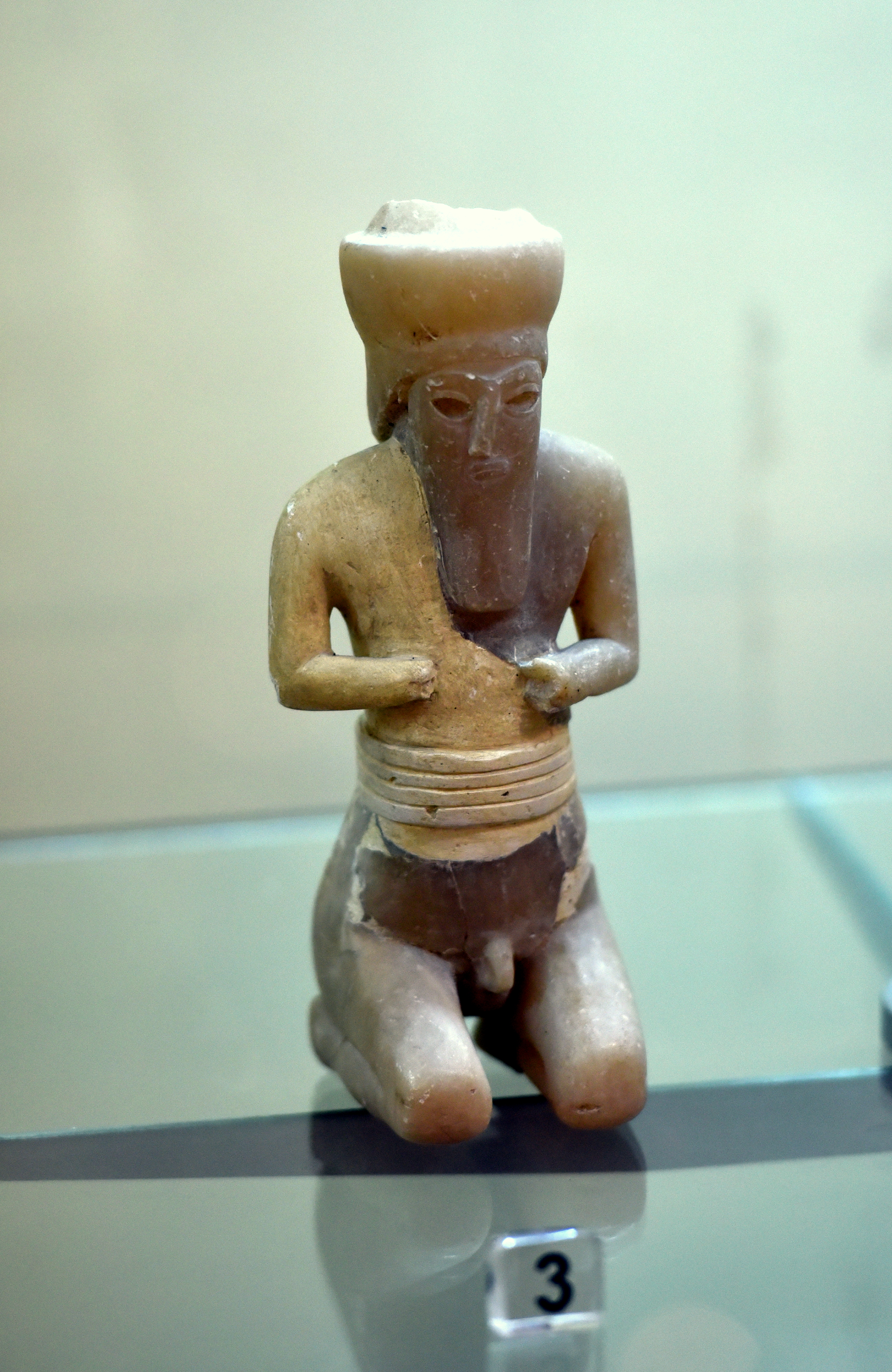
Seated worshiper, nude male, Iraq Museum

== Bibliography ==
- Evans, Jean. 2012. The Lives Of Sumerian Sculpture: An Archaeology of the Early Dynastic Temple. Chicago: University of Chicago.
- Evans, Jean. 2007. The Square Temple at Tell Asmar and the Construction of Early Dynastic Mesopotamia, ca. 2900-2350 B.C.E. American Journal of Archaeology 4: 599-632.
- Frankfort, Henri. 1939. Sculpture of the 3rd Millennium B.C. from Tell Asmar and Khafajah. The University of Chicago, Oriental Institute Publications 60. Chicago.
- 1943. More Sculpture from the Diyala Region. The University of Chicago, Oriental Institute Publications 60. Chicago.
- Jacobsen, Thorkild, "God or Worshipper", in Essays in Ancient Civilization Presented to Helene J. Kantor, edited by A. Leonard Jr. and B.B. Williams, p 125-30. Chicago. 1989.
