= Beduhe Dam =

Dam in Dohuk, Iraq

- Location within Iraq
- Official name: Beduhe Dam
- Country: Iraq
- Location: Beduhe, Barwari, Dohuk Province
- Coordinates: 37°15′48.46″N 43°23′33.05″E
- Status: Under construction
- Construction began: 2010
- Owners: KRG, Ministry of Agriculture and Water Resources

Dam and spillways
- Type of dam: Embankment, concrete-face rock-fill
- Height: 35.5 m (116 ft)
- Height (foundation): 46.5
- Height (thalweg): 36.5
- Length: 240 m (787 ft)
- Width (crest): 10
- Spillway type: Stepped Spillway
- Spillway capacity: 171.86

Reservoir
- Total capacity: 3,110,000 m^{3} (2,521 acre⋅ft)
- Maximum length: 2000 m
- Maximum width: 400

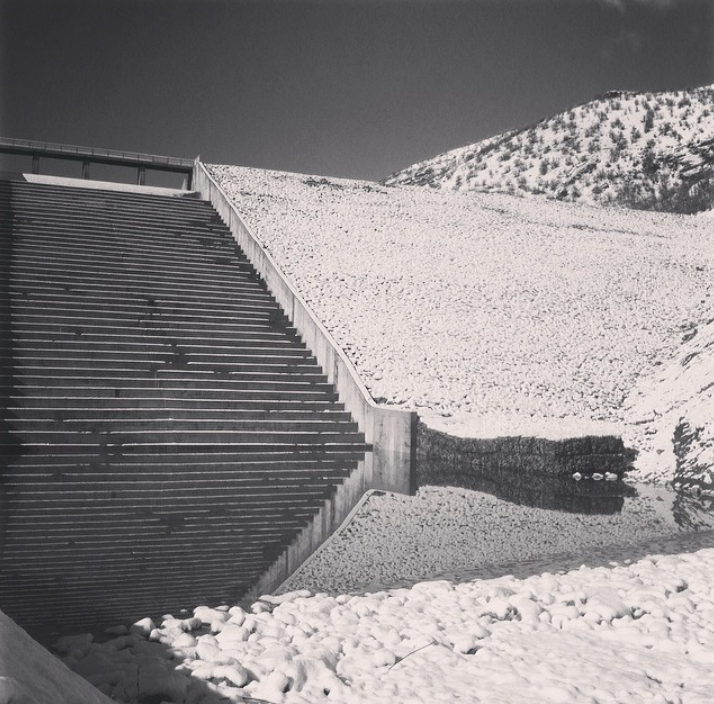
B&W image of the Beduhe Dam in Winter

The Beduhe Dam is a concrete-face rock-fill dam currently under construction near Kani Mase in Dohuk Province, Iraq. The foundation stone for the dam was laid on 18 February 2010.
