= Adhaim Dam =

Dam in Salah ad Din, Iraq

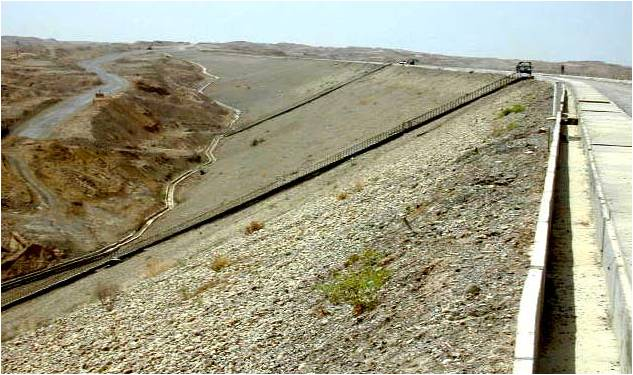
- Downstream face of the dam

- Location within Iraq
- Country: Iraq
- Location: 100km northeast of Baghdad, Iraq, Salah ad Din Governorate, Iraq
- Coordinates: 34°33′54″N 44°30′56″E
- Status: Operational
- Opening date: 2000
- Owner: Ministry of Water Resources

Dam and spillways
- Type of dam: Embankment, zoned earth-fill
- Impounds: Al Uzaym (Adhaim) River
- Height: 76.5 m (251 ft)
- Length: 3,500 m (11,483 ft)
- Elevation at crest: 146.5 m (481 ft)
- Width (crest): 12 m (39 ft)
- Spillway capacity: 1,150 m^{3}/s (40,612 cu ft/s)

Reservoir
- Normal elevation: 131.5 m (431 ft)

Power Station
- Installed capacity: 27 MW (planned)

Adhaim Dam is a multi-purpose embankment dam on the Al Uzaym (Adhaim) River 133 km northeast of Baghdad, Iraq. The purpose of the dam is flood control, hydro-power and irrigation. The dam was completed in 2000 with only the embankment, spillway and intake. The power station and irrigation outlets are unfinished. When complete, the power station will have a 27 MW installed capacity and the irrigation outlets will be able to discharge 73 m^{3}/s (2,578 cu ft/s).

== See also ==
- List of dams and reservoirs in Iraq
