= Duhok Dam =

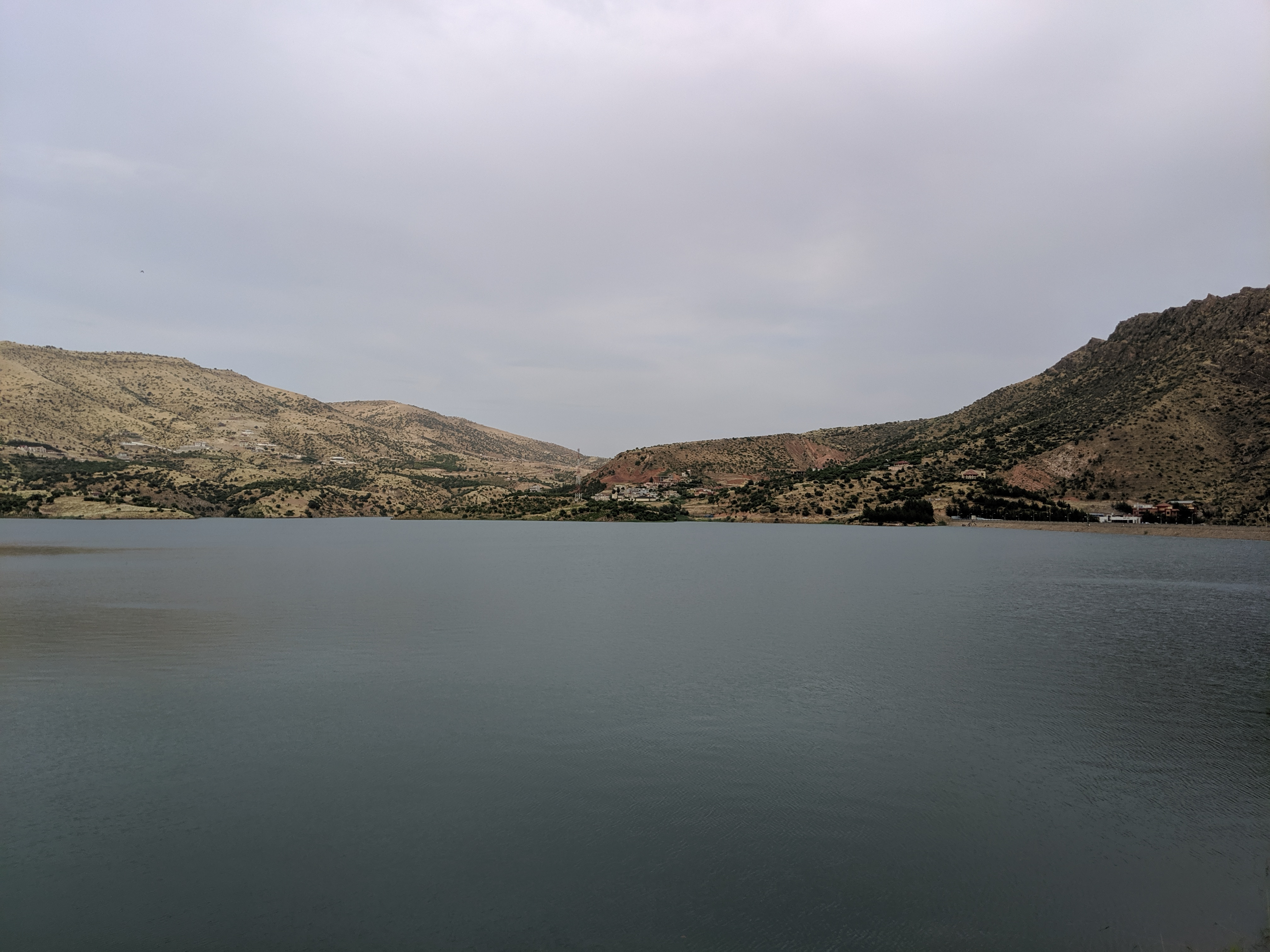
- Duhok Dam

- Location within Iraq
- Official name: بەنداڤا دهۆکێ
- Country: Iraq
- Location: Duhok, Kurdistan region of Iraq
- Coordinates: 36°52′33″N 43°00′13″E
- Status: Operational
- Construction began: 1980
- Opening date: 1988

Dam and spillways
- Type of dam: Embankment, earth-fill
- Impounds: Duhok River
- Height: 60 m (197 ft)
- Length: 600 m (1,969 ft)
- Spillway type: Bell-mouth
- Spillway capacity: 81 m^{3}/s (2,860 cu ft/s)

Reservoir
- Total capacity: 52,000,000 m^{3} (42,157 acre⋅ft)
- Maximum length: 4 km (2 mi)
- Maximum width: 1.7 km (1 mi)

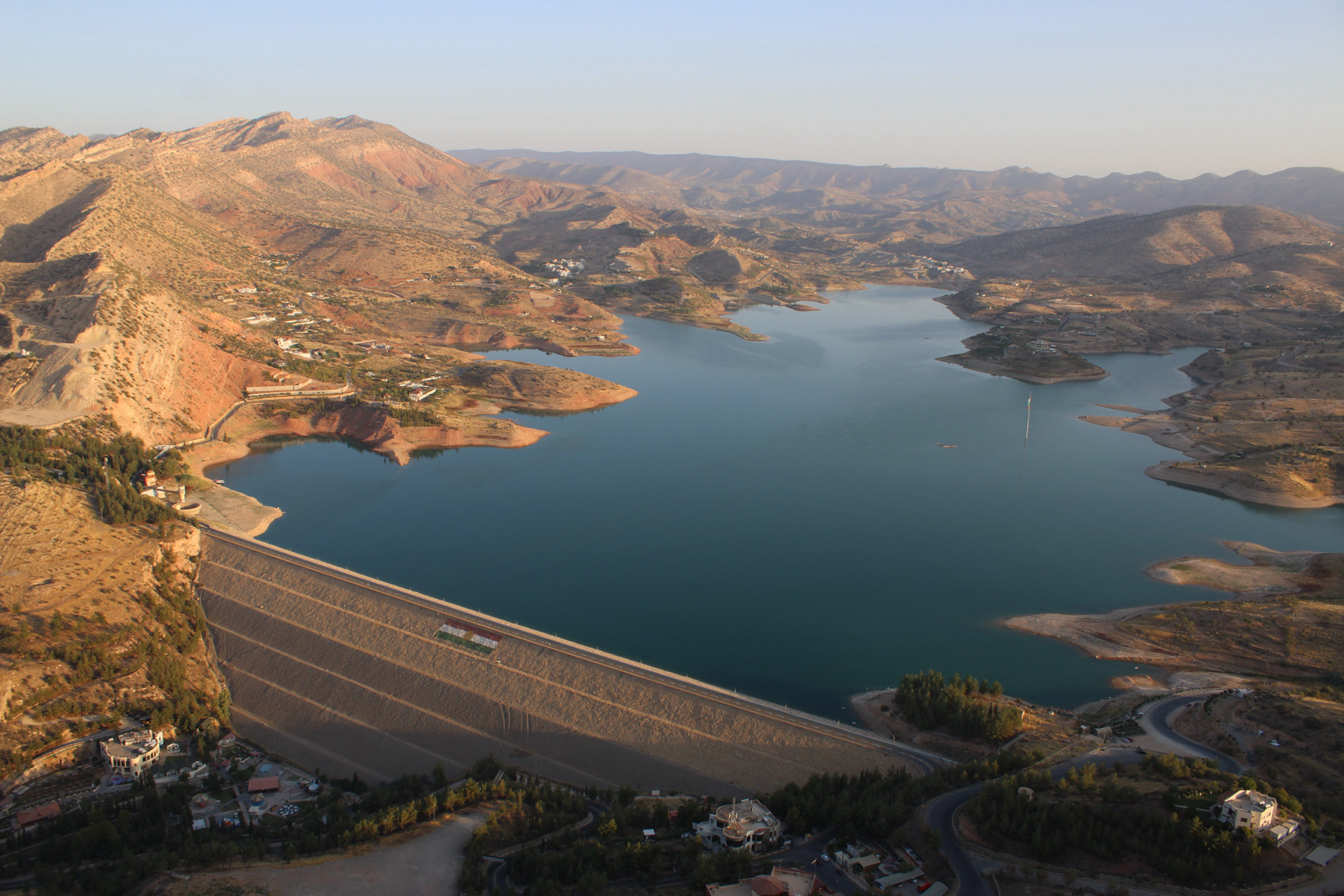
Duhok Dam at sunrise in 2025.

The Duhok Dam is an earth-fill embankment dam on the Duhok River just north of city of Duhok in Duhok Governorate, Kurdistan region of Iraq. The dam was completed in 1988 with the primary purpose of providing water for irrigation. It is 60 m (197 ft) tall and can withhold 52,000,000 m^{3} (42,157 acre⋅ft) of water. The dam has a bell-mouth spillway with a maximum discharge of 81 m^{3}/s (2,860 cu ft/s).

Watersport on Duhok Dam has increased in popularity over the recent years, an increase in Jetski use in local lakes & dams has brought more tourism to the area, providing an increase of income for locals in the surrounding villages and city.

== See also ==
- List of dams and reservoirs in Iraq
