= Diyala Weir =

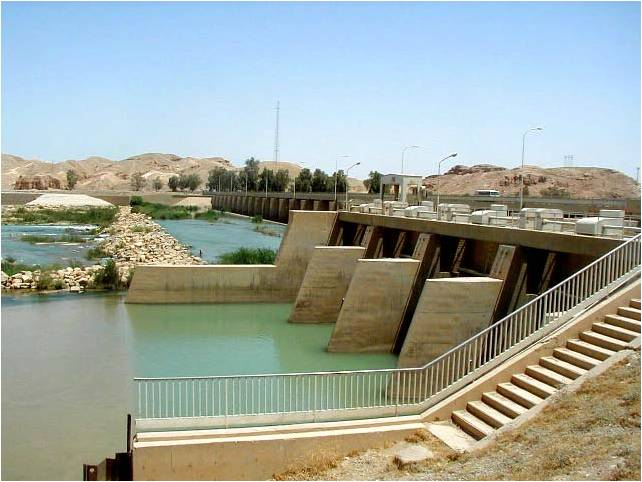

- Location within Iraq
- Location: 90km northeast of Baghdad, Iraq, Diyala Governorate, Iraq
- Coordinates: 34°03′52″N 44°58′53″E
- Construction began: 1966
- Opening date: 1969
- Operator: Ministry of Water Resources

Dam and spillways
- Impounds: Diyala River

Diyala Weir, also known as the Diyala Barrage, is a diversion dam on the Diyala River 90 km northeast of Baghdad, Iraq. It was constructed between 1966 and 1969. The main purpose of the dam is to divert outflow of the Hemrin Dam (11 km upstream) on the Diyala River to the Khalis and Sadr Al-Mushtarak canals for irrigation.

The weir and its associated extensive irrigation scheme, were designed in the 1960s by the Consulting Engineers Sir Murdoch McDonald and Partners, of High Holborn, London. At each end it incorporates irrigation canals. These and the weir are crossed by road bridges designed to take the heaviest loads, namely a tank on a wheeled transporter. The bridge works were designed by the then Captain B P Daly of Royal Engineers, who was attached to the Consultants. The weir was featured on a set of three Iraqi postage stamps.

== See also ==
- List of dams and reservoirs in Iraq
