= Battle of Diyala River =

693 BC battle

Date	693 BC
Location	Nippur and Diyala River
Result	Assyrian victory

Belligerents
Elamites; Babylonia; Ellipi	Assyria

Commanders and leaders
Mushezib-Marduk	Sennacherib

The Battle of Diyala River took place in 693 BC between the forces of the Neo-Assyrian Empire and the Elamites of southern Iran.

== Assyrian expansion ==
From the 9th century BC onwards, the Assyrians had been expanding their domain from northern Mesopotamia into Judea and Babylon. After defeating the Babylonians in 689 BC, King Sennacherib sought to punish the Kingdom of Elam for its support towards Babylonia.

== Battle ==
Prior to the battle, Sennacherib had sacked a number of Elamite settlements in 694 BC in an attempt to assert his authority over the region. Despite this, the Elamites, with their Chaldean allies from Babylon, managed to raise an army and met the Assyrian forces of Sennacherib in 693 BC at the Diyala River. According to the Assyrian account of the battle, the Elamites were heavily defeated. However, many historians believe that the Assyrians suffered heavy casualties since they failed to launch any invasions in 692 BC. In 647 BC, the Assyrians returned and this time destroyed the Kingdom of Elam.

== References and further reading ==
- Battle: A Visual Journey Through 5,000 Years of Combat, by R.G. Grant. (ISBN 9780756613600)
