= Darian, Kermanshah =

Darian داريان
- Village
- Location within Iran
- Coordinates: 35°08′23″N 46°19′05″E
- Country: Iran
- Province: Kermanshah
- County: Paveh
- Bakhsh: Central
- Rural District: Howli

Population (2006)
  - Total: 869
- Time zone: UTC+3:30 (IRST)
  - Summer (DST): UTC+4:30 (IRDT)

Darian (Persian: داريان, also Romanized as Dārīān, Dāryān, and Dāreyān; also known as Dar Air) is a village in Howli Rural District, in the Central District of Paveh County, Kermanshah Province, Iran. At the 2006 census, its population was 869, in 247 families. The Daryan Dam is being constructed on the Sirvan River to the north of the village.
