= Diyala River =

River in Iran and Iraq

Coordinates: 33.2208°N 44.5064°E

Diyala river
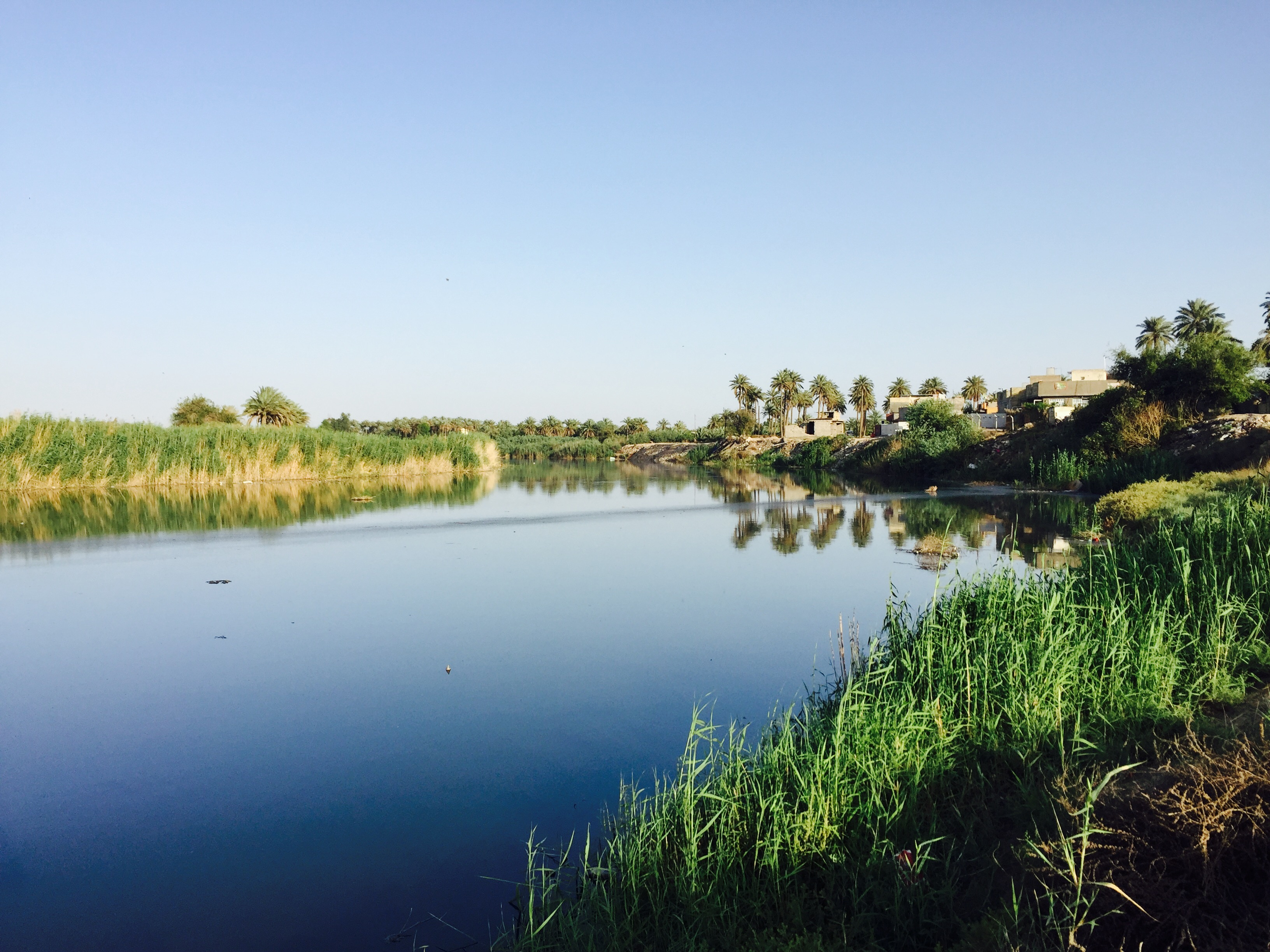

Location
- Country: Iran, Iraq

Physical characteristics
- Source
  - location: North of Iraq/Western Iran
- Mouth
  - location: Tigris River
- Length: 445 km (277 mi)
- Basin size: 32,600 km^{2} (12,600 sq mi)
- Discharge
  - average: 164 m^{3}/s (5,800 cu ft/s)

Basin features
- Tributaries
  - left: Sirwan
  - right: Tanjero

The Diyala (Arabic: نهر ديالى, romanized: Nahr Diyālā; Kurdish: سیروان, romanized: Sîrwan; Persian: دیاله / سیروان, romanized: Diyâleh / Sīrvān) is a river and tributary of the Tigris. It is formed by the confluence of the Sirwan and Tanjaro rivers in Darbandikhan Dam in the Sulaymaniyah Governorate of Northern Iraq. It covers a total distance of 445 km (277 mi).

== Course ==
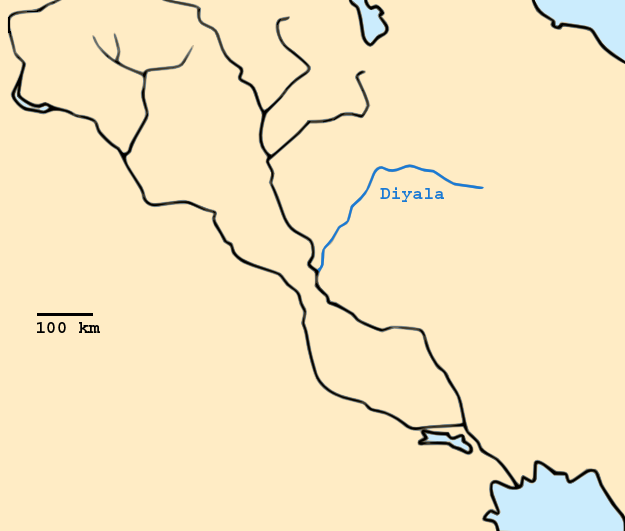
Diyala river

It rises near Hamadan, in the Zagros Mountains of Iran. It then descends through the mountains, where for some 32 km it forms the border between the two countries. It finally flows into the Tigris below Baghdad. Navigation of the upper reaches of the Diyala is not possible because of its narrow defiles, but the river's valley provides an important trade route between Iran and Iraq.

The river flows southwest of the Hamrin Mountains.

== Name ==
Its Aramaic origin is "Diyala river" and in Kurdish it is called "Sirwan", meaning 'roaring sea' or 'shouting river'. In the early Islamic period, the lower course of the river formed part of the Nahrawan Canal. The Diyala Governorate in Iraq is named after the river.

It may be the ancient Tornas river.

== History ==
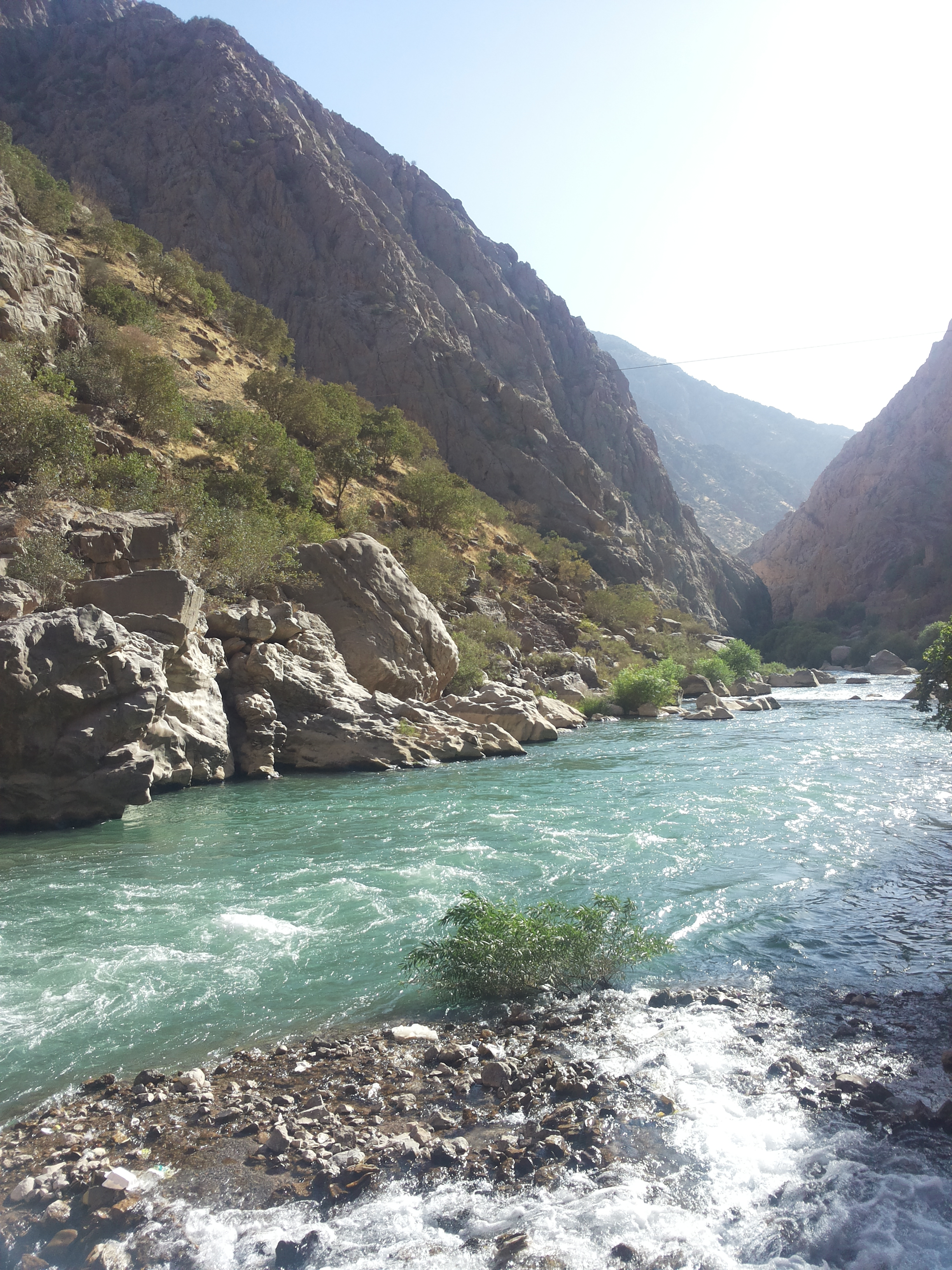
Junction of the Bil And Sirwan rivers

=== Early Bronze Age ===
This area flourished already during the Jemdet Nasr and Early Dynastic periods, through to the Akkadian period.

In Eshnunna (Tell Asmar), the Tell Asmar Hoard is particularly notable. Twelve remarkable statues were found belonging to the Early Dynastic period (2900–2350 BC).

==== Scarlet Ware ====
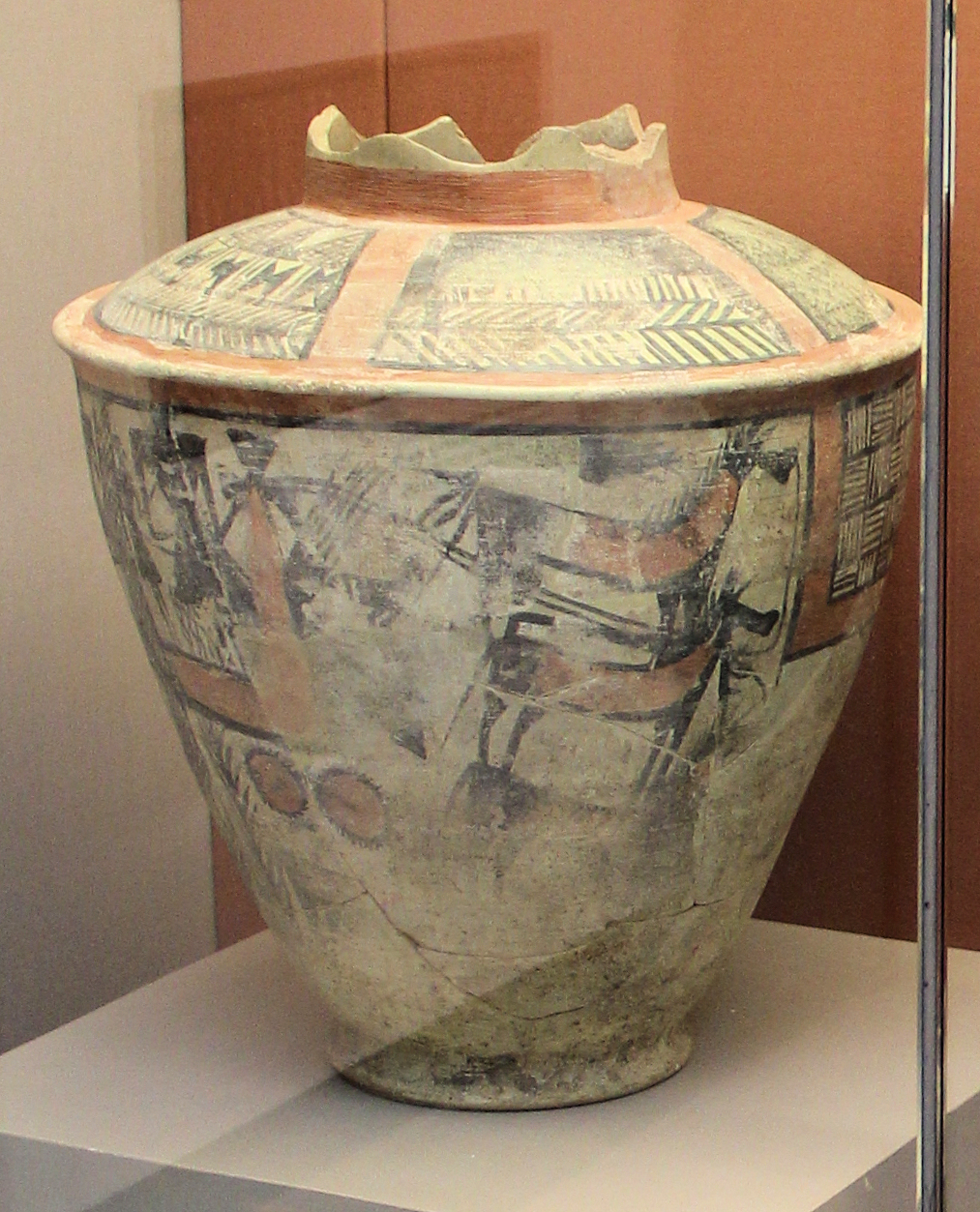
Scarlet Ware Pottery excavated in Khafajah; 2800–2600 BCE, Early Dynastic II–III, Sumer; British Museum

A type of pottery known as 'Scarlet Ware', a brightly coloured pottery with pictorial representations, was typical of sites along the Diyala River. It developed around 2800 BC, and is related to the Jemdet Nasr ware in central Mesopotamia of the same period. The red colour was achieved predominantly by using haematite paint.

Scarlet Ware is typical of Early Dynastic I and II periods. Along the Diyala is located one of the most important trade routes linking south Mesopotamia with the Iranian plateau. Thus, Scarlet ware was also popular in Pusht-i Kuh, Luristan, and it was traded to Susa during Susa II period.

=== Middle Bronze Age ===
During the Larsa period, Eshnunna especially became prominent. The Diyala river also bore the name "Shu-durul" at the time.

=== Iron Age ===
In 693 BC, the Battle of Diyala River took place between the forces of the Assyrians and the Elamites of southern Iran.

The river is mentioned in Herodotus's Histories under the name Gyndes, where it is stated that the king Cyrus the Great dispersed it by digging 360 channels as punishment after a sacred white horse perished there. The river returned to its former proportions after the channels disappeared under the sand.. Reference to this story is a crucial archetypal image used by George Eliot in Middlemarch to describe the spirit of the book's central character, Dorothea Brooke.

=== Modern history ===
In March 1917, the British Empire defeated the Ottoman Empire at the confluence with the Tigris, leading to the Fall of Baghdad, part of the Mesopotamian campaign of World War I.

== Excavations ==
Major excavations were done in the lower Diyala river basin in the 1930s. They were conducted by the University of Chicago Oriental Institute (1930–1937) and by the University of Pennsylvania (1938–1939). The sites such as Tell Agrab, Tell Asmar (ancient Eshnunna), Ishchali (ancient Neribtum), and Khafaje (ancient Tutub) were excavated.

At that time, the Diyala was relatively unexplored compared to southern and northern Mesopotamia. But looting of sites was already underway. As the result, the professional excavations were launched.

Archaeologists James Breasted and Henri Frankfort were leading these projects.

These excavations provided very comprehensive data on Mesopotamian archaeology and chronology. They covered the time between the late Uruk period and the end of the Old Babylonian period (3000–1700 BC).

Subsequently, nine detailed monographs were published, but most of the objects, numbering 12,000, remained unpublished. Launched in 1992, the Diyala Database Project has been publishing a lot of this material.

Other scholars who worked there were Thorkild Jacobsen as epigrapher, Seton Lloyd, and Pinhas Delougaz.

Around 1980, the Diyala region was also explored intensively as part of the Hamrin Dam Salvage Project. The following sites were excavated from 1977 to 1981: Tell Yelkhi, Tell Hassan, Tell Abu Husaini, Tell Kesaran, Tell Harbud, Tell al-Sarah, and Tell Mahmud.

== Dams ==
In Iran the Daryan Dam is constructed near Daryan in Kermanshah province. One of the goals of the dam is to divert a portion of the water to southwestern Iran for irrigation through the 48 km (30 mi) long Nosoud Water Conveyance Tunnel and to produce hydroelectric power. In Iraq, the river first reaches the Darbandikhan Dam which generates hydroelectric power and stores water for irrigation. It then flows down to the Hemrin Dam for similar purposes. In the lower Diyala Valley near Baghdad the river is controlled by the Diyala Weir which controls floods and irrigates the area northeast of Baghdad.

- Darbandikhan Dam, Iraq – water storage capacity: 3,000 MCM
- Bawanur Dam (under construction), Iraq – water storage capacity: 31 MCM
- Hemrin Dam, Iraq – water storage capacity: 2,040 MCM
- Diyala Weir, Iraq – water diversion dam
- Garan Dam, Iran – water storage capacity: 110 MCM
- Daryan Dam, Iran – water storage capacity: 316 MCM
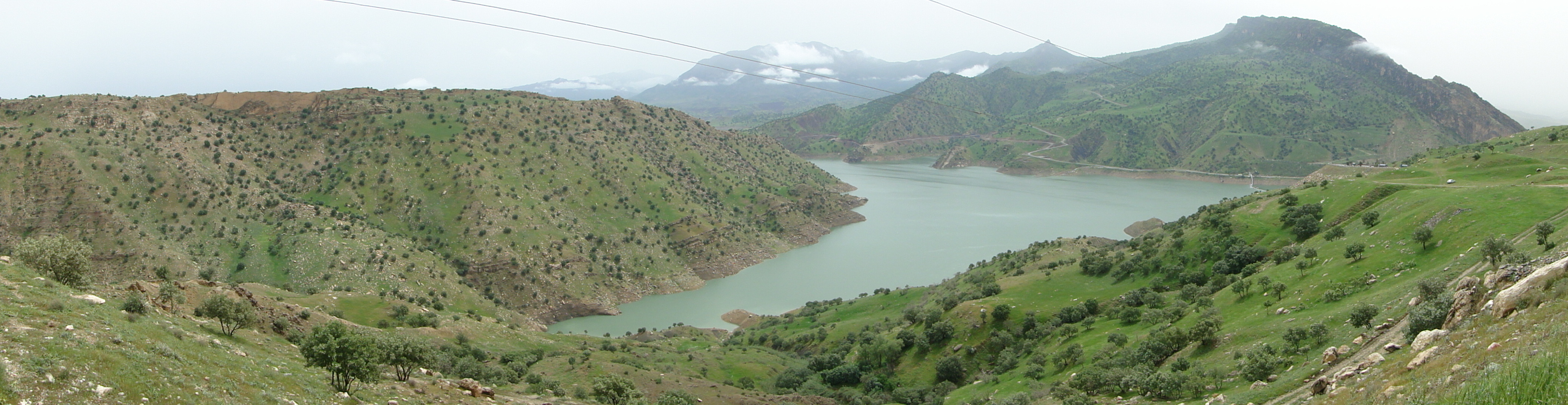
Lake Darbandikhan

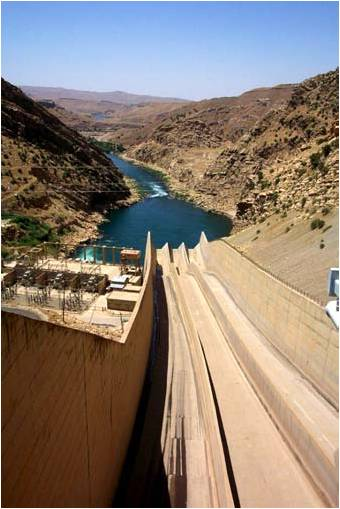
Darbandikhan Dam

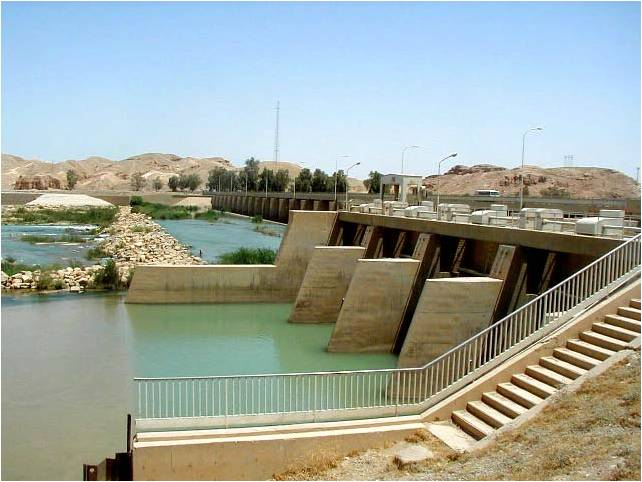
Diyala Weir

== See also ==
- List of places in Iraq
