= ʿAdhaim =

River in Iraq

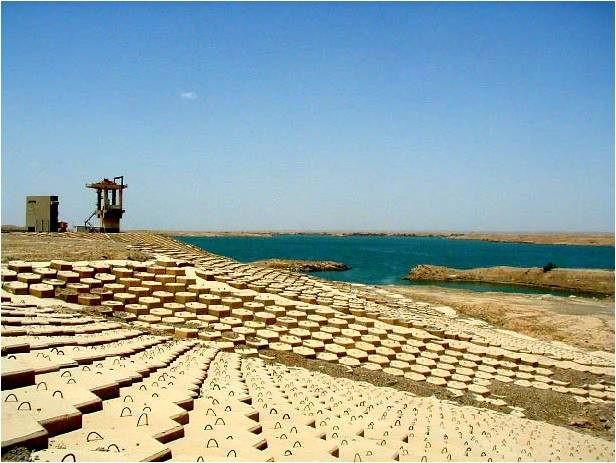

Physical characteristics
- Length: 230 km (140 mi)
- Basin size: 12,965 km^{2} (5,006 sq mi)

The ʿAdhaim (العظيم) is a river in Iraq that originates in the Zagros Mountains in Sulaymaniyah Governorate and joins the Tigris river after 230 kilometres (140 mi) at 34.002°N 44.293°E, some 30 kilometres (19 mi) downstream (east-to-southeast) of Samarra.

Its basin covers 12,965 square kilometres (5,006 mi^{2}). The river is fed by rainwater, with its highest discharge occurring from January through March.

== See also ==
- Adhaim Dam
