= Darbandikhan Dam =

Dam in Darbandikhan, Kurdistan, Iraq

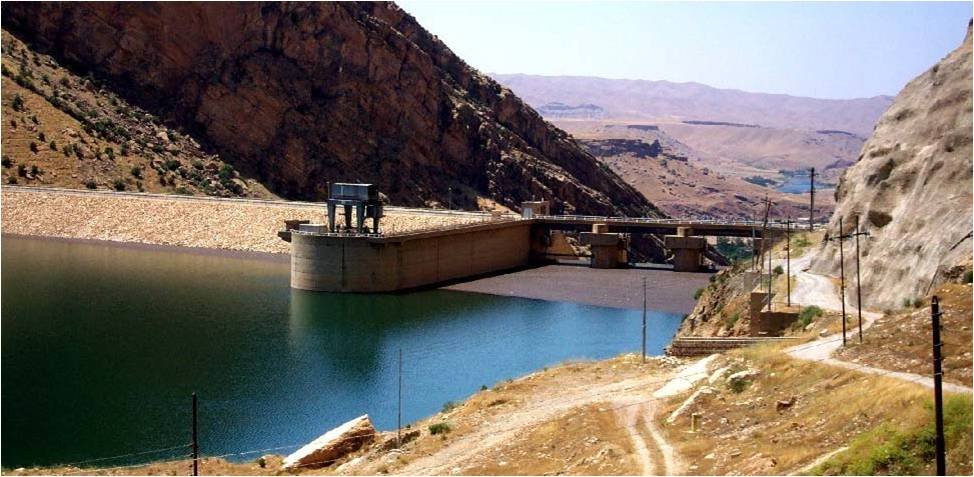
- Upstream side of the dam and spillway

- Location within Iraq
- Country: Iraq; Kurdistan Region
- Location: Darbandikhan (65 km southeast of Silêmani, Kurdistan Region)
- Coordinates: 35°06′46″N 45°42′23″E
- Status: Operational
- Construction began: 1956
- Opening date: 1961
- Owner: Ministry of Water Resources

Dam and spillways
- Type of dam: Embankment; rock-fill, central clay core
- Impounds: Sirwan River
- Height: 128 m (420 ft)
- Length: 445 m (1,460 ft)
- Elevation at crest: 495 m (1,624 ft)
- Width (crest): 17 m (56 ft)
- Dam volume: 7,100,000 m^{3} (9,286,449 cu yd)
- Spillway type: Controlled chute
- Spillway capacity: 11,400 m^{3}/s (402,587 cu ft/s)

Reservoir
- Total capacity: 3,000,000,000 m^{3} (2,432,140 acre⋅ft)
- Active capacity: 2,500,000,000 m^{3} (2,026,783 acre⋅ft)
- Inactive capacity: 500,000,000 m^{3} (405,357 acre⋅ft)
- Catchment area: 17,850 km^{2} (6,892 mi^{2})
- Surface area: 113 km^{2} (44 mi^{2})
- Normal elevation: 485 m (1,591 ft)

Power Station
- Commission date: 1990
- Hydraulic head: 80 m (262 ft) (rated)
- Turbines: 3 x 83 MW Francis-type
- Installed capacity: 249 MW

The Darbandikhan Dam (Kurdish: Bendava Derbendîxanê ,بەنداوی دەربەندیخان) is a multi-purpose embankment dam on the Diyala River in northern Sulaymaniyah Governorate, Iraq. It was constructed between 1956 and 1961. The purpose of the dam is irrigation, flood control, hydroelectric power production and recreation. Due to poor construction and neglect, the dam and its 249 MW power station have undergone several repairs over the years. A rehabilitation of the power station began in 2007 and was completed in 2013.

== Background ==
After the Harza Engineering Company of USA designed the dam, construction began in 1956. The reservoir began to fill in November 1961 and the dam was complete that same year. After the reservoir filled, several problems occurred. In 1967, there was a major slope failure about 100 m (328 ft) upstream of the dam. This and other slope failures are continually under repair. The bedrock beneath the dam has to be re-grouted and the crest of the dam settled too much, required it to be repaired. The rip-rap on the upstream face of the dam was also repaired in 1999 and 2000.

Between 1983 and 1985 the dam's power station was replaced by German (Polensky & Zöllner) and Japanese companies (Mitsui). The original 2 × 800 kW generators were replaced with the current power plant's 83 MW generators. The generators were commissioned in 1990 after the political situation in the country calmed. However, two of the generators were not commissioned correctly and the turbines suffered from severe cavitation. New spillway gates were installed between 1989 and 1990 after they were removed in 1988 because of the Iran–Iraq War. During the war, the spillway and substation were damaged from bombing. The power station was damaged from bombing in 1990 as well. In 2007, the World Bank began a US$35.36 million project to repair the Darbandikhan and Dokan Dams. Repairs to the Darbandikhan Dam cost $18.85 million and were completed in 2013 resulting in 100 percent power availability.

== Design and operation ==
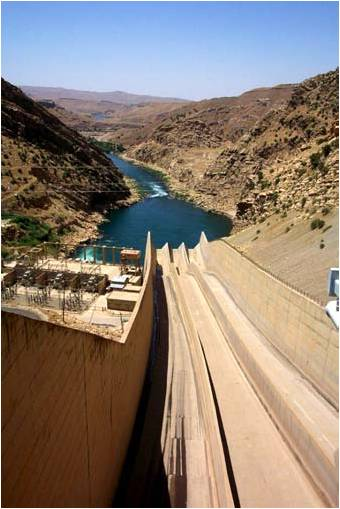
Looking down the spillway

The dam is located within a gorge on a foundation of sedimentary rocks. It is a rock-fill embankment type with a central clay core. The dam is 128 m (420 ft) tall and 445 m (1,460 ft) long (535 m (1,755 ft) if the spillway section is included). Its crest is 17 m (56 ft) wide and at an elevation of 495 m (1,624 ft). The structural volume of the dam including rock, clay and filters is 7,100,000 m^{3} (9,286,449 cu yd). The dam collects water from a catchment area that covers 17,850 km^{2} (6,892 mi^{2}). Its reservoir, by design, has a storage capacity of 3,000,000,000 m^{3} (2,432,140 acre⋅ft). Of that capacity, 2,500,000,000 m^{3} (2,026,783 acre⋅ft) is active (or useful) storage while 500,000,000 m^{3} (405,357 acre⋅ft) is dead storage. At a normal elevation of 485 m (1,591 ft), the reservoir covers an area of 113 km^{2} (44 mi^{2}).

To protect the dam from flooding, it is equipped with a controlled chute spillway on its right bank. It is controlled by three 15 m (49 ft) x 15 m tainter gates. At the terminus of each chute there is a ski-jump to help dissipate energy. The maximum discharge capacity of the spillway is 11,400 m^{3}/s (402,587 cu ft/s). The dam's power plant is located at its toe and contains 3 x 83 MW Francis turbine-generators. They are each afforded a rated hydraulic head of 80 m (262 ft) and can each discharge 113 m^{3}/s (3,991 cu ft/s). Above the tail-race for each turbine is an irrigation outlet. Each of the three outlets can discharge up to 175 m^{3}/s (6,180 cu ft/s) downstream.

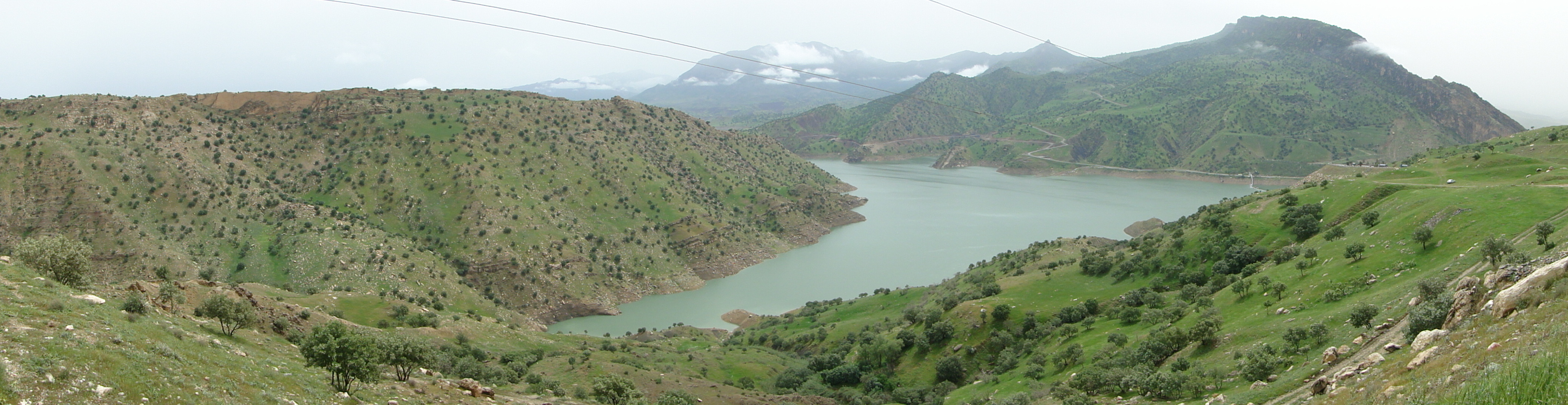
Lake Darbandikhan

== See also ==
- List of dams and reservoirs in Iraq
- List of power stations in Iraq
