= Turski =

Turski (feminine: Turska) is a Polish surname. Notable people with the surname include:

- Ewa Turska (born 1945), Polish-Canadian artist
- Hubert Turski (born 2003), Polish footballer
- Kaya Turski (born 1988), Canadian freestyle skier
- Marian Turski (1926–2025), Polish historian
- Zbigniew Turski (1908–1979), Polish composer

== See also ==
- Turški Vrh, settlement in Slovenia
