= The Nutcracker (1967 film) =

1967 Polish film

- Directed by: Halina Bielińska
- Written by: Halina Bielińska; Maria Krüger
- Based on: The Nutcracker and the Mouse King by E. T. A. Hoffmann
- Music by: Zbigniew Turski
- Release date: 1967
- Running time: 84 minutes
- Country: Polish People's Republic
- Language: Polish

The Nutcracker (Polish: Dziadek do orzechów) is a 1967 Polish film directed by Halina Bielińska and based on E.T.A. Hoffmann's 1816 novelette "The Nutcracker and the Mouse King".

== Cast ==
- Elżbieta Zagubień - Marynia
- Janusz Pomaski - Frycek
- Leon Niemczyk - Jan, the father
- Barbara Wrzesińska - Kulia, the mother
- Wieńczysław Gliński -
  - Drosselmajer,
  - E.T.A. Hoffmann
- Grzegorz Roman - Krystian Drosselmajer
- Zbigniew Miśkiewicz - The Nutcracker (voice) / Amadeusz Drosselmajer
- Józef Nalberczak - Mouse King (voice)
- Joanna Sołtan - Mouse Queen (voice)
- Joanna Walter - Antonina
- Bogusław Sochnacki - Baker
- Jan Gwiazdowski - Chancellor
- Juliusz Lubicz-Lisowski
- Adam Pawlikowski - Private secretary
- Krzysztof Litwin - Teodor Wajs, theology student
- Jerzy Wasowski - Criminal lawyer
- Magdalena Wołłejko - Court lady
- Aleksander Dzwonkowski - Surgeon
- Mirosława Lombardo -
- Krzysztof Świętochowski -
- Jerzy Barankiewicz - Astrologer
- Marek Kierlańczyk - King
- Maciej Miśkiewicz
- Piotr Bieliński
- Marek Perepeczko
- Krystyna Sienkiewicz
- Maria Ciesielska
- Iwona Biadoń
- Małgorzata Maciąg
- Seweryn Hys
- Justyna Fitowska
- Krystyna Kanonowicz
- Agnieszka Dylawerska
- Renata Fitowska
- Ewa Turska
- Adam Wojtyrowski
- Małgorzata Kalicińska
- Karol Małcużyński
- Renata Fitowska
- Aleksandra Leszczyńska
- Dorota Szymańska

== See also ==
- List of Christmas films
