= Maria Krüger =

Polish children's literature writer and journalist

- Born: September 6, 1904; Warsaw, Warsaw Governorate, Congress Poland
- Died: August 13, 1999 (aged 94); Warsaw, Masovian Voivodeship, Poland
- Resting place: Powązki Cemetery
- Education: Józef Piłsudski University of Warsaw
- Occupation: Author
- Relatives: Halina Bielińska
- Writing career
- Language: Polish
- Notable work: Karolcia
- Military career
- Allegiance: Home Army
- Unit: Epoka
- Conflicts: Warsaw Uprising
- Awards: Medal of Victory and Freedom 1945; Medal of the 10th Anniversary of People's Poland

Maria Krüger (1904–1999) was a Polish children's literature writer and journalist. Krüger participated in the Warsaw Uprising. Several of her children's books received radio and television adaptations, and have been required reading in Polish schools.

She is the daughter of author Edmund Krüger and Aniela Paulina Krüger (née Dobosiewicz), and older sister of director and animator Halina Bielińska.

Selected works:

- Karolcia (1959)
- Godzina pąsowej róży (1960)
- The Nutcracker (1967)
- Witaj, Karolciu (1970)
