= Karolcia =

1959 novel by Maria Krüger

- Author: Maria Krüger
- Language: Polish
- Genre: Children's novel
- Published: 1959
- Publication place: Poland
- Media type: Print (Hardback)
- Pages: 136
- OCLC: 254825808

Karolcia is a 1959 novel for children by Maria Krüger. In Poland it is required reading for classes I to III (7- to 9-year-olds).

== Plot ==
The protagonist (Karolcia) is an eight-year-old girl who finds a magical blue bead that fulfills her every wish. The girl and her friend Peter use the bead to bring happiness to other people. They have various adventures, including helping the President escape from an evil witch, Filomena, who also tries unsuccessfully to steal the bead. The bead becomes paler throughout the book and tells Karolcia that it will eventually vanish. Although Karolcia is unhappy about this, she and Peter decide not to be selfish with their final wish but to wish that the dreams of others be fulfilled –children receive new toys, and the recovery of children who are in hospital, amongst other things. The book ends with Karolcia being happy about their good deed but also sad over the loss of the bead that has now disappeared.

== Sequels ==
The success of novels for young readers encouraged the author to write a sequel. In 1970, she wrote the novel Witaj, Karolciu ("Hello, Karolcia”), about new adventures of Karolcia and Piotr. In 2009, another author, Krzysztof Zięcik, added further adventures in Karolcia na wakacjach ("Karolcia on vacation”).

Both Karolcia and Hello Karolcia are available as audio books, read by Maria Seweryn.

== Reception ==
In the British IBBY newsletter IBBYLink, Maria Ostasz, while discussing Polish children's novels during the 1960s, wrote "Very popular among young female readers at the time were Maria Krüger’s Karolcia [Caroline] (1959), ..." and noted "The protagonists of these novels do not live through any great conflicts but experience the joy of being together among their peers, family and friends."

== Adaptations ==
In 1995 the book was made into a TV movie of the same name. In 2001 filming of another movie commenced. The director was to be Jowita Gondek. By 2008 about 80% of the film had been made but it was never completed.
