= Zbigniew Turski =

Polish composer

Olympic medal record

Art competitions
Gold medal – first place	1948 London	Compositions for Orchestra

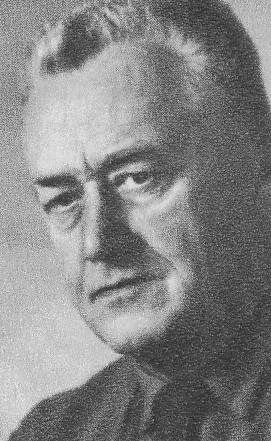

Zbigniew Turski (21 July 1908 – 6 January 1979) was a Polish composer. He was born in Konstancin and died in Warsaw. Polish composer and conductor Zbigniew Turski won the gold medal at the 1948 London Olympic Art Competitions for his Symfonia Olimpijska ("Olympic Symphony") in the category of Music, Compositions for Orchestra.

A graduate of the Warsaw Conservatory, Turski became musical director of Warsaw Radio in 1939. In 1945, he co-founded the Baltic Philharmonic. He taught composition at the Warsaw Theatre Academy (1948–49) and later at the Warsaw Chopin Academy of Music (1951–52). From 1957 until shortly before his death, he served as music director of the Contemporary Theatre in Warsaw, and in 1959–60 he was president of the Polish Composers' Union. Turski was particularly renowned for his theatre music.

== Selected film music ==
- The Nutcracker (1967 film)
