= Halina Bielińska =

Polish film director

- Born: Halina Aniela Krüger; August 14, 1914; Warsaw, Warsaw Governorate, Congress Poland
- Died: October 13, 1989 (aged 75); Warsaw, Warsaw Voivodeship, Polish People's Republic
- Resting place: Powązki Cemetery
- Notable work: The Nutcracker
- Children: Piotr Bieliński
- Relatives: Maria Krüger

Halina Bielińska (14 August 1914 - 13 October 1989) was a Polish film director, animator and screenwriter.

Bielińska and Włodzimierz Haupe were among the first Polish animators; their film Zmiana warty (Changing of the Guard) was awarded the Short Film Prize at the Cannes Film Festival in 1959.

Bielińska was born in Warsaw on 14 August 1914. She died there on 13 October 1989 at the age of 75.

== Selected filmography ==
Feature Films

- Szczęściarz Antoni (1961)
- Godzina pąsowej róży (1963)
- Sam pośród miasta (1965)
- The Nutcracker (Dziadek do orzechów) (1967)
- Piąta rano (1969)

Animated Films

- Katarynka (1956)
- Zmiana warty (1958)
- But (1959)
