= Ewa Turska =

Polish-Canadian artist

Ewa Turska (born 23 August 1945) is a Polish-Canadian artist. Turska was born in Warsaw, Poland. Her work is included in the collections of the Musée d'art contemporain de Montréal and the National Gallery of Canada.
