= List of Islamic structures in Mosul =

This is a list of Islamic structures in Mosul. Islam is the majority religion in Mosul. Muslims of Mosul are predominantly followers of Sunni Islam, with a minority of Shi'ites.

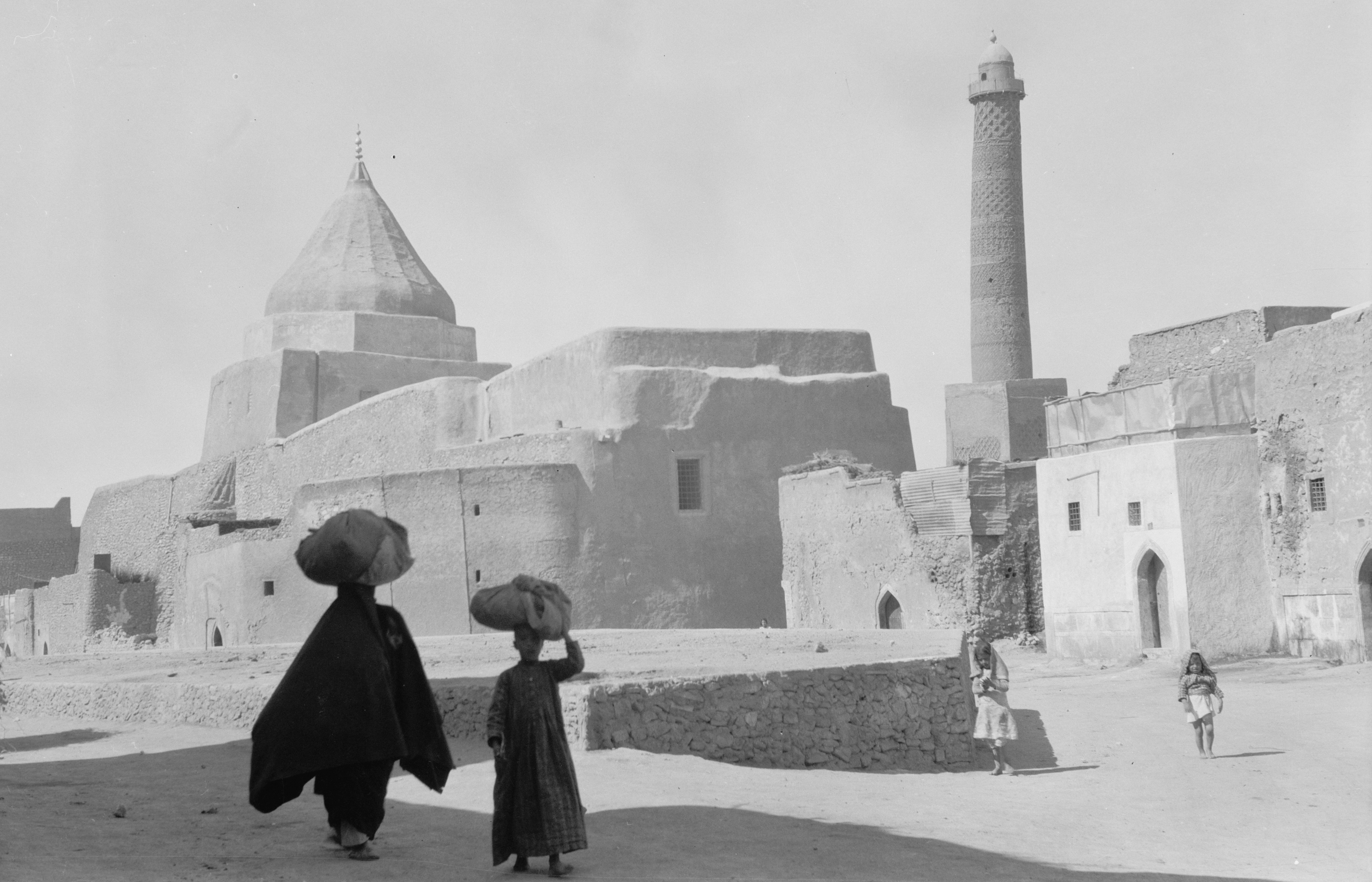
The shrine of Imam Awn al-Din ibn Hasan on the left, and the historic Al-Hadba Minaret to the right in 1932.

== Modern mosques ==
Mosul Grand Mosque: Situated in the Taqafah district bordering the Tigris river near the Nineveh archaeological site. Its construction started during the rule of Saddam Hussein, but just like the Al-Rahman Mosque, the construction was interrupted because of the political instability in the country. The mosque remains incomplete to this day.

== Historic mosques and shrines ==
Inside Mosul
Building	Image	District/Quarter	Denomination	First built	Period	Notes
Umayyad Mosque of Mosul		Old City of Mosul	Sunni	Est. 637	Rashidun	Considered to be the oldest mosque to be established in Mosul, left for decay for many periods until it was demolished in 1810 and rebuilt, After an extensive damage in 2017 it was renovated and reopened in 2024
Great Mosque of Al-Nuri		Old City of Mosul	Sunni	1172–1173	Zengid	First built by Nur al-Din Zangi in 1172–1173. It is best known for its leaning minaret, known as "Al-Hadba" (the hunchback). The prayer hall was rebuilt in the mid 20th century, between 1940 and 1950. Destroyed in 2017 during the Battle of Mosul and was undergoing an extensive restoration process before its reopening in November 2024.
Al-Nabi Yunus Mosque		An Nabi Yunus	Sunni	1365	Seljuk	Built over an old Assyrian Christian church. It is believed to contain the remains of Jonah. Demolished in 2014 by the Islamic State of Iraq and the Levant.
Al-Nabi Jirjis Mosque		Old City of Mosul	Sunni	1393	Timurid	Construction was ordered by Tamerlane in 1393. Contains a tomb believed to be that of Saint George. Features two prayer halls for the Shafi'i and Hanafi adherents. Demolished in 2014 by the Islamic State of Iraq and the Levant.
Al-Nabi Shith Mosque		Ar Rafidayn	Sunni	1815	Ottoman	Believed to contain the tomb of Seth, son of Adam. Formerly part of a large cemetery and surrounded by mausoleums which are not present anymore. A completely new structure was built between the 1970s to 1980s. Demolished in 2014 by the Islamic State of Iraq and the Levant but undergoing reconstruction.
Imam al-Baher Mosque		Mahallat al-Imam al-Bahir	Sunni	1259	Zengid	Built in the Zengid era by Badr al-Din Lu'lu. Entombs the remains of Imam al-Bahir, a descendant of Muhammad. Demolished in 2014 by the Islamic State of Iraq and the Levant, but was reconstructed in 2022.
Mausoleum of Yahya Abu al-Qasim		Shafaa	Sunni	1239	Zengid	Built in the Zengid era by Badr al-Din Lu'lu. Entombs the remains of Yahya Abu al-Qasim ibn Hasan, a descendant of Muhammad. Demolished in 2014 by the Islamic State of Iraq and the Levant.
Al-Imam Muhsin Mosque		Shafaa	Sunni	12th century	Seljuk (mosque and madrasah), Zengid (shrine)	Formerly a mosque and madrasah complex built during the Seljuk era, the madrasah was converted into a shrine for Muhsin ibn Ali by Badr al-Din Lu'lu in the Zengid era. Demolished in 2017 by Iraqi airstrikes during the Battle of Mosul.
Mausoleum of Imam Awn Al-Din		Bab at-Tub	Sunni	1248	Zengid	Built by Badr al-Din Lu'lu, the structure survived the Mongol invasions of the 13th century. It entombs the remains of Awn al-Din ibn Hasan. Demolished in 2014 by the Islamic State of Iraq and the Levant.
Hamu al-Qadu Mosque		Al Midan	Sunni	1881	Ottoman	Built in the Ottoman era by Abdullah Chalabi, a wealthy merchant. Contains the tomb of Ala al-Din, who is a descendant of Abdul Qadir al-Jilani. Demolished in 2014 by the Islamic State of Iraq and the Levant.
Shrine of Shaykh Fathi al-Mawsili		Bab Sinjar	Sufi			A religious complex, it includes a mosque as well as the tomb of Al-Fath al-Mawsili, a revered ascetic who lived in Mosul.
Sultan Wais Mosque		Old City of Mosul	Sunni	1683	Ottoman	Built during in 1683 over an older Jalayirid lodge and musalla.

Outside Mosul (in Nineveh Governorate)
Building	Image	Location	Denomination	First built	Period	Notes
Sayyidah Zaynab Mosque		Sinjar	Shi'ite	1239	Zengid	Built by Badr al-Din Lu'lu, destroyed by the Mongols but later rebuilt in the later Ilkhanid era. Contains the tomb of Zaynab, a daughter of Ali ibn Husayn. Demolished in 2014 by the Islamic State of Iraq and the Levant, but restored in 2019.

== Castles and fortresses ==
Qara Saray (Black Palace): Built in the 13th century by Badr al-Din Lu'lu. Damaged during the Mongol invasions via burning.

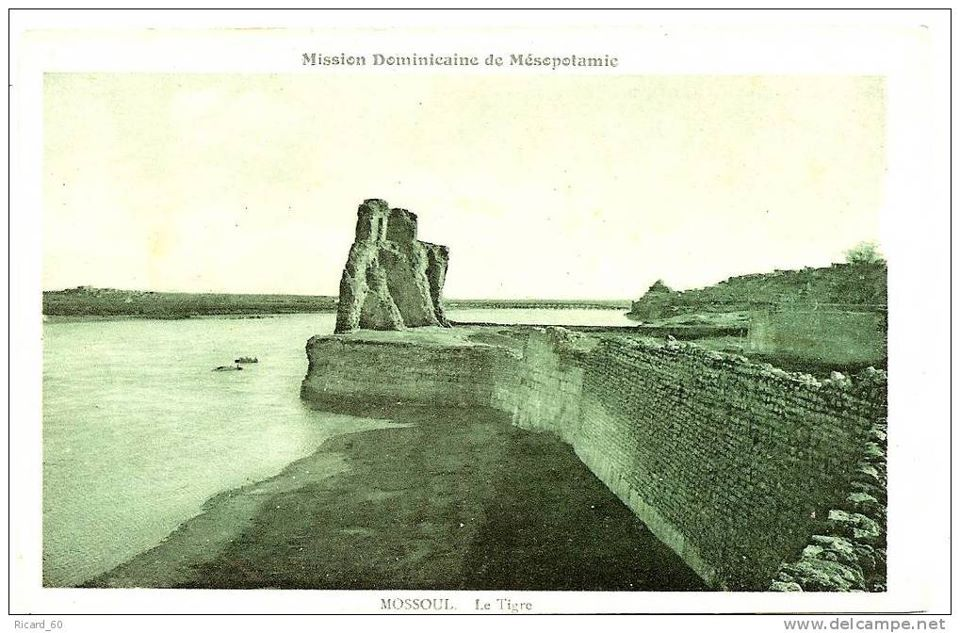
A photograph of Qara Saray on an old postcard.

== Other monuments ==
- Tomb of the Girl: A small domed memorial believed to be built over the grave of a female mystic, located in the middle of a street near Bab Sinjar. Historical research proves that it was built over the grave of the historian Ibn al-Athir, which the government has officially stated, with a stele built on the tombstone to indicate his burial there. Bulldozed in 2014 by the Islamic State of Iraq and the Levant.
- Nizamiyya Madrasa: Located northwest of the Great Mosque, it was built by Nizam al-Mulk in the 11th century, as part of the Nizamiyya series of Islamic schools. It was converted into a shrine for a patron saint, Ali al-Asghar, in the 12th century during the Zengid period and later renovated in 1330 by the Jalayirids. Later traditions ascribed the shrine to an unspecified Shaykh al-Nuri during the Timurid period.

== See also ==
- List of mosques in Iraq
