= Sultan Wais Mosque =

Ottoman-era mosque in Mosul, Iraq

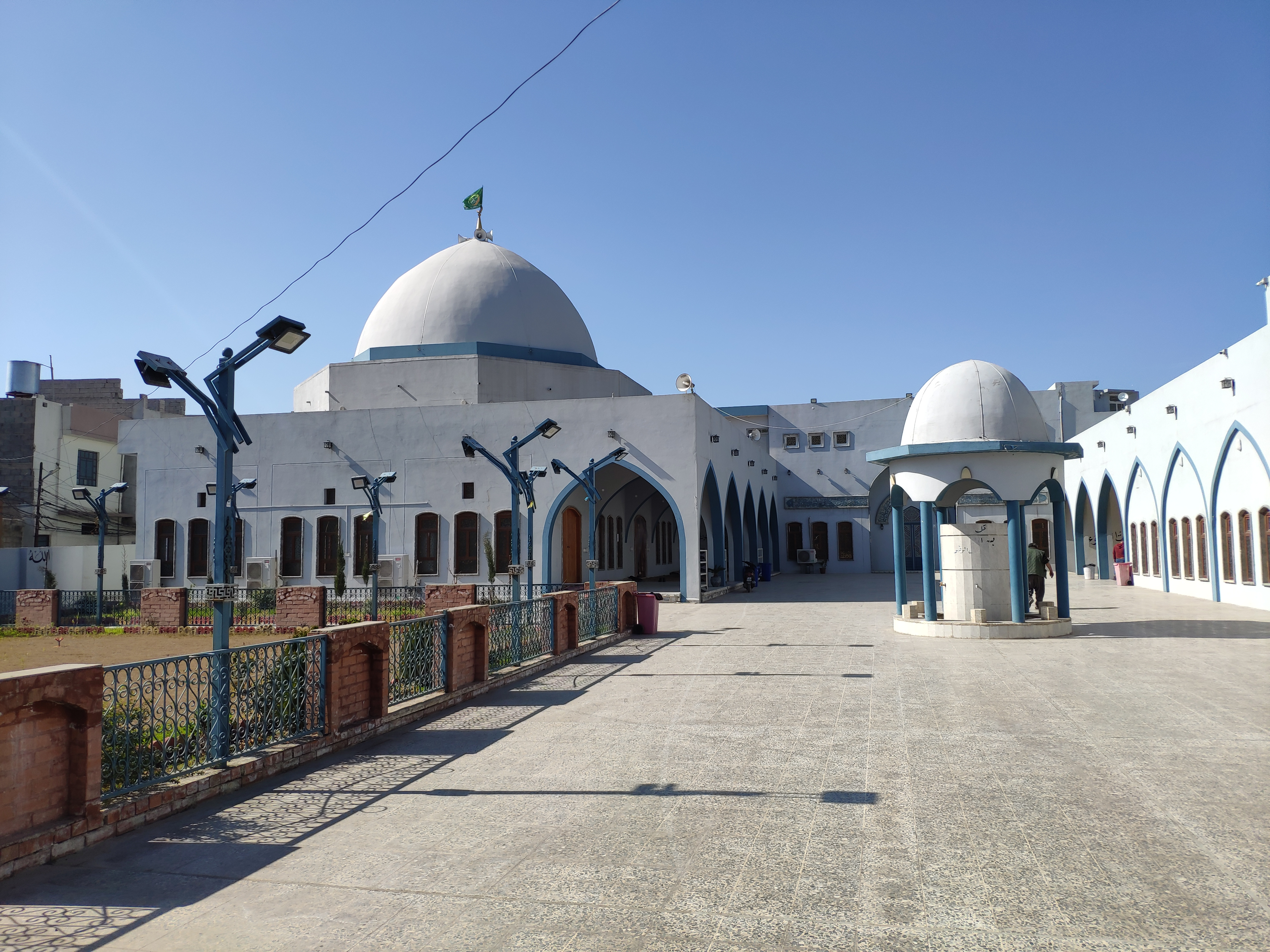
- The Sultan Wais Mosque, photographed in 2026.

- Location in Iraq

Religion
- Affiliation: Sunni Islam

Location
- Location: 84WF+48X, Mosul, Nineveh Governorate, Iraq
- Country: Iraq
- Interactive map of Sultan Wais Mosque
- Coordinates: 36.3455215°N 43.1234394°E

Architecture
- Type: Mosque
- Style: Ottoman architecture
- Completed: 1685 (original); 1838 (reconstruction)
- Dome: 5

The Sultan Wais Mosque (Arabic: جامع السلطان ويس) is a mosque located in the Old City quarter of Mosul, Iraq. Built in the second half of the 17th century during the Ottoman period, it was originally named after Shaykh Uways, the second ruler of the Jalayirid dynasty, although it later became erroneously attributed to the Muslim saint Uways al‑Qarani. The mosque is built in a traditional Ottoman architectural style with Iraqi elements.

== History ==
The original structure at the site was a 14th-century tekke that was named after its founder, the Jalayirid ruler Shaykh Uways, although the name of the site had later been corrupted into "Sultan Wais" which led locals to believe that the tekke was the burial place of Uwais al-Qarni, a member of the Tabi'een and an honorary Sahabi who was held in high reverence by the predominately Sunni Muslim population of Mosul. During the Timurid attacks on Mosul in the late 14th century, the tekke was one of the Islamic establishments that were spared in the rampage throughout the city, while also being frequented as a gathering place by the Uwaisi tariqat. During the Ottoman rule over Mosul, the tekke was demolished and a new mosque was built in its place between 1683 and 1685 by Hajj Juma'a al-Hadithi, a Muslim nobleman, to honour Uwais al-Qarni. A madrasa was also established in the northern sector of the mosque in 1853 to serve as a centre of education for the youths of Mosul. The present day mosque, however, dates back to 1838.

The mosque was destroyed with explosives in 2015 by the Dawlah terrorist group during their occupation of Mosul. The reason given for the destruction of the mosque was that it contained graves, although no tombs were actually present in the mosque. After the armies of Dawlah had been expelled from Mosul, reconstruction works began in 2019 and were completed by January 2022.

== Architecture ==
The Sultan Wais Mosque is built in a simplified form of the traditional Ottoman architectural style while incorporating Seljuk and Iraqi architectural elements into the mix. The dome of the mosque sits on a square base, with four smaller domes surrounding it, in typical Ottoman fashion. The mosque consists of a main prayer hall, courtyard, and madrasa.

Plaster pillars act as support columns in the main prayer hall of the mosque, which has a fully carpeted floor. There are also two mihrabs in the mosque, one being the original mihrab from the tekke of Shaykh Uways, the other part of the 17th-century structure. Within the northern part of the mosque is the madrasa, which contains classrooms, staff offices, as well as a dormitory for students. The main prayer hall is not in-line along the street and skewers off in a direction in order to face Mecca, the direction for Islamic prayer.

== See also ==
- Great Mosque of al-Nuri
- Islamic sites of Mosul
