= Nizamiyya of Mosul =

Islamic instutition located in Mosul, Iraq

Nizamiyya Madrasa
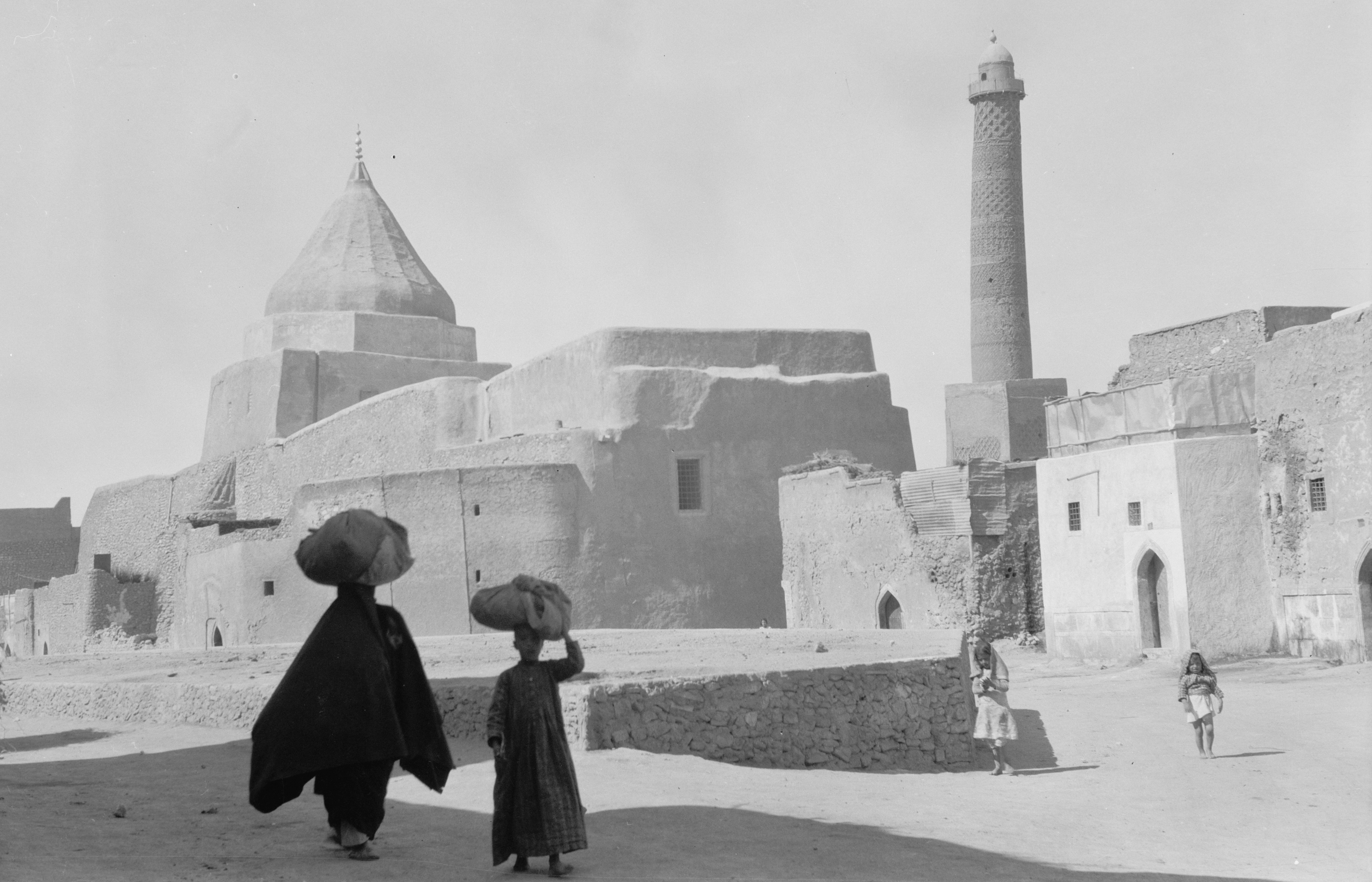
- A 1932 photograph of the madrasa, with the "al-Hadba" minaret in the background.
- Interactive map of Nizamiyya Madrasa
- 36°20′37″N 43°07′34″E
- Type: Madrasa (Nizamiyya-type)
- Location: Mosul, Iraq

History
- Built: 11th century

Site notes
- Architectural style: Seljuk architecture

The Nizamiyya Madrasa (Arabic: مدرسة نظامية, lit. Madrasa Niẓāmīya), later known as the Shrine of Imam Ali al-Asghar, is a madrasa located northwest of the Great Mosque in Mosul, Iraq. It was built in the 11th century on the orders of Nizam al-Mulk, the vizier of the Seljuk rulers Alp Arslan and Malik Shah. During the Atabeg period in the 13th century, the madrasa was converted into a shrine by the emir of Mosul, Badr ad-Din Lu'lu.

== History ==
Nizam al-Mulk, vizier of the Seljuk rulers Alp Arslan and Malik Shah, established several Islamic schools throughout Iraq, Persia and Khorasan; these schools became known as the Nizamiyya series. The school in Mosul was built towards the end of the 11th century and was situated northwest of the Great Mosque, which was the largest Islamic establishment in the city. During the Atabeg period, Badr ad-Din Lu'lu (r. 1234–1259) reconstructed the madrasa and converted one of its rooms into a shrine and tomb for a patron saint, Imam Ali al-Asghar. This was merely done as part of a 13th-century campaign to promote Shi'ism by Badr ad-Din Lu'lu, and no actual human remains lie in the supposed tomb. During the Jalayirid period, the madrasa was extensively renovated in 1330. After the Timurids entered Mosul, the identity of the shrine changed from Ali al-Asghar to an unspecified Shaykh al-Nuri, who was implied to have been a relative or descendant of Nur ad-Din Zangi, although this change was later reverted. In 1942, the madrasa was dismantled along with the Great Mosque next to it and rebuilt from the ground up in a restoration programme.

The Nizamiyya Madrasa was destroyed by the terrorist group Dawlah after their takeover of Mosul in 2014 and was used as a carpark. The madrasa was rebuilt in 2024 as part of the reconstruction of the adjacent Great Mosque, although the shrine for Imam Ali al-Asghar is not visible anymore, probably due to the fact that it is an empty tomb.

== Architecture ==
The madrasa is of a rectangular layout and plan, with a prayer hall and a courtyard in front. In the madrasa, the central chamber is the school building which contains the classrooms and administrative offices. Two rooms at the end of this chamber contain tombs; one of them is a domed chamber containing the wooden shrine of Imam Ali al-Asghar, while the second room contains a tomb to an unknown personage, in the form of a sanduga made out of dark marble. The identity of the entombed is unknown, but is commonly attributed to Badr ad-Din Lu'lu himself. Various decorative tiles line the interior of the building, as well as muqarnas at the main inner entrance.

== See also ==
- Great Mosque of al-Nuri
- Islamic sites of Mosul
