= Mawsili =

Mawṣilī (Arabic: موصلي) is an Arabic locational surname or nisba, which means a person from al-Mawṣil, Iraq. It may refer to:

- al-Fath al-Mawsili
- Ubayd Allah ibn al-Habhab al-Mawsili
- Mahmud bin Sheet Khattab al-Mawsili
- Muhammad ibn Abi al-Wafa al-Mawsili
- Ammar al-Mawsili
- Ishaq al-Mawsili
- Ibrahim al-Mawsili
