= Al-Nabi Jirjis Mosque =

Mosque in Mosul, Iraq

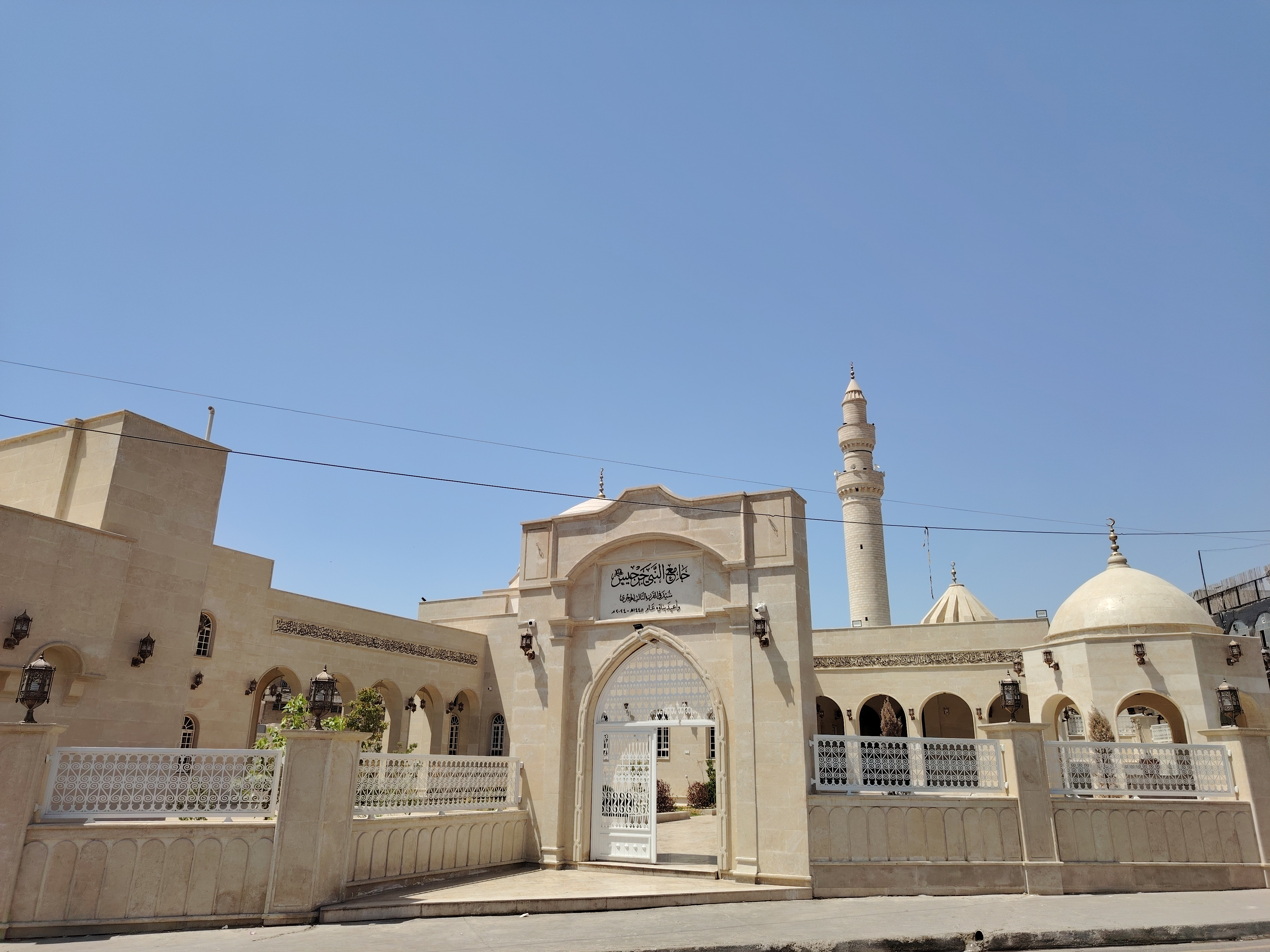
- The Al-Nabi Jirjis Mosque in 2026.

- Location in Iraq

Religion
- Affiliation: Sunni Islam

Location
- Location: 84VJ+Q44, Mosul, Nineveh Governorate, Iraq
- Country: Iraq
- Coordinates: 36°20′40″N 43°07′49″E

Architecture
- Type: Mosque and mausoleum
- Style: Timurid, Ottoman
- Founder: Tamerlane (current mosque)
- Completed: c. 12th century (original structure); 1393 (current structure)

Specifications
- Dome: 2
- Minaret: 1
- Shrine: 1
- Materials: Sandstone

The Al-Nabi Jirjis Mosque (Arabic: جامع النبي جرجيس) is a mosque located in Mosul, Iraq. It is named after Saint George, known in Islamic tradition as Jirjis, who is believed by locals to be buried in the mausoleum attached to the mosque. While the date of construction of the mausoleum is unknown, the mosque was built by Tamerlane in the 14th century.

== History ==
The origin of the mausoleum is unknown, with some believing that it was originally the shrine of Al-Hurr ibn Yusuf, but his name hidden and replaced with that of Saint George over time in order to ensure the mausoleum would be kept protected for generations. The mausoleum is mentioned in the 12th-century writings of Ibn Jubayr as being part of a larger mosque complex. Yaqut al-Hamawi, writing from the 13th century, reports that Mosul was known as the city of the Saint George due to the existence of his purported tomb. After the Turco-Mongol conqueror Tamerlane entered Mosul, he demolished the older mosque and reconstructed it as a larger structure in 1393 after seizing the city from the Jalayirids. The Timurids spared the city from complete destruction and instead focused on restoring older Islamic institutions for the benefit of the local Muslim community, which included maintenance of the mosque. Then in the 18th century, the governor of Mosul under Ottoman suzerainty, Hajj Hussein Pasha al-Jalili, renovated the mosque and added a main prayer hall for the Shafi'i school of thought. The minaret was also reconstructed in 1853 to replace the old one, which was dilapidating. An earthquake damaged the mosque in 1910, which resulted in it being rebuilt completely out of sandstone in order to strengthen the structure, while a new main dome for the mosque was erected over the old Timurid-era dome.

In 2014, the Islamic State demolished the mosque, believing it to be a place of idolatry due to the presence of the mausoleum. After the terrorist group was expelled from Mosul, the mosque was rebuilt into its original form and reopened for prayers in 2024, along with the nearby Al-Nabi Shith Mosque.

== Architecture ==
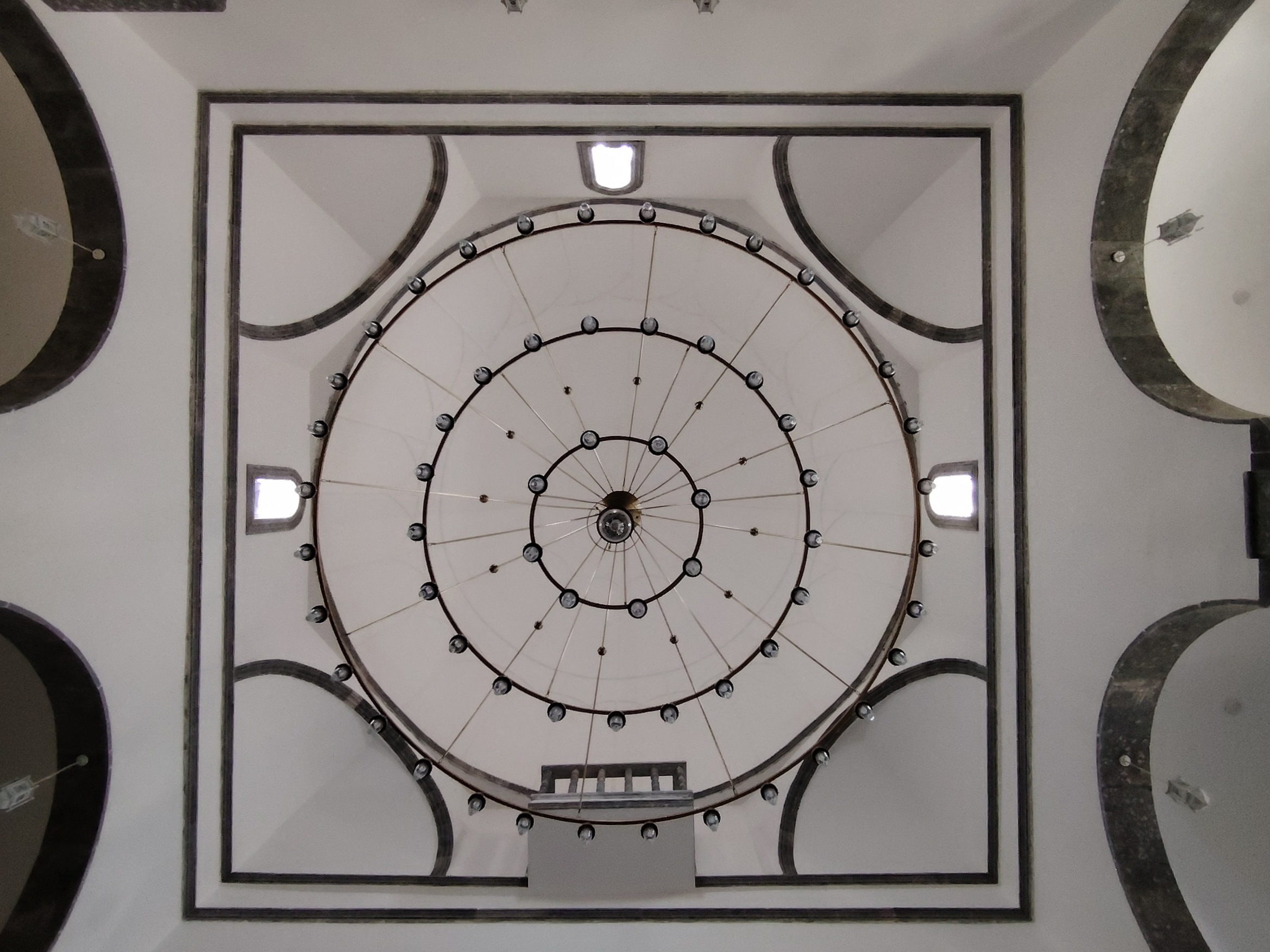
A view underneath the main dome of the mosque.

The mosque is built with Timurid architecture and has two main prayer halls, one belonging to the Shafi'i rite and the other belonging to the Hanafi rite, with the Shafi'i one more commonly used due to being larger. The former is rectangular in layout, consisting of five bays resting on pointed arches. The latter is square in layout and is held up by four pillars. Muqarnas detailing lines the main mihrab of the mosque, which is said to have been transplanted from the original mausoleum by Tamerlane after he had rebuilt the structure.

The tomb room is located next to the main prayer halls. It is positioned in such a way that prevents the tomb from being located behind the main qibla wall of the mosque. It is a square room, topped by a ribbed dome, while the grave purported to be that of Saint George lies in the centre of the floor under a simple sanduga.

The minaret of the mosque is built in the Ottoman architectural style, dating back to 1853. It stands out from the rest of the mosque due to being built in the Turkish style, unlike the Timurid style of the mosque itself.

== Other locations of the tomb of Jirjis ==
In Palestine, a Mamluk mosque annexed to a Crusader-era cathedral contaning a purported tomb of St. George can be found. Located in the city of Lod, the mosque and church co-exist alongside each other, with Muslims being allowed to visit the church to pay their respects to Jirjis.

== Gallery ==
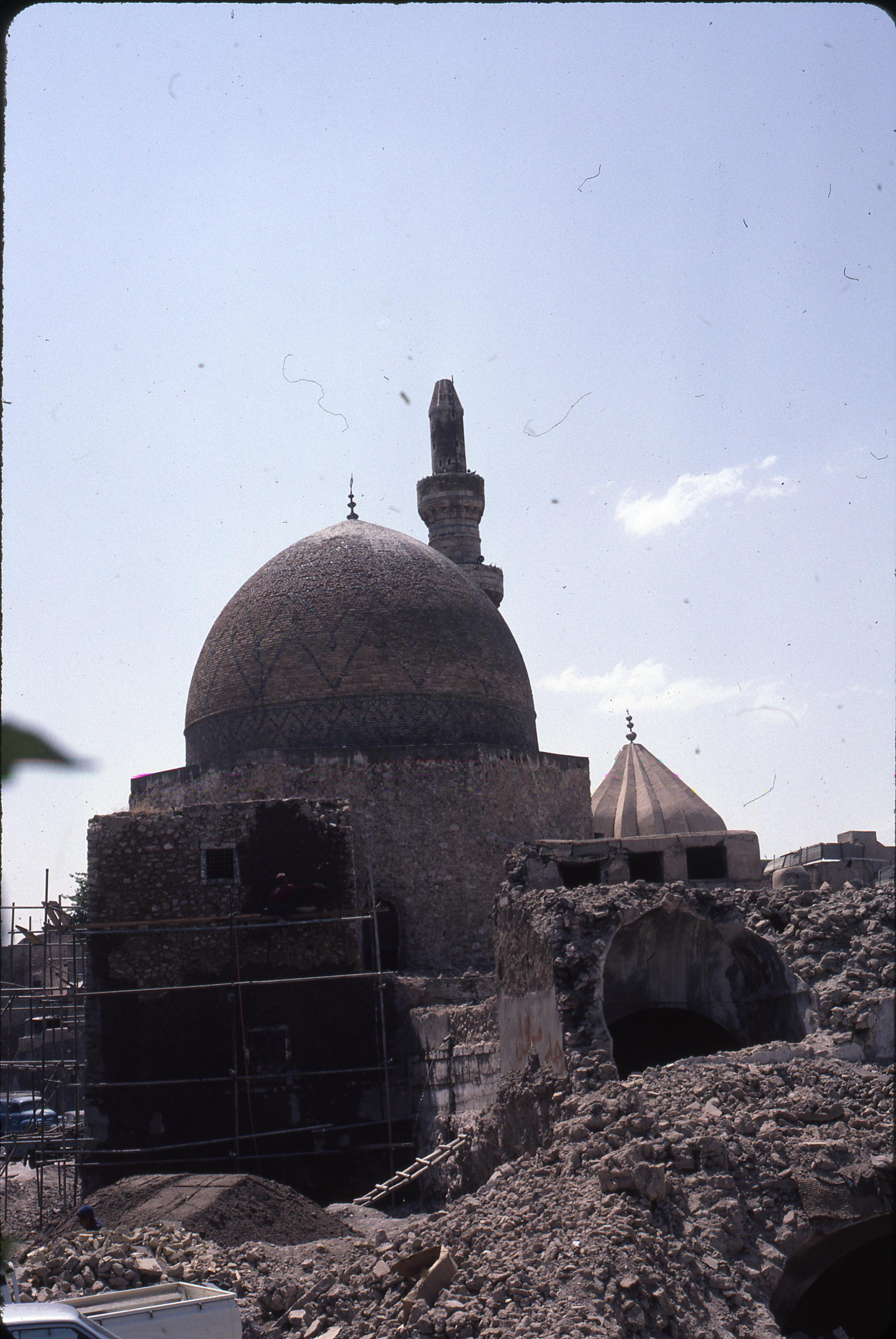
A 1982 photograph of the mosque, from the Mediterranean House of Human Sciences, a French research unit.

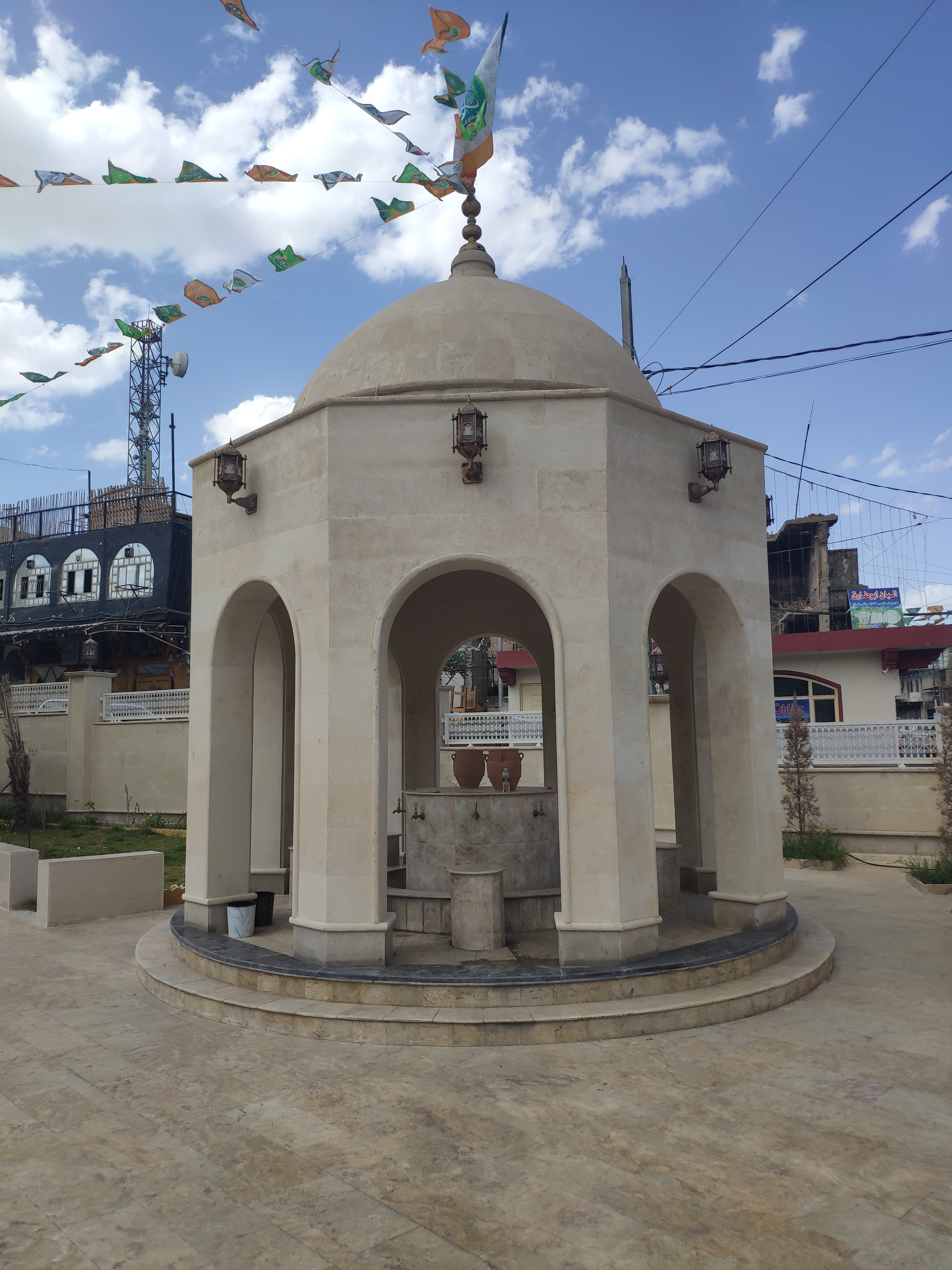
The sabil, where the worshippers take their ablution.

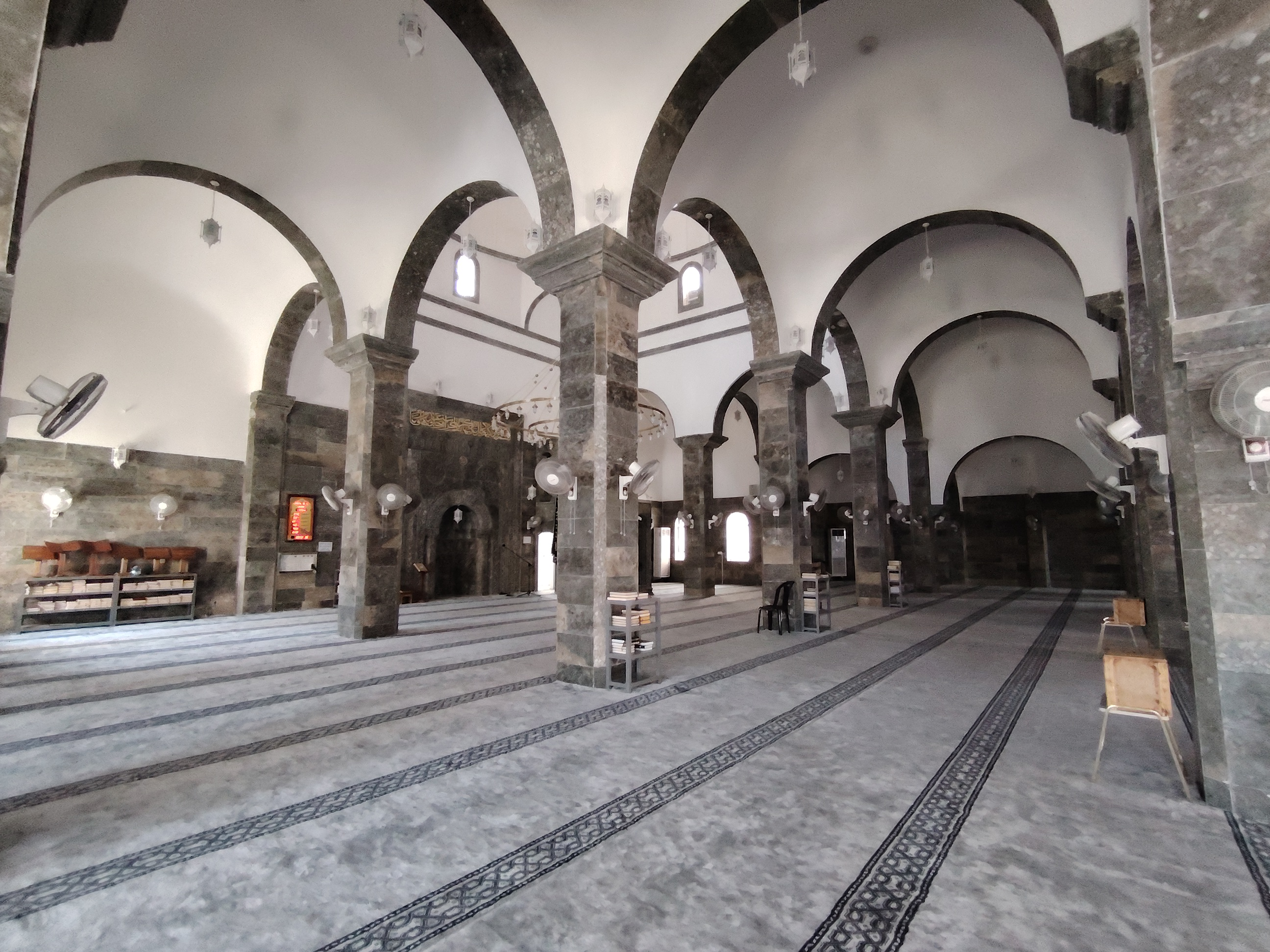
Inside the main prayer hall of the mosque.

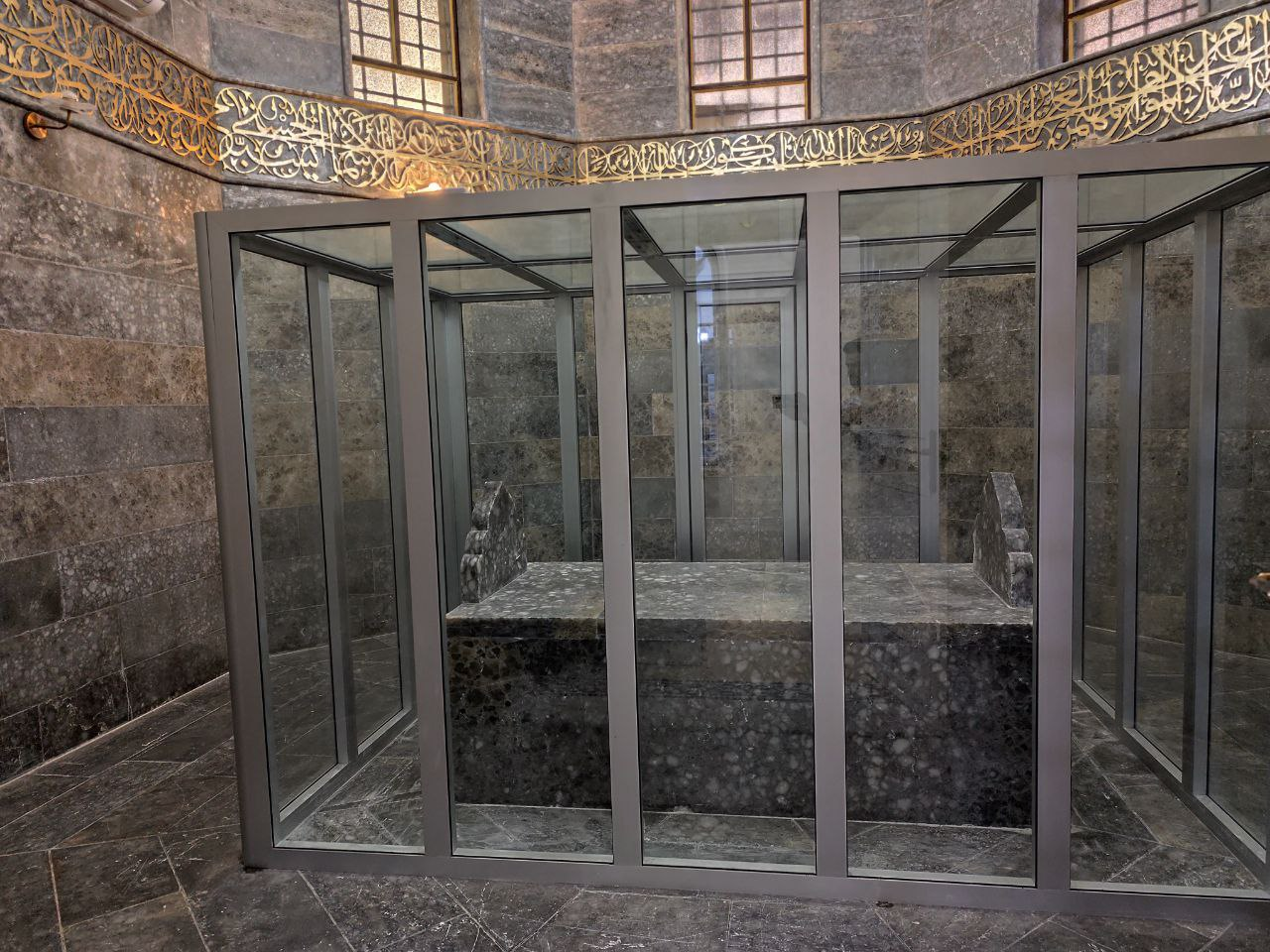
The tomb of Jirjis in the domed mausoleum next to the mosque.

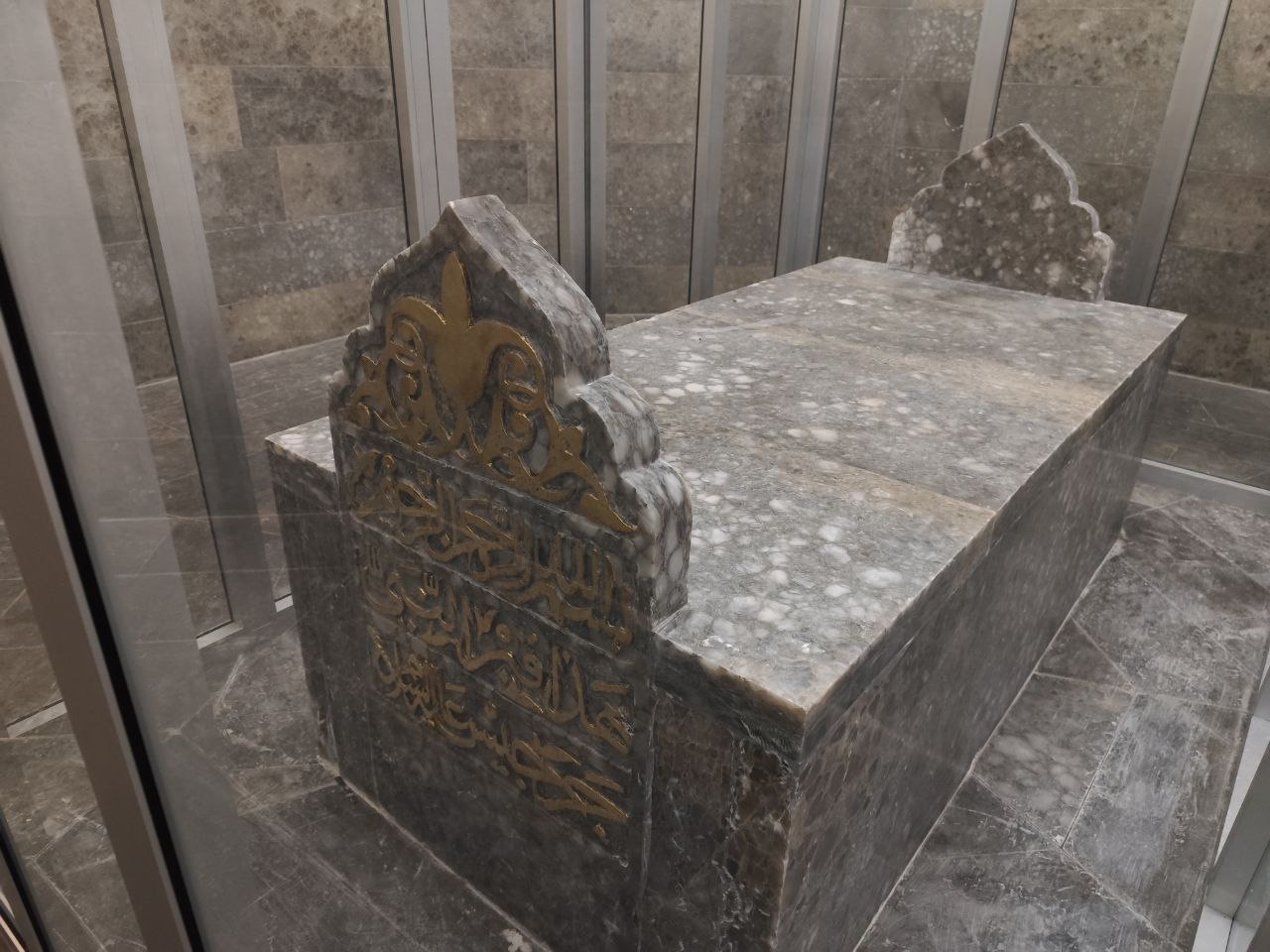
Sanduga over the grave of Jirjis.

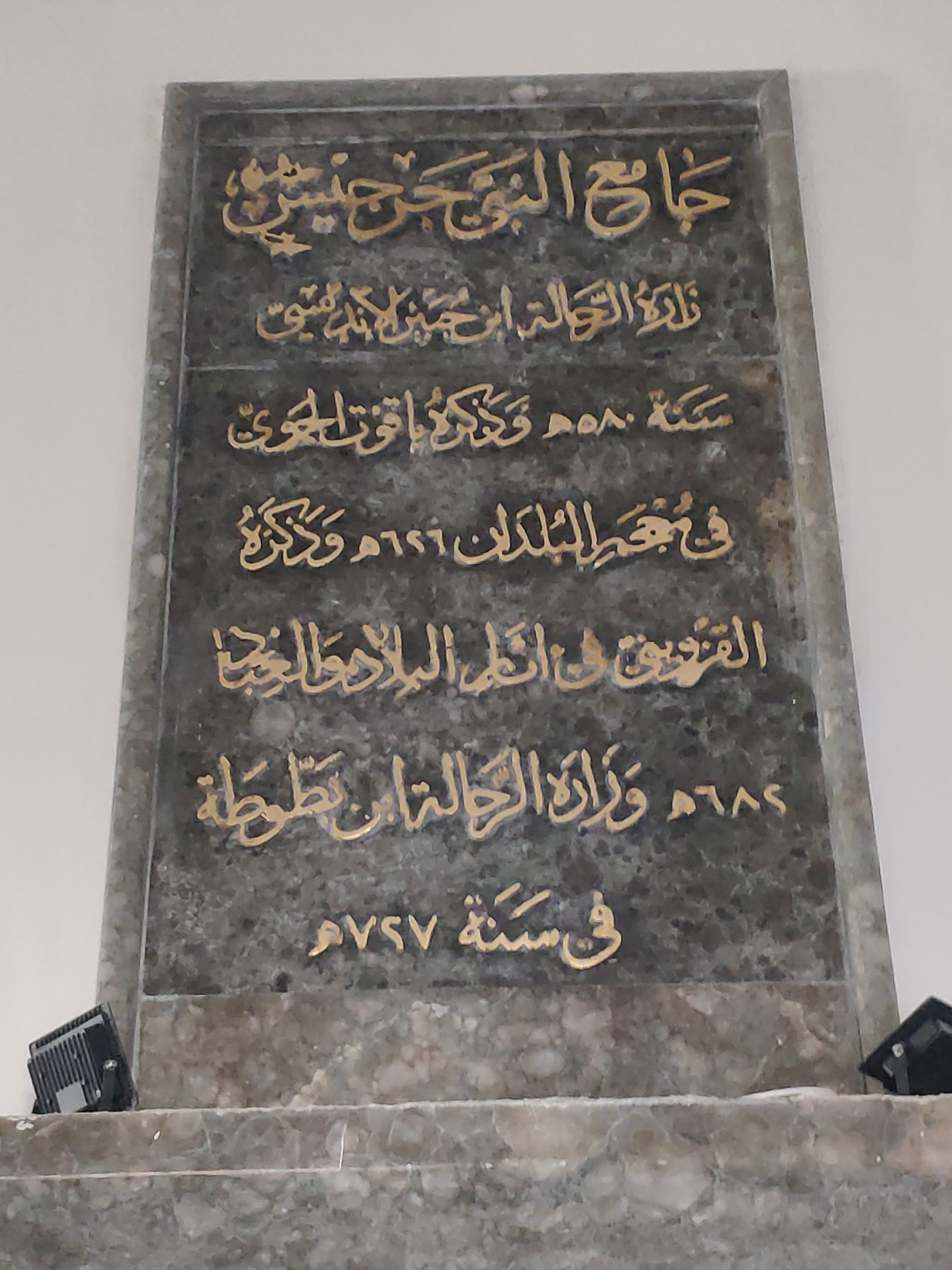
A stone inscription in the mosque that commemorates a visit of Yaqut al-Hamawi and famed traveller Ibn Battuta.

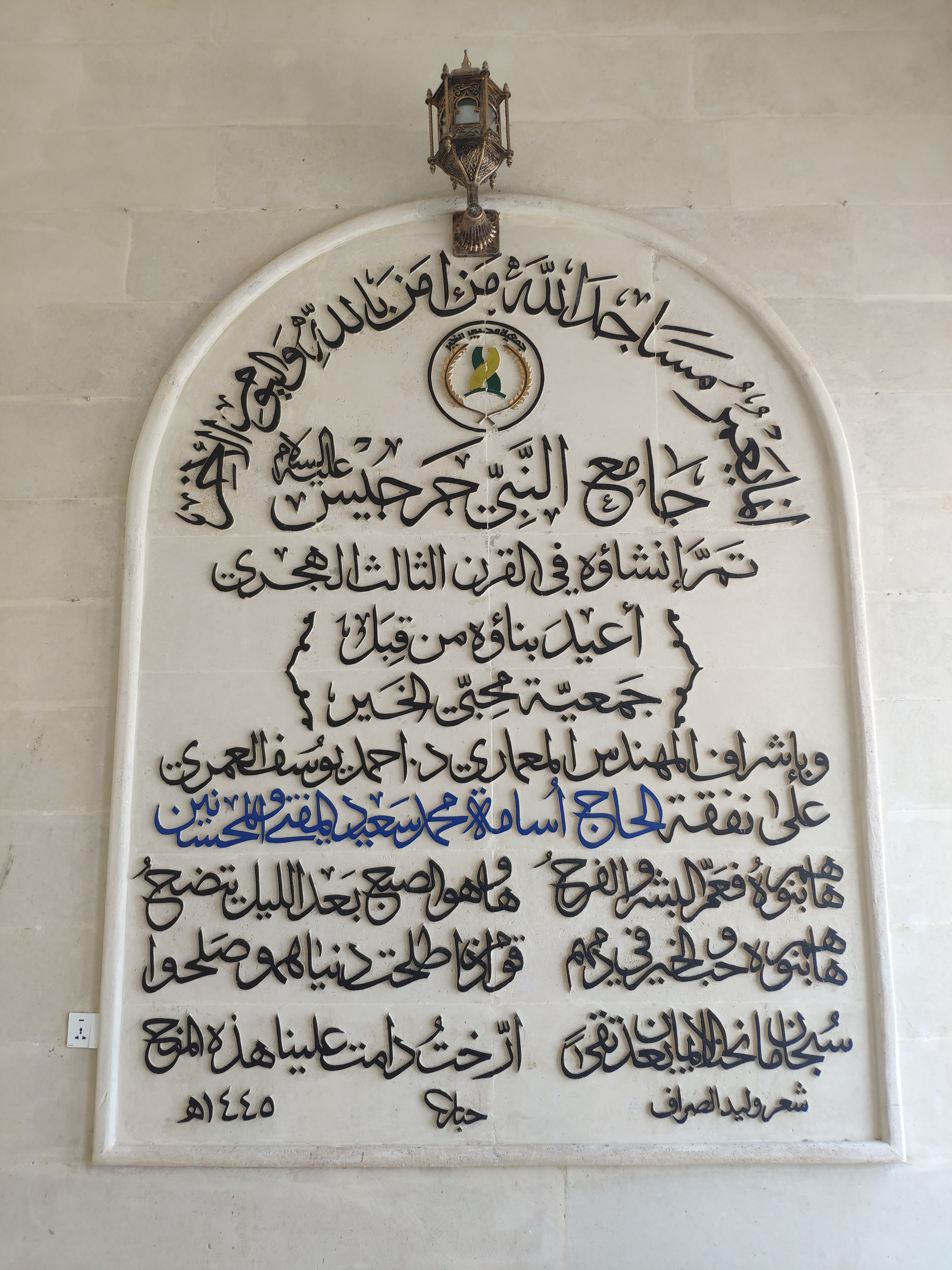
Inscription to commemorate the reconstruction of the mosque in 2024.

== See also ==
- List of mosques in Mosul
