= Shrine of Shaykh Fathi al-Mawsili =

Historic religious complex in Mosul, Iraq

- مرقد فتحي الموصلي
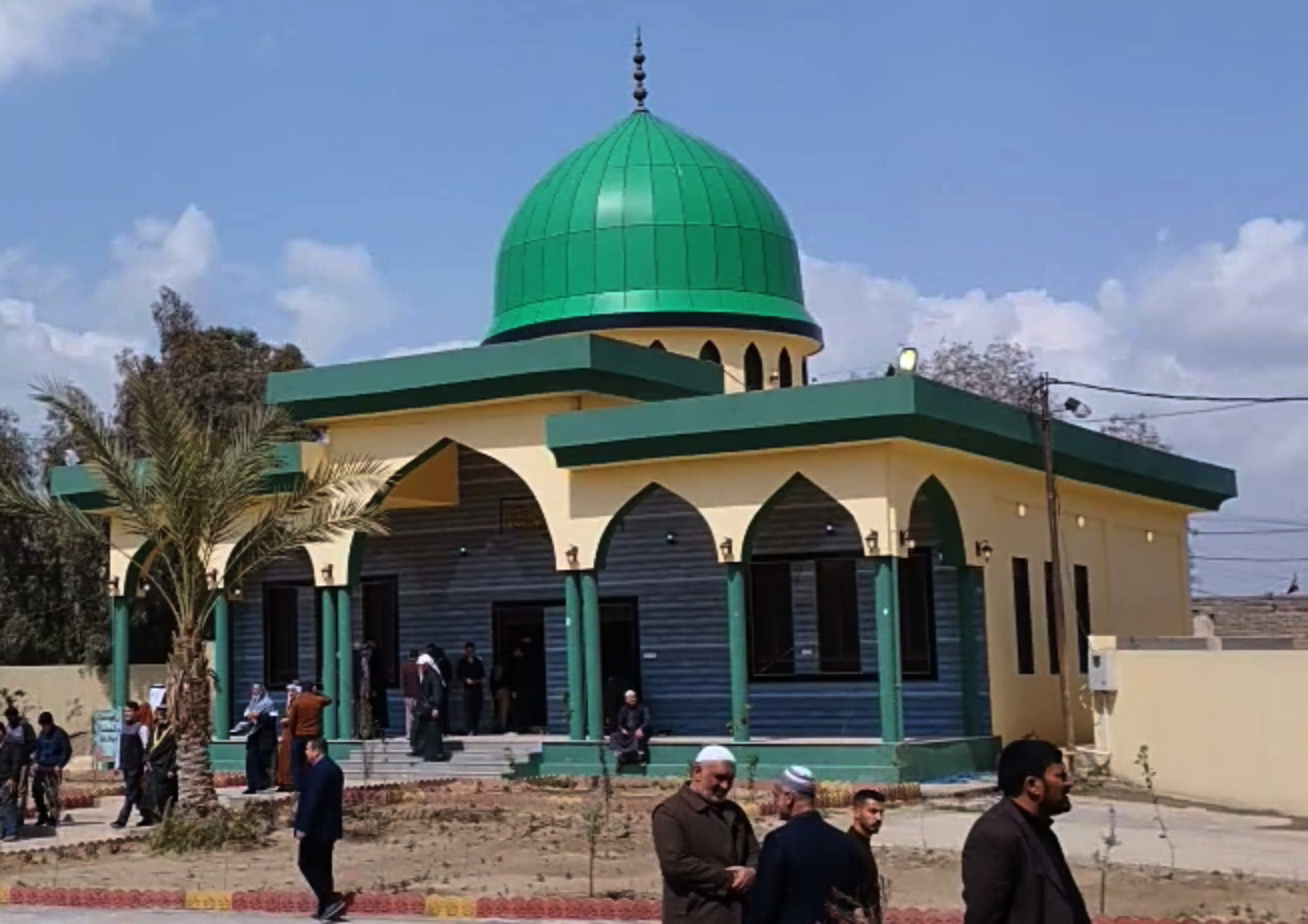
- The mausoleum and mosque after its 2022 reconstruction

- Location of the mosque and shrine in Iraq

Religion
- Affiliation: Islam
- Ecclesiastical or organizational status: Mosque and shrine
- Status: Active

Location
- Location: Mosul, Nineveh Governorate
- Country: Iraq
- Interactive map of Shrine of Shaykh Fathi al-Mawsili
- Coordinates: 36°20′47″N 43°07′04″E

Architecture
- Type: Islamic architecture
- Style: Seljuk; Ottoman; Modern Iraqi
- Founder: Syed Ghannem al-Dabbagh (mosque, 2001)
- Completed: 835 CE (mausoleum); 1760 (restoration); 2001 (mosque); 2022 (reconstruction)
- Destroyed: 2014 (by ISIL)

Specifications
- Domes: Two (since 2022); Three (2001–2014)
- Shrine: One: (Al-Fath al-Mawsili)

The Shrine of Shaykh Fathi al-Mawsili (Arabic: مرقد فتحي الموصلي) is a religious complex containing a mosque and shrine, located in Mosul, in the Nineveh Governorate of Iraq. The complex comprises a 21st-century mosque and a 9th-century mausoleum which entombs the remains of Al-Fath al-Mawsili, an ascetic and Hadith transmitter.

The mosque and mausoleum were razed in 2014 by the Islamic State of Iraq and the Levant. In 2022, a modern reconstruction of the two buildings was completed.

== History ==
The mausoleum was built in 835 CE over the grave of al-Fathi al-Mawsili, during the time of the Seljuks. It was restored many times including a complete rebuild in 1760 CE. In 2001, a new mosque was established next to the shrine by a wealthy businessman, Syed Ghannem al-Dabbagh. The shrine was also renovated in the same year.

In 2014, the Islamic State of Iraq and the Levant took over the city of Mosul, and ordered the demolition of the historic shrines in the city. Local residents protected the mausoleum, but the militants returned in the night and the mausoleum was destroyed with a bulldozer, and later the mosque was bulldozed as well.

Between 2021 and 2022, the mausoleum and the adjoining mosque were completely reconstructed in a Modern Iraqi style.

== Architecture ==
Between 835 and 2014 CE, the mausoleum of Shaykh Fathi consisted of a room with a staircase leading downwards to a basement. In the basement is the grave of Al-Fath al-Mawsili himself, and it is surmounted by a Seljuk-era ribbed dome. Several niches from the Seljuk era are also present in the shrine.

The prayer hall of the mosque consisted of quadrilateral columns with cubic capitals. There is a flat marble niche that is inscribed with verses from the Qur’an. The mosque was topped by a single circular dome.

Following its destruction in 2014, the mosque and mausoleum were rebuilt in 2022, and the new structures are of a similar shape. Each building is topped by a single, tall dome. The tomb of Shaykh Fathi is located under the dome of his mausoleum, where a cement tombstone over his grave is visible.

== See also ==
- Destruction of cultural heritage by the Islamic State
- List of mosques in Iraq
- List of Islamic structures in Mosul
- Islam in Iraq
