= Al-Imam Muhsin Mosque =

Mosque in Mosul, Iraq

- Arabic: جامع الإمام محسن
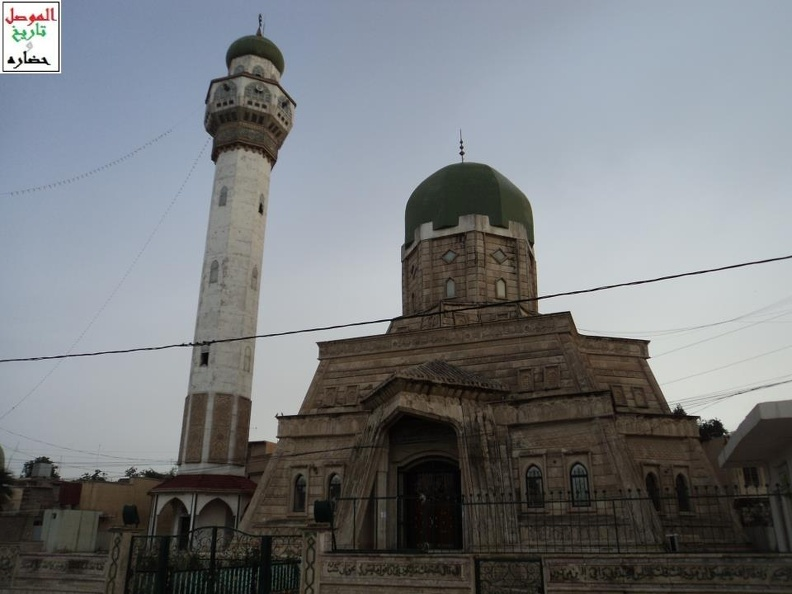
- The Al-Naqib Hall in front of the mosque

Religion
- Affiliation: Islam
- Ecclesiastical or organizational status: Mosque and mausoleum
- Status: Damaged, rest of mosque still intact

Location
- Location: Mosul, Iraq

Architecture
- Type: Great Seljuk architecture
- Founder: Nour ad-Din ibn Ezzadeen, later Badr Ad'Din Ibn Lu'lu
- Destroyed: 2017

Specifications
- Dome: 2
- Minaret: 2
- Shrine: 1

The Al-Imam Muhsin Mosque (Arabic: جامع الإمام محسن) is a historic mosque located in Mosul, Iraq. It is located in Al-Shifa' neighborhood, near the Bash Tapia Castle and in front of the Mausoleum of Yahya Abu al-Qasim. The mosque was initially built as a madrasa known as Madrasa al-Nouri, which was commissioned by the Seljuk ruler Nour ad-Din ibn Ezzadeen in the late 12th century. It became a mausoleum after refurbishment by the Zangid ruler Badr al-Din Lu'lu'. He turned one of the rooms into a shrine and mausoleum of Imam Muhsin, and added a musholla (prayer space) and a minbar.

The mausoleum was located in an underground shaft in a smaller mosque which was part of the complex. It was damaged by the Islamic State of Iraq and Levant in 2015 after an attempt to loot the mosque.

In 2017, Iraqi airstrikes mostly destroyed the Al-Imam Muhsin Mosque situated in the Dawrat Qassim al-Khayat area.

However, the mosque was repaired .

== See also ==
- Destruction of cultural heritage by the Islamic State
- Islam in Iraq
- List of mosques in Iraq
- List of Islamic structures in Mosul
