= Umayyad Mosque of Mosul =

Historic mosque in Mosul, Iraq

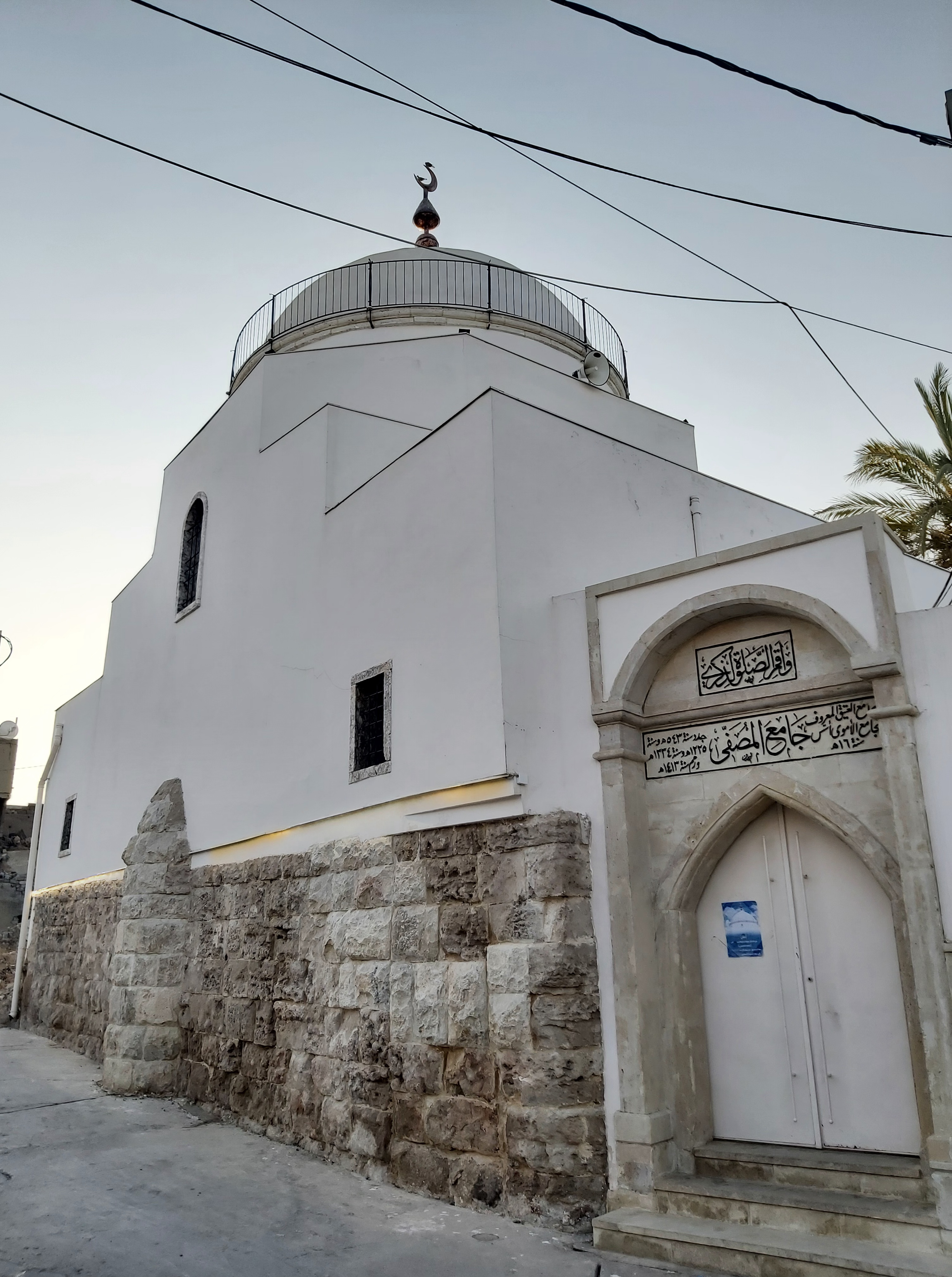
- View of the present-day al-Masfi Mosque on the site of the former Umayyad Mosque

Religion
- Affiliation: Sunni Islam
- Status: demolished (new mosque built on the site)

Location
- Location: Mosul, Iraq

Architecture
- Type: Mosque
- Style: Islamic
- Established: circa 641 CE
- Demolished: 1810 (al-Masfi Mosque built on same site)

The Umayyad Mosque of Mosul (Arabic: الجامع الأموي), also known as al-Atiq Mosque (Arabic: الجامع العتيق), was a large historic mosque in Mosul, Iraq, originally established in the 7th century. The mosque was demolished in 1810, after which the present-day al-Masfi Mosque (Arabic: جامع المُصَفِّي, romanized: Jāmiʿ al-Muṣaffī) was built on part of the site. The latter is also still known as the "Umayyad Mosque".

== History ==
Mosul was founded by early Arab Muslim conquerors circa 637 or 640–1 CE. According to medieval Arabic sources, Arfajah al-Bariki, who was placed in charge of the conquering Muslim force by Caliph Umar, established the town as a miṣr (military encampment) and built a congregational mosque within it. The town was further developed under the Umayyad caliph Marwan II (r. 744–750), to whom some sources also attributed the mosque's foundation.

The mosque was restored and enlarged multiple times until it occupied a large area, possibly measuring 110 metres (360 ft) from east to west. One major restoration was commissioned by Sayf al-Din Ghazi in 1148, at which time several madrasas and other religious establishments were added around it. After the foundation of a new congregational mosque, the al-Nuri Mosque, later that same century, the old "Umayyad Mosque" declined in importance and became neglected, though an important cemetery developed near it.

The Umayyad Mosque, in poor condition, was eventually demolished in 1810. The only piece of the building that is thought to have been preserved is a decorated mihrab inside the al-Nuri Mosque which was likely transferred to that building around the time of demolition. On the site of the former Umayyad Mosque, the smaller present-day al-Masfi Mosque was subsequently built, founded by Muhammad Muṣaffi al-Dhahab (Arabic: محمد مُصَفِّي الذهب). The mosque had a minaret known as the al-Kawāzīn minaret.

The al-Masfi Mosque was heavily damaged during the 2017 battle to expel ISIS from Mosul. The building was subsequently restored by Aliph, an international organisation dedicated to heritage conservation. It began hosting prayers again in 2021 and it was officially reopened in March 2024.

Al-Masfi Mosque (after 2024 restoration)

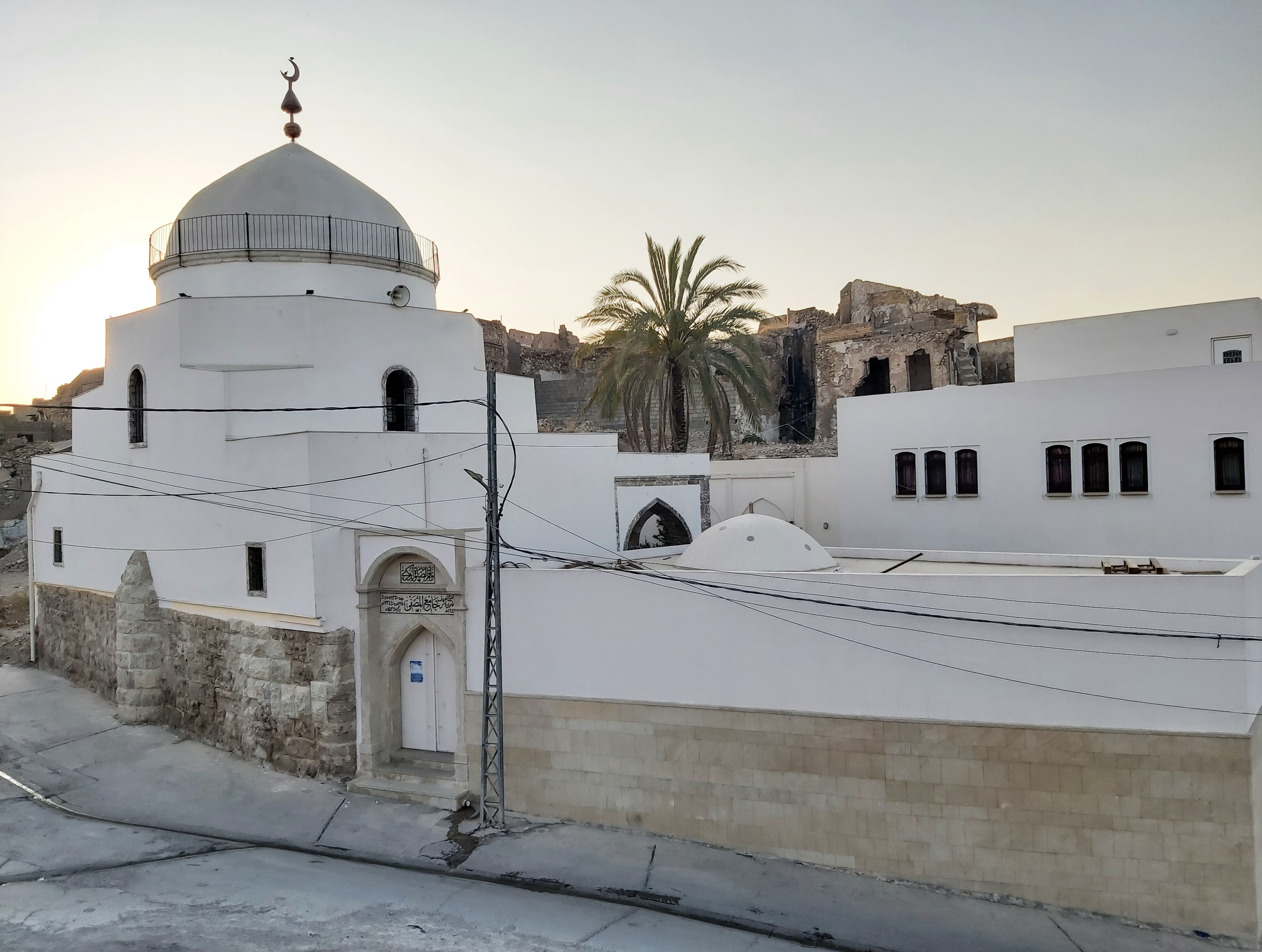
Exterior of the present-day al-Masfi Mosque

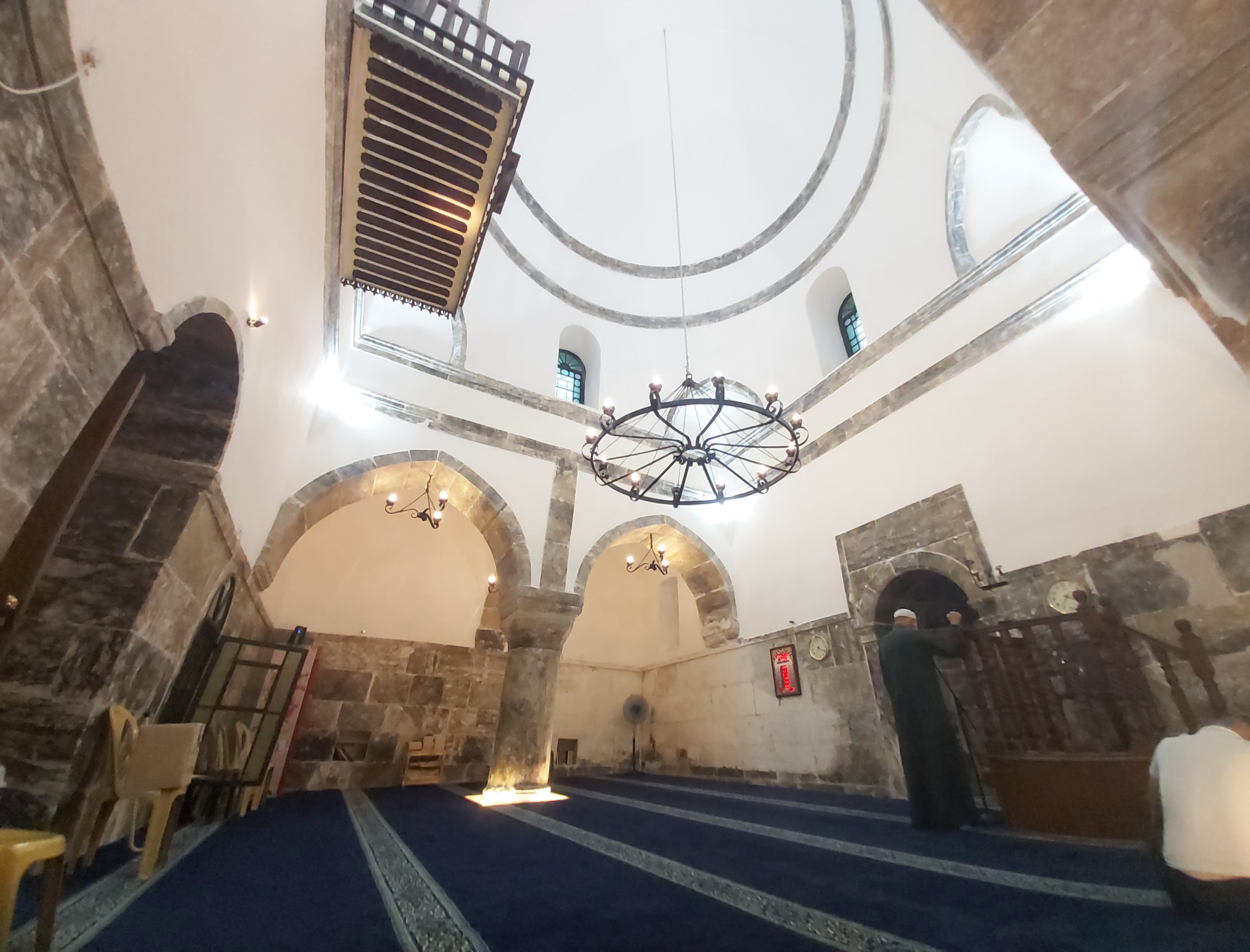
Interior of the al-Masfi Mosque
