= Hamu al-Qadu Mosque =

Mosque in Mosul, Iraq

- جامع حمو القدو
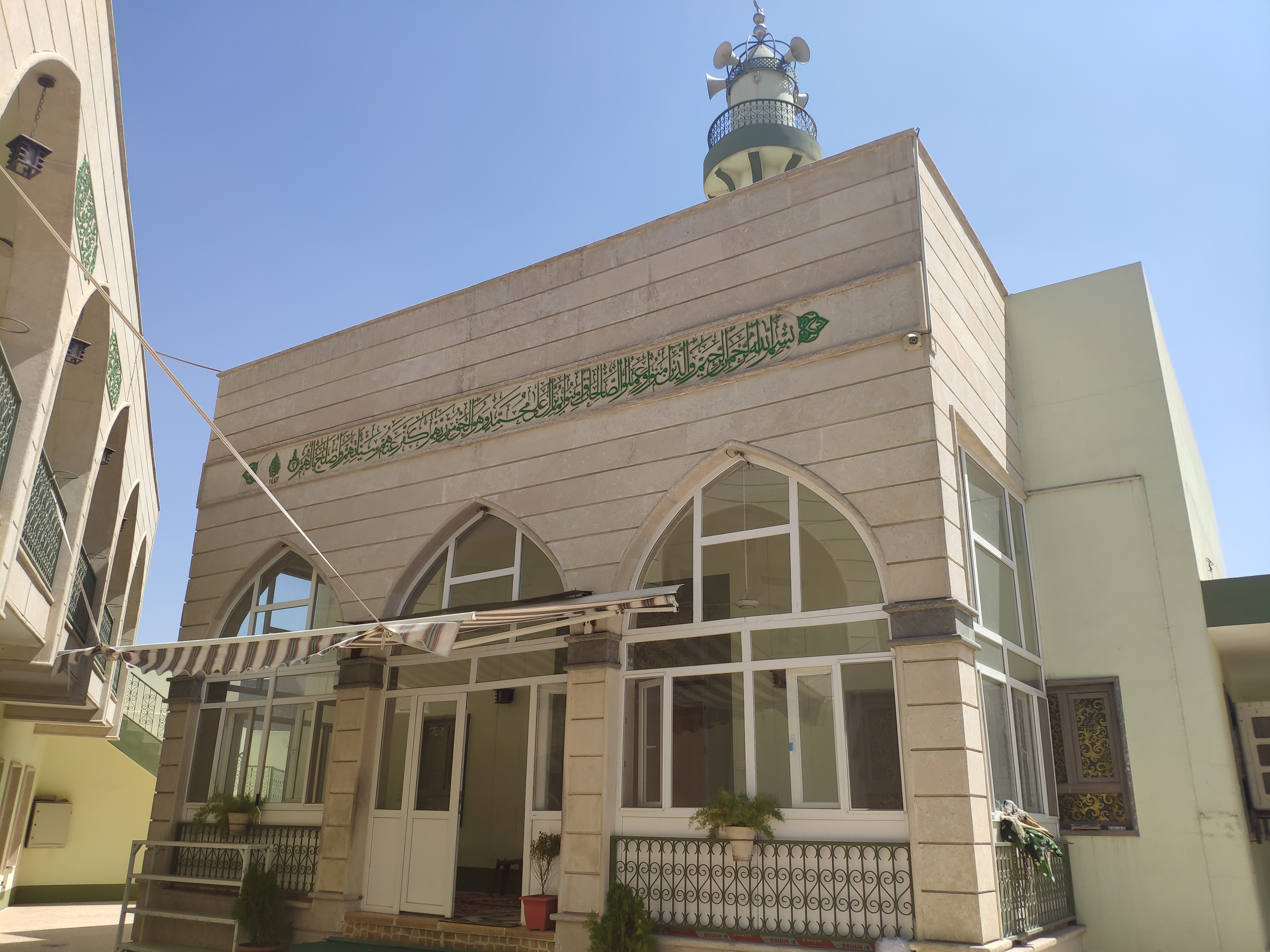
- The mosque in 2024, after its reconstruction

- Location of the mosque in Iraq

Religion
- Affiliation: Sunni Islam
- Ecclesiastical or organizational status: Mosque
- Status: Active (reconstructed)

Location
- Location: Mosul, Nineveh Governorate
- Country: Iraq
- Interactive map of Hamu al-Qadu Mosque
- Coordinates: 36°20′42.0″N 43°08′04.3″E

Architecture
- Type: Mosque architecture
- Style: Ottoman
- Founder: Hajji Abdullah Chalabi
- Completed: 1298 AH (1880/1881 CE); 2022 (reconstruction)
- Destroyed: March 2014 (by ISIL)

Specifications
- Dome: One
- Minaret: One
- Shrine: One: (Shaykh Ala' al-Din)
- Materials: Bricks

The Hamu al-Qadu Mosque (Arabic: جامع حمو القدو), also known as the Mosque of Hamu al-Qadu, is a mosque located in the city of Mosul, in the Nineveh Governorate of Iraq. Completed in 1298 AH (1880/1881 CE), during the Ottoman-era, the mosque contains a tomb of a local mystic, named Shaykh Ala' al-Din, whose tomb is located in the basement. The tomb was a location for ziyarat by locals every Thursday and Friday prior to its destruction in March 2014 by the Islamic State of Iraq and the Levant. The mosque was reconstructed in 2022.

== History ==
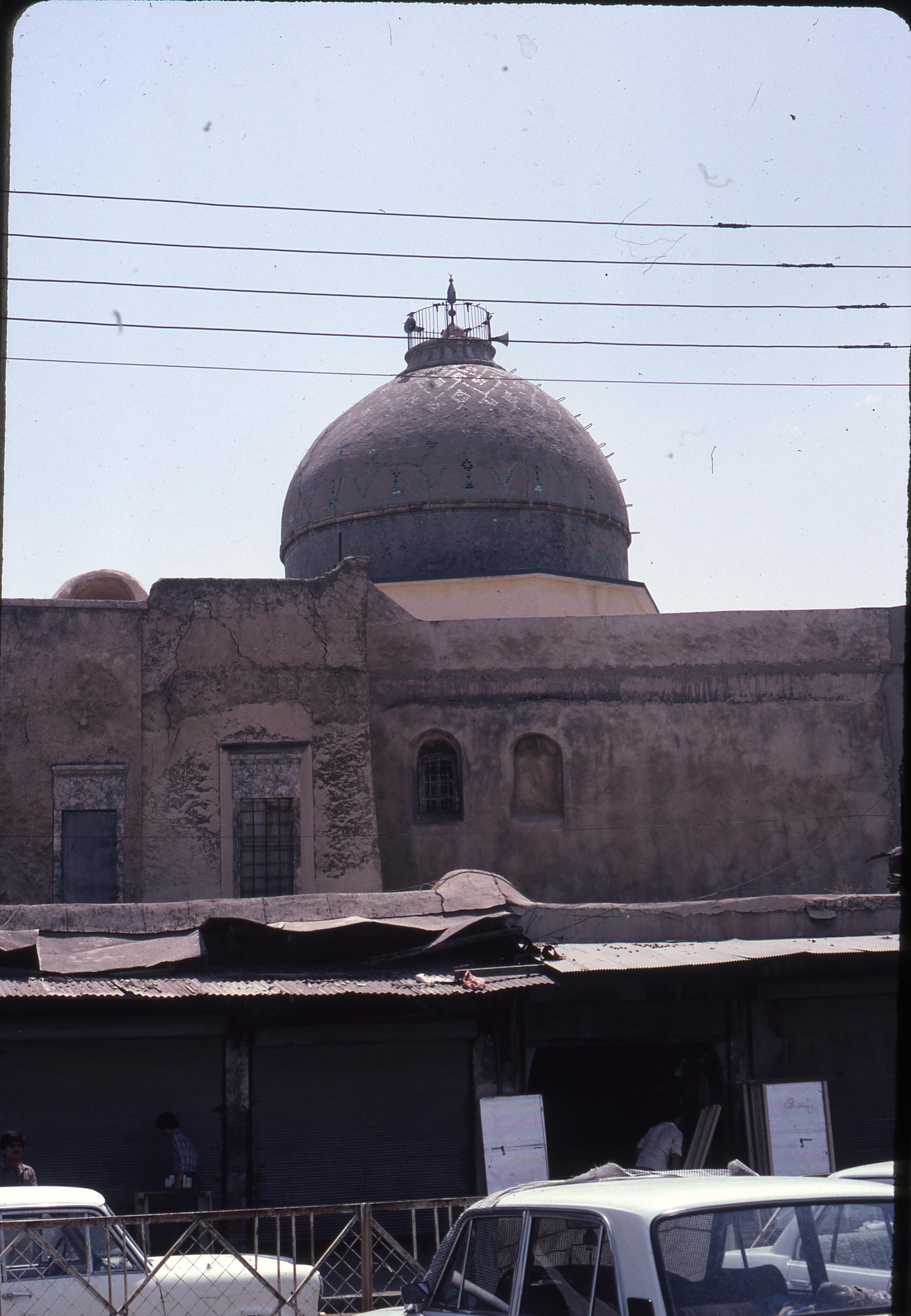
The mosque's dome-minaret in 1982 in its original form, the minaret has collapsed prior.

The mosque was established in 1880 by wealthy merchant who resided in Mosul named Hajji Abdullah Chalabi, who was nicknamed "Hamu al-Qadu" which became the mosque's name. Previously, he demolished a smaller mosque to build the new mosque on top of it, while preserving a basement that contained the tomb of a Muslim mystic named Shaykh Ala' al-Din. The Hajji would fund the construction of the mosque and establish a madrasa that taught religious and rational sciences.

The complex was located next to al-Maidan Souk of the city. The madrasa had a small library that had a total of 33 books that students could read from. The most distinguished part of the mosque became its minaret which was built on top of a decorated dome, which was built on top of a decorated arched dome.

In March 2014, the historic mosque was blown up by the Islamic State of Iraq and the Levant, because of the tomb in its basement.

The mosque was reconstructed during 2022.

== Features ==
The minaret was distinguished for being built directly on top of the dome. The dome of the mosque is double layered and made out of brick. A water fountain was also present at the entrance of the mosque. In the basement of the mosque is the tomb of Shaykh Ala' al-Din.

== See also ==
- Destruction of cultural heritage by the Islamic State
- Islam in Iraq
- List of Islamic structures in Mosul
- List of mosques in Iraq
