= Imam al-Baher Mosque =

Mosque in Mosul, Iraq

- جامع الامام الباهر
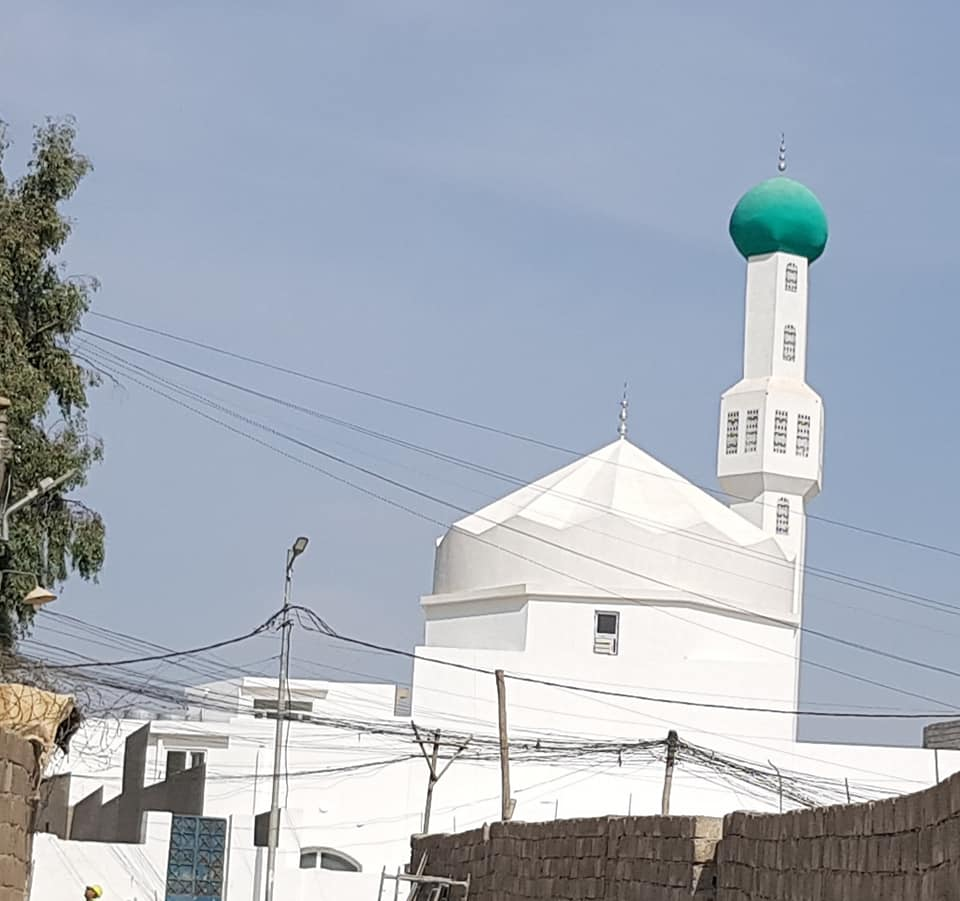
- The mosque in 2022, after its reconstruction

- Location of the mosque in Iraq

Religion
- Affiliation: Islam
- Ecclesiastical or organizational status: Mosque; Shrine (1259–2014)
- Status: Reconstructed mosque

Location
- Location: Mosul, Nineveh Governorate
- Country: Iraq
- Interactive map of Imam al-Baher Mosque
- Coordinates: 36°20′43″N 43°07′10″E

Architecture
- Type: Mosque architecture
- Style: Seljuk (1259 CE); Ottoman (1940 CE)
- Founder: Badr al-Din Lu'lu' (1259 CE)
- Completed: 699 AH (1299/1300 CE); 1940 CE (reconstructed); 2022 (reconstructed)
- Destroyed: 2014 (by ISIL)

Specifications
- Dome: One
- Dome height (outer): 17 m (56 ft)
- Minaret: One
- Shrines: One: (Imam al-Baher) (destroyed in 2014)

The Imam al-Baher Mosque (Arabic: جامع الامام الباهر, romanized: Jami' al-Imam al-Bahir) is a mosque and former shrine, located in the city of Mosul, in the Nineveh Governorate of Iraq. The mosque was commissioned by the Zangid ruler Badr al-Din Lu'lu' in 1259 CE and believed to be completed in 699 AH (1299/1300 CE). The building has been restored several times, the most recent reconstruction was in 2022, following its 2014 destruction by ISIL forces.

== History ==
The mosque contained the tomb of Imam al-Baher, a descendant of Imam Husayn, which was situated next to the prayer hall. The door to the shrine was made with blue marbles, and the ledges made of marble had the Throne Verse of the Qur'an inscribed on it. The tomb itself contained a wooden sarcophagus draped in cloth, believed to be the grave of the Sayyid himself.

The structure was rebuilt in 1940. The mihrab of the original building was removed to the National Museum of Iraq during the 1940s reconstruction. The mihrab takes the form of a pointed niche which the semidome is articulated with muqarnas. Framing the niche is an Arabic inscription band containing Qur'anic verses. The prayer hall was topped by a 17-metre-high (56 ft) dome and had a steel minaret.

In 2014, the mosque was destroyed by the Islamic State of Iraq and Levant by explosives.

The mosque was subsequently reconstructed during 2022.

== Gallery ==
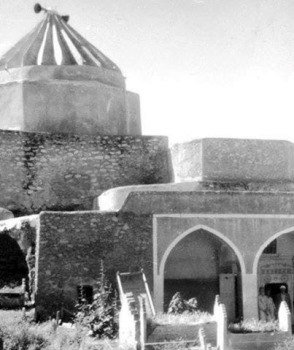
Undated photograph of the mosque, prior to 2014

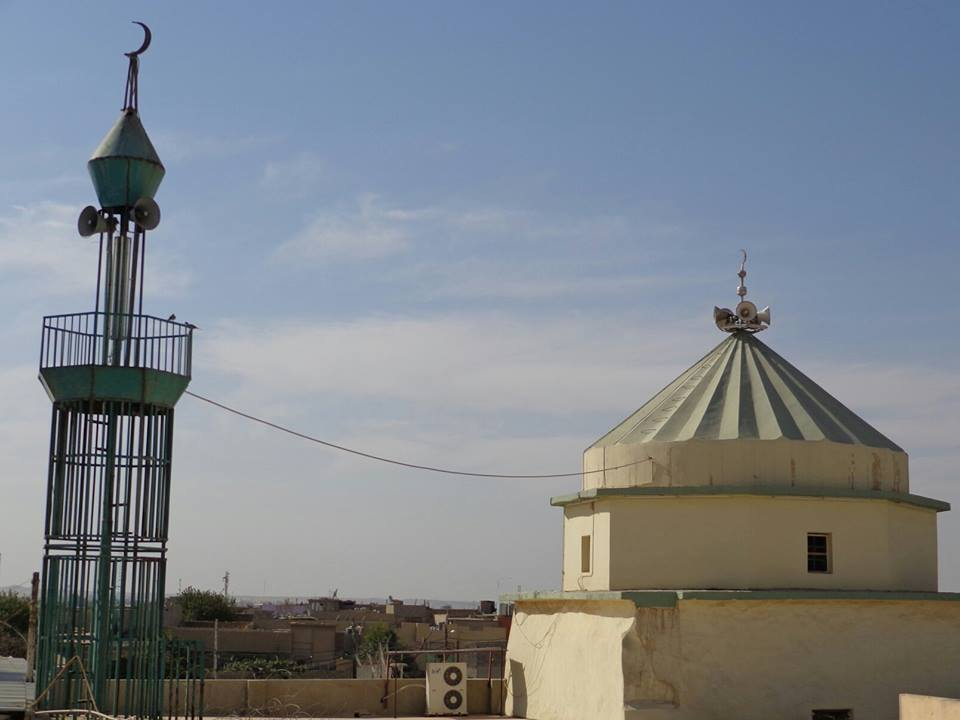
The mosque in 2007, prior to its destruction in 2014

== See also ==
- Destruction of cultural heritage by the Islamic State
- Islam in Iraq
- List of mosques in Iraq
- List of Islamic structures in Mosul
