= Al-Nabi Shith Mosque =

Destroyed mosque in Mosul, Iraq

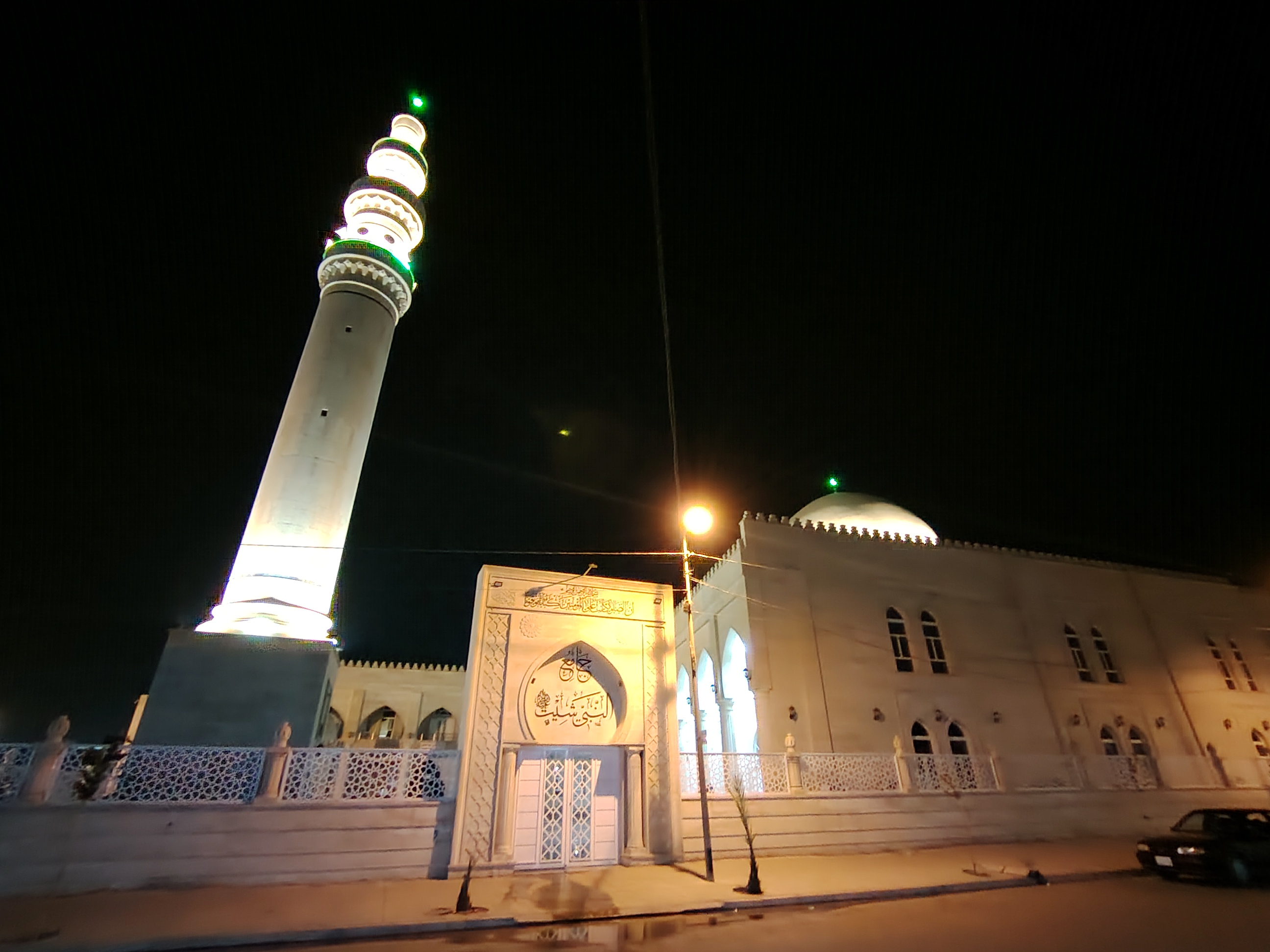
- The newly reconstructed Prophet Seth Mosque in 2024

- Location of the mosque in Iraq

Religion
- Affiliation: Islam
- Ecclesiastical or organisational status: Mosque and shrine
- Status: Destroyed (pending reconstruction)

Location
- Location: Mosul
- Country: Iraq
- Coordinates: 36°19′51″N 43°8′0″E

Architecture
- Type: Mosque architecture
- Style: Islamic
- Founder: Ahmad Basha ibn Suleyman Basha al-Jalili
- Completed: 17th century (tomb); 1815 (substantive structure); 1977 (major renovations)
- Destroyed: 2014

Specifications
- Dome: Two
- Minaret: One
- Shrine: One

Al-Nabi Shith Mosque (Arabic: جامع النبي شيت, romanized: Mosque of the Prophet Seth) is a historic Ottoman period mosque and shrine in Mosul, Iraq. Located south of the city, it's one of the larger mosques in the city and is believed to contain the burial site of the Biblical figure Seth, son of Adam, who's also venerated by Muslims as a prophet.

The mosque gained attention when the terrorist group, ISIL, destroyed the mosque using explosives and then transformed it into a parking lot. As well as looting its equipment. This attack, as well as attack on other heritage sites in Mosul such as the Mosque of the Prophet Jonah, were seen as attacks on Iraq's shared historical heritage and identity. After ISIL's defeat, the mosque was rebuilt.

== Historical background ==
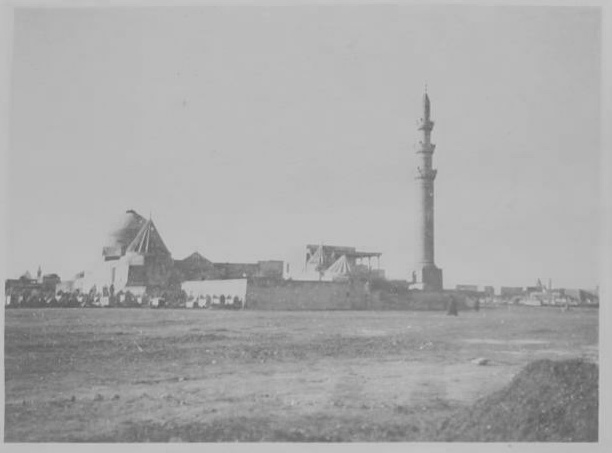
A view of the mosque around the late 1910s.

Prior to the founding of this mosque, the burial site of the Biblical Seth wasn't known. In 1647 CE, Mustafa Pasha al-Nishanji became governor of Mosul. The Pasha was renowned for his piety and asceticism. Afterwards, he had a dream in which Seth appeared to him and showed him his grave. He then ordered a merchant from Mosul, Hajj Ali ibn al-Nawma, to excavate the spot he had seen in the dream. Al-Nawma dug up the grave and built a structure with a dome over it. This structure became known as the Shrine of the Prophet Seth. He placed a sarcophagus and a curtain over it, and the family of al-Nawma became responsible for its custodianship.

In 1791 CE, a mosque was built next to it, where the five daily prayers were performed. It became known as the Mosque of the Prophet Seth. He endowed the mosque with a bazaar and several gates. The mosque had three gates: the eastern gate, the western gate, and the northern gate. At the front of the eastern gate's archway was a public fountain named the Dar al-Sabil.

The site originated as a modest 17th-century tomb of the prophet, Seth, and a small mosque was added during the 18th century Ottoman period. In 1815, Ahmad Basha ibn Suleyman Pasha al-Jalili replaced both structures with a large congregational mosque, a mausoleum of the prophet, a madrasa, and his own tomb. In 1977, the entire complex, with the exception of the minaret, was demolished and a new concrete mosque was erected at its place. The new minaret was built after 1983.

== Library ==
Alongside its tomb, the mosque was renowned for having a library and two madrasas. Sulayman Pasha had established two madrasas, one for teaching Islamic sciences and the other for reading. The library contained 33 copies of the Qur'an, 131 books, and 236 manuscripts in the late Ottoman period and 10 scribes. Languages included Arabic, Ottoman Turkish, and Persian. The Pasha built 14 rooms for the two madrasas and allocated funds for it. By 1900, the small educational institution had 29 students and its head-teacher was Sheikh Abd al-Ghafur bin Hasan al-Habbar.

== Present day ==
=== 2014 demolition ===
On 24 July 2014, the Islamic State of Iraq and the Levant detonated explosives inside the Nabi Shith Mosque, destroying it completely. The militants had also allegedly removed artifacts from the shrine and took them to an unknown location.

=== 2022 reconstruction ===
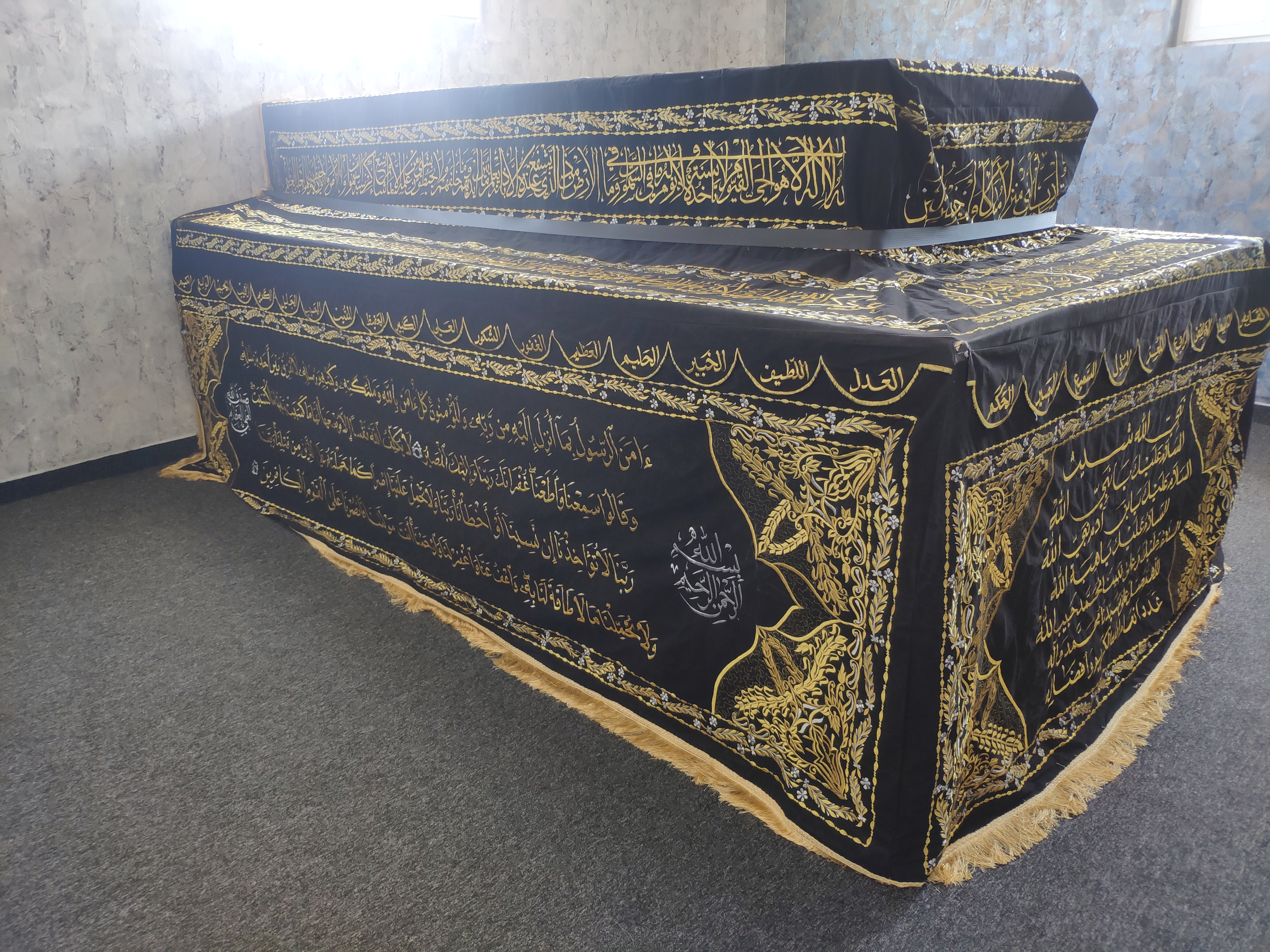
The current tomb of Seth inside the mosque in 2025

The mosque was rebuilt by the Charitable Deeds Association, under the supervision of Ahmed al-Umari, with primary funding from Hajj Idris Abd al-Qadir Khattab and his sons, and Hajj Abd al-Jawad Abd al-Qadir al-Jalabi and his sons, in addition to contributions from Dr. Abd al-Salam al-Qassab and others. Mass Cement Company donated most of the necessary cement.

The reconstruction included equipping the mosque with a complete sound system and a television system to broadcast the Friday sermon to the women's prayer area. A memorial was also erected using stones from the old mosque inscribed with Qur'anic verses, to document the events that befell the mosque. This memorial was placed near the staircase leading to the upper floor and is surrounded by a Qur'anic verse. To commemorate this occasion, the poet Dr. Walid al-Sarraf wrote a poem that chronicled the event and was inscribed on one of the walls of the exit gate.

== See also ==
- Destruction of cultural heritage by the Islamic State
- List of Islamic structures in Mosul
- List of mosques in Iraq
