= Nizamiyya =

Historical theological schools in Iran

A Nizamiyya (Note: Less commonly spelled Nezamiyeh (via modern Iranian Persian: نظامیه Neẓâmiye) or Nizamiye (via Turkish).) (Classical Persian: نظامیه Niẓāmiyya, from Arabic نظامية Niẓāmiyya, short for مدرسة نظامية madrasa Niẓāmiyya, lit. 'Nizamian school') (Note: Also translated in older English-language works as 'Nizamian college'.) was a type of institution of higher education established by Nizam al-Mulk in the 11th century across regions of the Seljuk Empire. The word Nizamiyya derives from Nizam al-Mulk's name. These Sunni theological schools are considered to have been models for later Islamic universities, or schools.

The Nizamiyyas were among the first well-organized institutions of higher learning in the world. The quality of education was among the highest in the Islamic world, and they were even renowned in Europe. They were supported financially, politically, and spiritually by the royal establishment and the elite class. Some scholars have suggested that the establishment of the Nizamiyyas was in fact an attempt to thwart the growing influence of another group of Muslims, the Ismailis, in the region. Indeed, Nizam al-Mulk devoted a significant section in his famous Siyasatnama (Books of Politics) to refuting the Ismaili doctrines. (Note: Nizam al-Mulk was finally assassinated en route from Isfahan to Baghdad in 1092 CE, by a Nizari Ismaili (an Assassin) according to several books. Muqatil ibn Atiyah, a staff member of the Nizamiyya of Baghdad and son-in-law of Nizam al-Mulk, alleged that Nizam al-Mulk converted to Shi'ism after a Sunni-Shia debate held on the orders of Sultan Malik Shah I, who also converted to Shi'ism. But it is thereafter that they were both assassinated. The book has been subjected to scholarly criticism by some academic researchers, as historical sources do not mention or refer to this conference, and the Seljuk Sultan and his minister were among the most fanatical Sunnis. This contradicts what this book presents, making it, in the researcher's view, a work of popular fiction.)

The most celebrated Nizamiyya was the Nizamiyya of Baghdad (established 1065), where Nizam al-Mulk appointed the distinguished philosopher and theologian, al-Ghazali, as a professor. Persian poet Sa'di was a student of the Baghdad Nizamiyya. Other Nizamiyyas were located in Nishapur, Amol, Balkh, Herat and Isfahan. There was also an outlet in Mosul, which was renovated in 1330 by the Jalayirids.

The curriculum initially focused on religious studies, Islamic law, Arabic literature, and arithmetic, and later extended to history, mathematics, the physical sciences, and music.

== See also ==
- Nizamiyya of Baghdad
- Islamic Golden Age
- Madrasa
- List of Islamic seminaries

Education

- Academy of Gondishapur
- Dar al-Fonun
- Higher education in Iran
- House of Wisdom, another establishment in Baghdad
- Modern Iranian scientists and engineers
- Sarouyeh
- School of Nisibis
- List of Iranian Research Centers
- List of Iranian scientists from the pre-modern era
- List of universities in Iran
