= Great Mosque of al-Nuri, Mosul =

Mosque in Mosul, Iraq

Great Mosque of al-Nuri
- جامع النوري
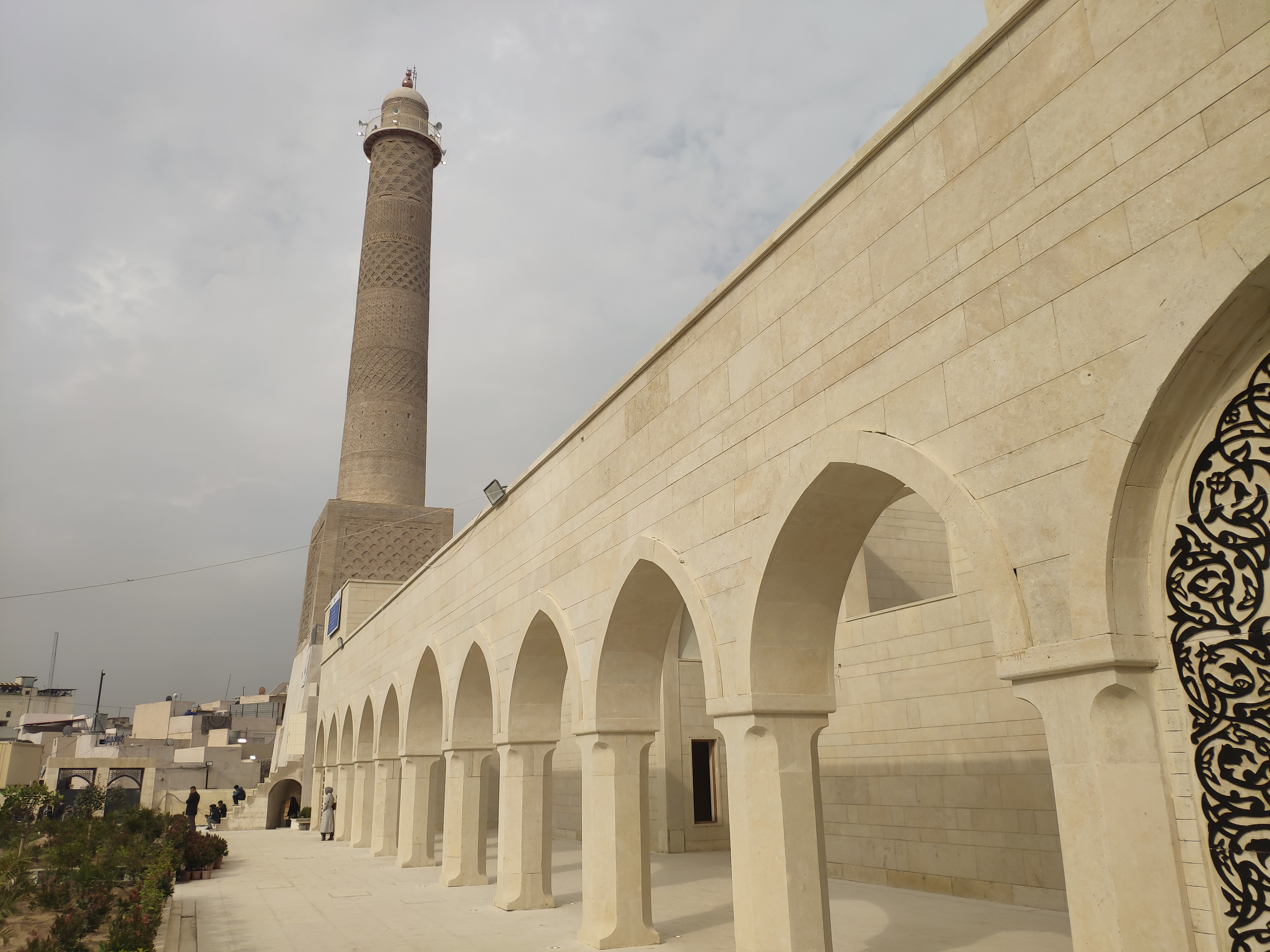
- The mosque in 2025

Religion
- Affiliation: Sunni Islam
- Ecclesiastical or organisational status: Mosque
- Status: Active

Location
- Location: Mosul, Nineveh Governorate
- Country: Iraq
- Interactive map of Great Mosque of al-Nuri
- Coordinates: 36°20′35″N 43°7′36″E

Architecture
- Style: Islamic architecture
- Founder: Nur ad-Din Zangi
- Completed: 1173 (original); 2024 (reconstruction)

Specifications
- Minaret: 1
- Minaret height: 45 m (148 ft) (reconstruction)
- Shrine: 1
- Materials: Brick, stone, tile

The Great Mosque of al-Nuri (Arabic: جامع النوري, romanized: Jāmiʿ an-Nūrī), also known as the Nouri Mosque, is a Sunni mosque in Mosul, in the Nineveh Governorate of Iraq, famous for its leaning minaret, which gave the city its nickname "the hunchback" (Arabic: الحدباء, romanized: al-Ḥadbāˈ). Tradition holds that the mosque was built in the late 12th century, although it underwent many renovations over the years. The mosque withstood various hostile invading forces over its 850-year history until it was destroyed, along with its distinctive minaret, in the 2017 Battle of Mosul.

Iraqi troops attributed the destruction of the mosque to the Islamic State of Iraq and the Levant in a vandalistic move to destroy it rather than let it go from their hold. The mosque had held a symbolic importance to ISIL and its leader, Abu Bakr al-Baghdadi, as it was used in 2014 by the militants to self-declare their "caliphate". ISIL's black flag had been flying on the 45-metre-high (148 ft) minaret after their militants surged across Iraq and Syria seizing territory, and they had promised to never let their flag be lowered from it. Contrary to official accounts and local eyewitnesses, IS alleged that U.S. forces destroyed it. ISIL's claim was not substantiated. BBC News reported that "IS accused the United States-led coalition aircraft of bombing the site, but experts said a video circulated online appeared to show charges inside the structures exploding."

Iraqi Prime Minister Haider al-Abadi stated that the destruction of the mosque by ISIL was a "declaration of defeat", and that "[b]lowing up the al-Hadba minaret and the al-Nuri mosque amounts to an official acknowledgment of defeat [by ISIS]."

The mosque was reconstructed with significant funding from UNESCO and the United Arab Emirates and reopened in 2024.

== Construction ==
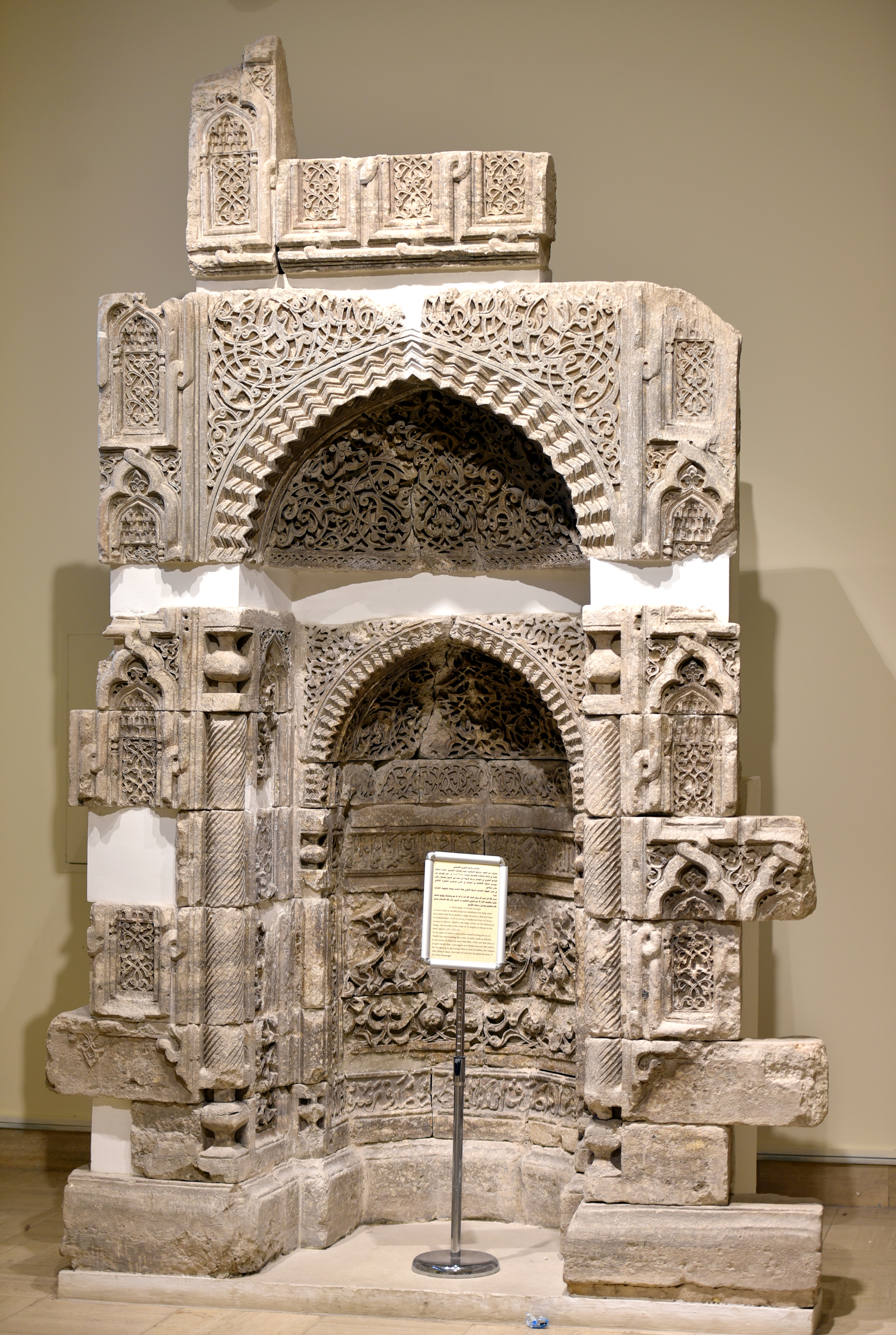
Mihrab from al-Nuri Mosque in Mosul, Iraq, built by Nur al-Din Zengi, 6th century AH, Iraq Museum

Tradition holds that Nur ad-Din Zangi, a Turkoman atabeg of the Zengid dynasty and sultan of its Syrian province, built the mosque in 1172–1173, shortly before his death. According to the chronicle of Ibn al-Athir, after Nur ad-Din took control of Mosul he ordered his nephew Fakhr al-Din to build the mosque:

[Nur ad-Din] rode in person to its site and viewed it. He climbed the minaret of the mosque of Abu Hajir, looked down on the site of his mosque and ordered that the neighboring houses and shops should be added to the land that he viewed but that nothing should be taken without the willing agreement of the owners. He put the local Sheikh Umar al-Malla in charge of the project, a pious and good man. The properties were purchased from their owners at most substantial prices and the construction began, on which large sums were expended. The building was completed in the year 568 [i.e. AD 1172-3].

== Minaret ==
The mosque was well known for its leaning minaret, known as al-Hadba’ ("the hunchback"). Grattan Geary, a 19th-century traveler, described the minaret's appearance:

It is several feet out of the perpendicular, though it starts fair from the ground, and at the top, before putting on its gallery and dome, it regains an erect posture. Its attitude is that of a man bowing.

When the cylindrical minaret was built it stood 45 metres (148 ft) high, with seven bands of decorative brickwork in complex geometric patterns ascending in levels towards the top. By the time the traveler Ibn Battuta visited in the 14th century it was already listing and had acquired its nickname. The design of the minaret follows a form originally developed in neighboring Iran and Central Asia and shares similarities with other minarets in northern Iraq, such as those in Mardin, Sinjar and Arbil. It is depicted on Iraq's 10,000 dinar note.

According to local tradition (which ignores chronology), the minaret gained its tilt after the Islamic prophet Muhammad passed overhead while ascending to heaven. The minaret bowed itself in reverence but could only regain its balance after its top joint had been kinked in the opposite direction. According to local Christian tradition, however, the mosque's tilt was due to its bowing towards the tomb of the Virgin Mary, reputedly located near Arbil. It is also nicknamed by some as Iraq's "Tower of Pisa", as the mosque's signature tilt was compared to that of the Torre di Pisa in Italy.

== Madrasa ==
The madrasa located northwest of the mosque was built by Nizam al-Mulk in the 11th century, as part of the Nizamiyya series of Islamic schools. It was converted into a shrine for a patron saint, Ali al-Asghar, in the 12th century during the Zengid period and later renovated in 1330 by the Jalayirids. Later traditions ascribed the shrine to an unspecified Shaykh al-Nuri during the Timurid period.

== Modern history ==
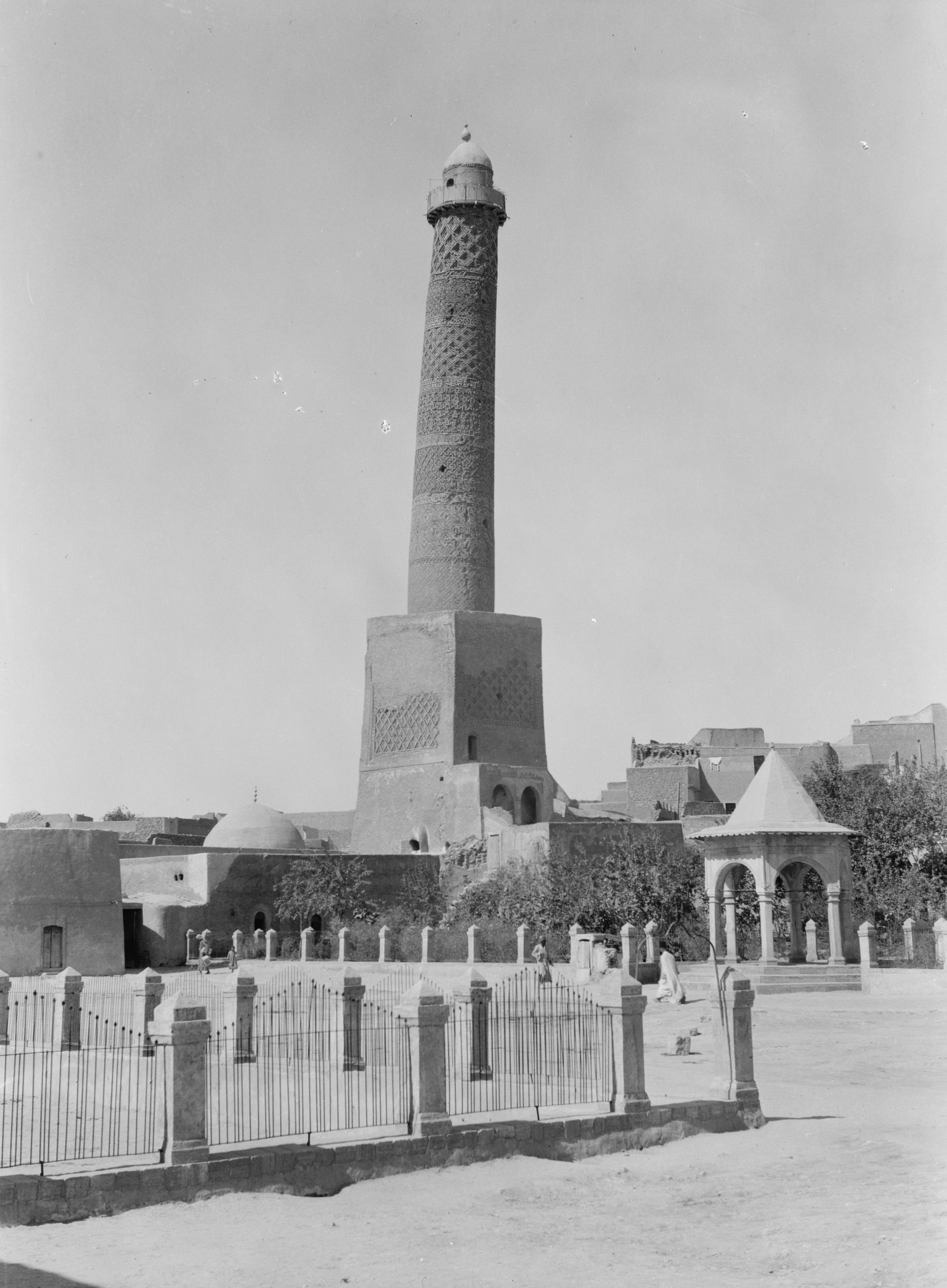
The leaning minaret of the mosque as of the Kingdom of Iraq period in 1932.

The mosque, its madrasah, and its tomb were dismantled and reassembled in 1942 in a restoration programme undertaken by the Iraqi government. The minaret remained unrestored, although attempts were made in 1981 by an Italian firm to stabilize it. The bombing of Mosul during the Iran–Iraq War in the 1980s broke underground pipes and caused leaks under the minaret that further undermined it. The lean later worsened by another 40 centimetres (16 in).

The cause of the lean was disputed – some have blamed the prevailing wind – but local officials have attributed it to the effects of thermal expansion caused by the heat of the sun, causing bricks on the sun-facing side to expand and progressively tilt the minaret. In recent years, cracks proliferated along the base of the minaret, which leant nearly 3 metres (9.8 ft) off vertical. It was listed by the World Monuments Fund as a site of concern due to the ongoing risk of collapse.

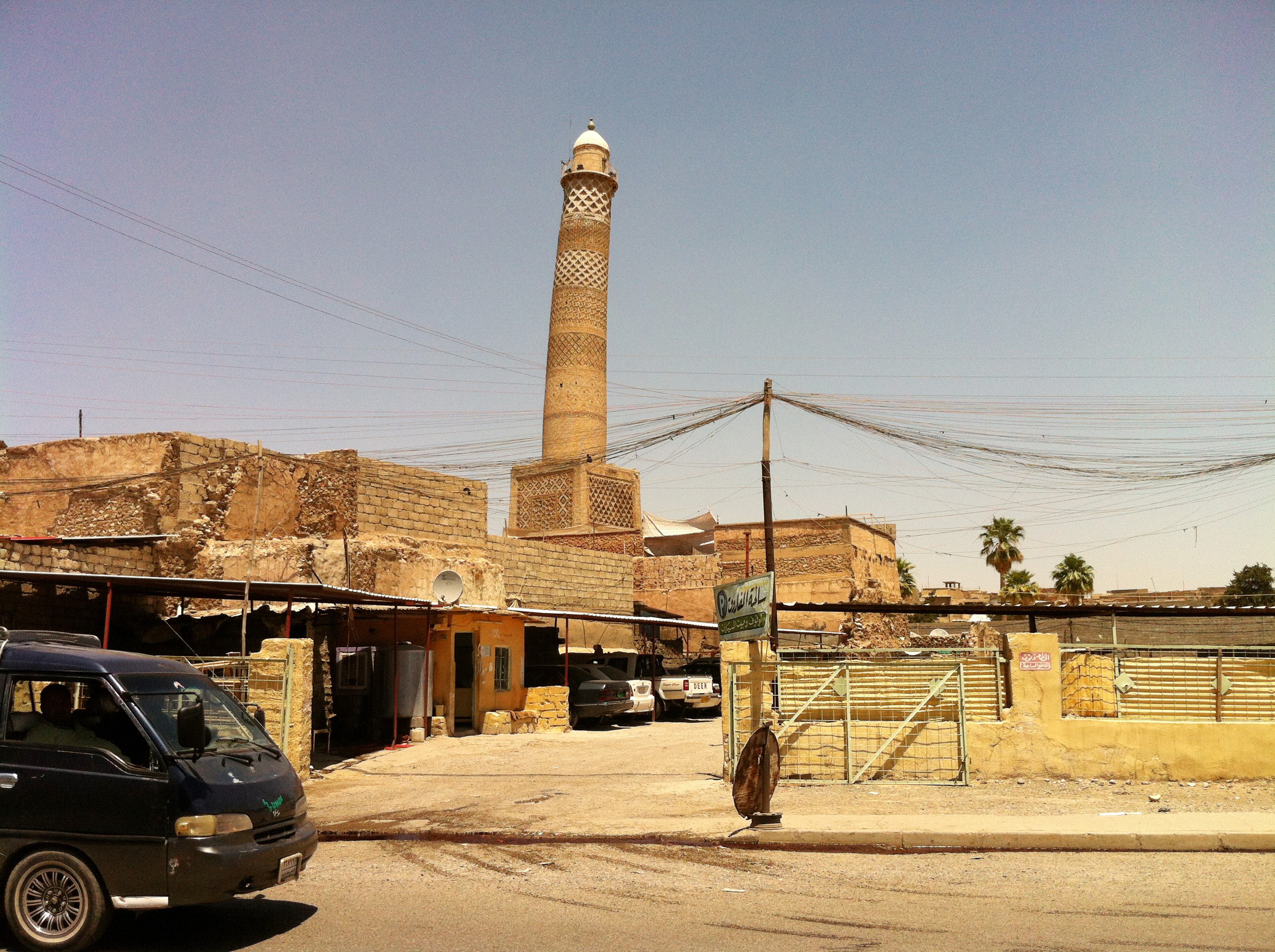
The al-Hadba minaret in 2013.

The structure was targeted by Islamic State of Iraq and the Levant militants who occupied Mosul on 10 June 2014, and had previously destroyed the Tomb of Yunus. However, residents of Mosul, incensed with the destruction of their cultural sites, protected the mosque by forming a human chain and forming a resistance against ISIL. Rather than destroying the site, Abu Bakr al-Baghdadi appeared during a Friday prayer in this mosque on 4 July 2014 to declare the formation of a new caliphate.

=== Destruction ===
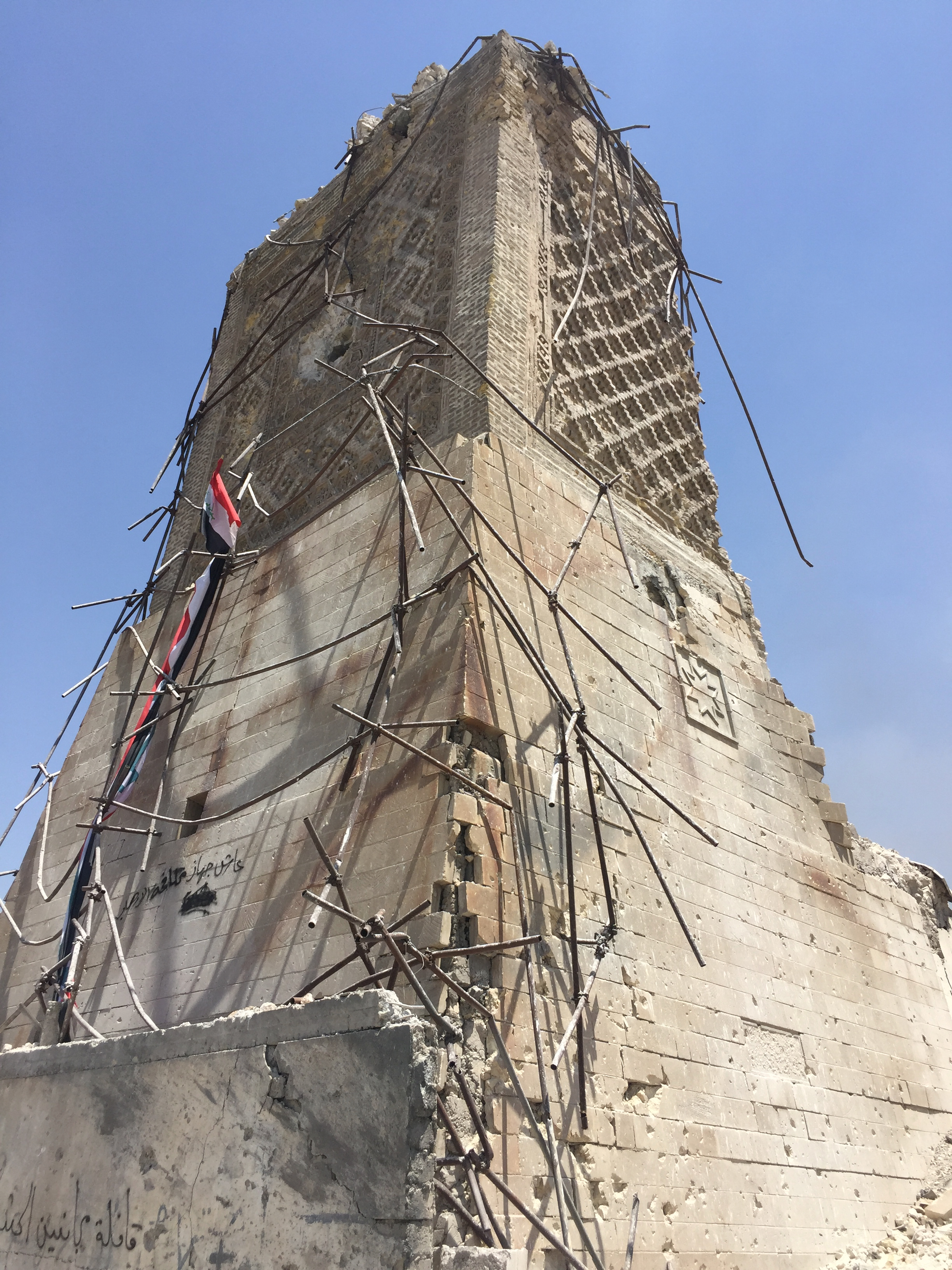
Minaret base of the Great Mosque of al-Nuri after its destruction in 2017

By June 2017, the Battle of Mosul had progressed to the stage that IS-controlled territory in Mosul was limited to the Old City area, which included the mosque. On 21 June 2017, Iraqi government forces reported that the mosque had been blown up by IS forces at 9:50 PM and that the blast was indicative of bombs being deliberately placed to bring it down.

Amaq, an information wing of IS that often reports news favorable to the terrorist organization, claimed an airstrike by the United States was responsible for the destruction, but this claim was not substantiated by any evidence.

Iraqi forces were within 50 metres (160 ft) of the mosque before the explosion, and finally captured the site a week later on 29 June. Aerial photographs and a video of the destruction were released by the Iraqi military a few hours after the explosion. The video, particularly, clearly showed charges inside the structure exploding.

Iraqi Prime Minister Haider al-Abadi stated that the destruction of the mosque was IS's "declaration of defeat". BBC News journalist Paul Adams interpreted the mosque's destruction as ISIL's "final act of angry defiance before finally losing their grip on Mosul".

=== Reconstruction ===
On 23 April 2018, United Arab Emirates (UAE) pledged to reconstruct the mosque. The UAE provided US$50.4 million to fund the reconstruction project with a joint collaboration between the UAE, UNESCO, Iraq's culture ministry, and the International Centre for the Study of the Preservation and Restoration of Cultural Property (ICCROM). The project plan is the preservation of the square base of the leaning minaret as a memorial to the victims of ISIS as well as the construction of a replica which would be visible in the Mosul skyline. During the announcement, the UAE minister of Culture and Knowledge Development Noura Al Kaabi spoke at the Chatham House in central London and stated that "This is an initiative that defeats extremism in all its facets" and "[w]e don't want to allow the destruction of the past and the present". She hosted the first meeting of the joint committee in September 2018 in the UAE. The expected completion date of the planned reconstruction is in 2023. A foundation stone for the reconstruction was laid on 17 December 2018.

In April 2021, it was announced that a group of eight Egyptian architects won a competition to reconstruct the mosque, from among 123 entries. The winning entry was criticized as resembling architecture found in Gulf Arab states more than traditional architecture in Mosul.

On 13 November 2024, at approximately 10:30am, construction workers fitted a pole with an Iraqi flag on top of the minaret marking the end of the reconstruction process. The mosque has reopened for worship and an official opening was held on 1 September 2025 in a ceremony attended by Iraqi prime minister Mohammed Shia al-Sudani.

== See also ==
- Destruction of cultural heritage by the Islamic State
- Islam in Iraq
- List of mosques in Iraq
- List of Islamic structures in Mosul
