= Al-Fath al-Mawsili =

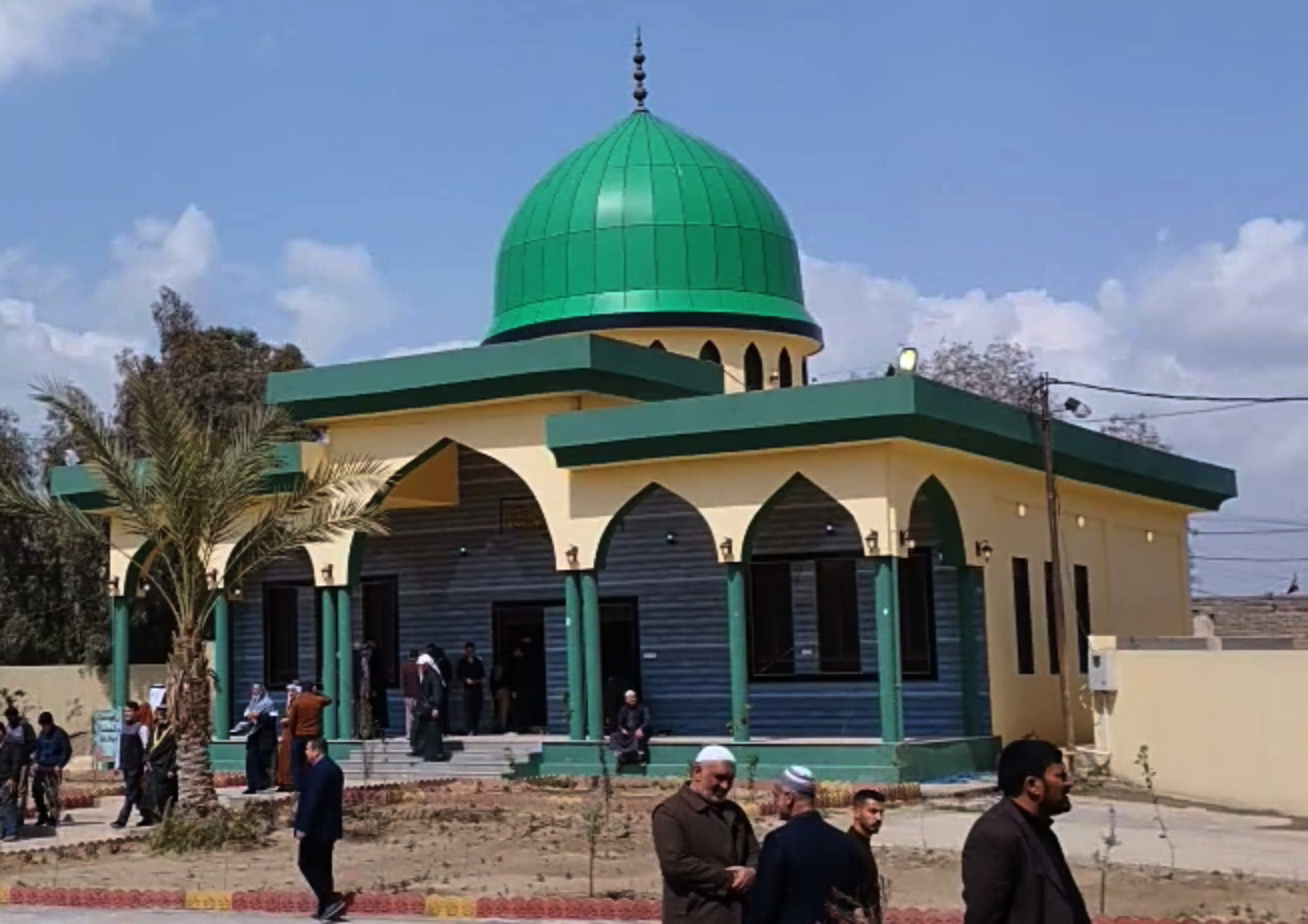
- The reconstructed mausoleum of Al-Fath al-Mawsili in Mosul
- Died: 835
- Venerated in: Islam
- Major shrine: Buried in Shrine of Shaykh Fathi al-Mawsili, Mosul, Iraq
- Catholic cult suppressed: by Islamic State of Iraq and the Levant
- Influenced: Bishr ibn al-Harith

Abu Naṣr Abu Muḥammad ibn Saʿīd (Arabic: أبو نصر أبو محمد بن سعيد), also known as Shaykh Fathi or Al-Fatḥ al-Mawṣilī, was one of the early Muslim Sufi saints. He was born in the Kar district of Mosul, hence he had the epithet Al-Mawsili.

He was a notable Hadith scholar as well as an ascetic. Al-Fath al-Mawsili was also a companion of the fellow scholarly ascetic, Bishr ibn al-Harith. He died in 835 and was buried in his hometown, where a shrine was built over his grave.
