= Bayraktar =

Bayraktar may refer to:

- Bayraktar (surname)
- Bayraktar, Bayburt, a village in Turkey
- Bayraktar UAV, a brand of Turkish drone
  - Bayraktar (song), Ukraine, 2022, about the UAV in the Russian invasion
- Bayraktar-class tank landing ship, Turkish Navy
- Bajraktar, Ottoman-era standard-bearer esp. in Albanian tribes

== See also ==
- Alemdar
