= Mosul =

City in Nineveh Governorate, Iraq

Mosul الموصل
- Metropolis
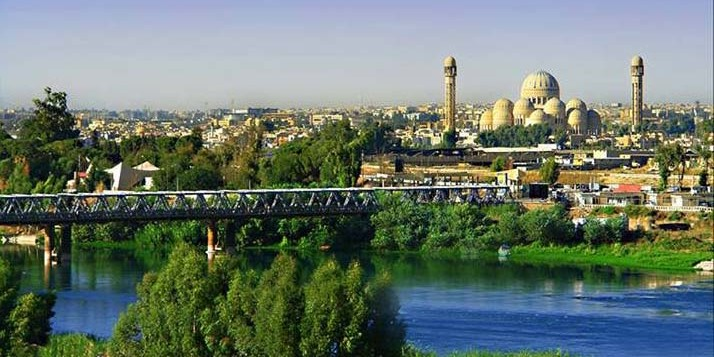
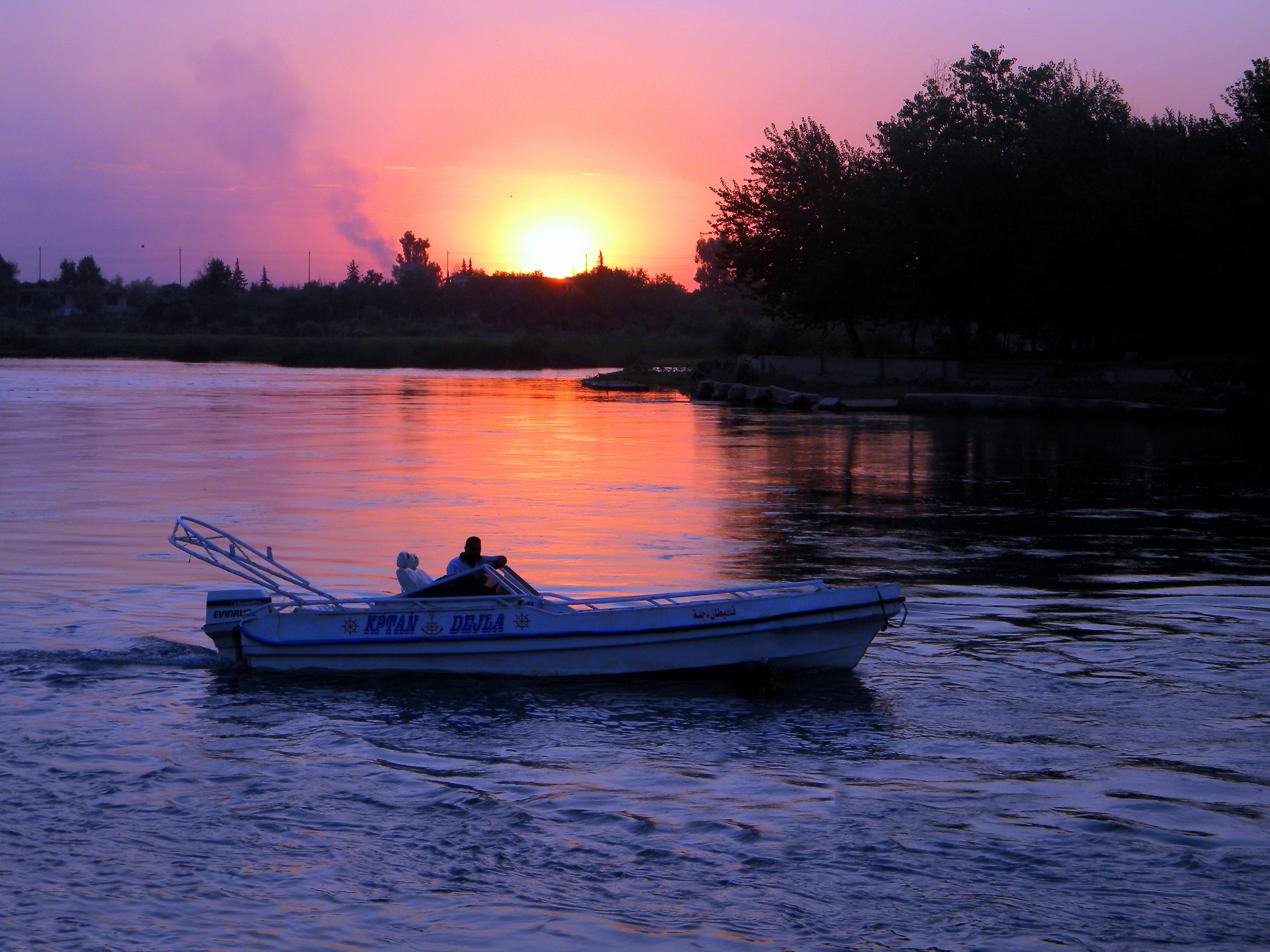
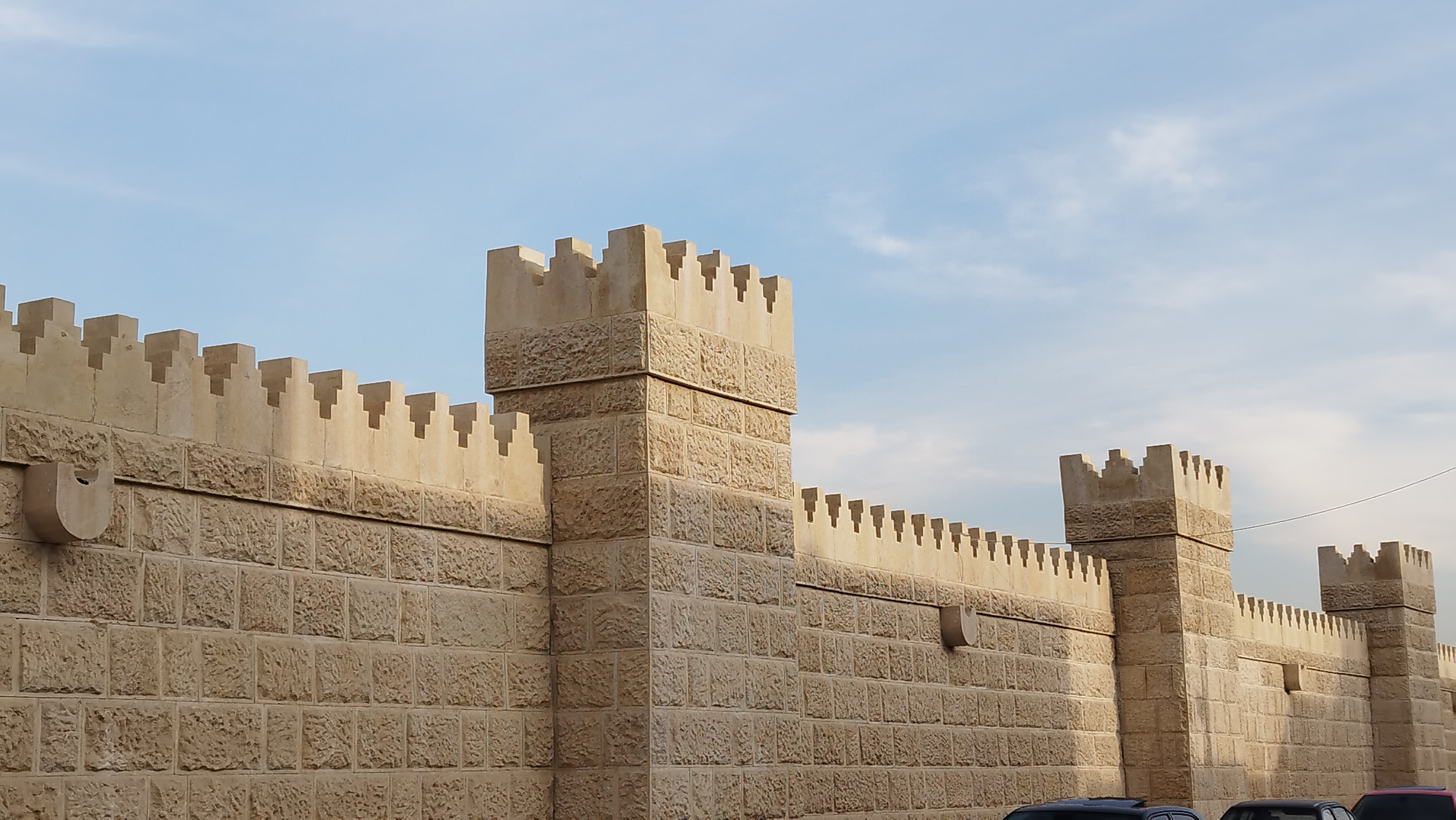
- Top to bottom, left to right: View over Tigris river, an old house in Mosul, Mor Mattai Monastery, Umayyad Mosque (Al-Musaffi), temple of Maran, Hatra, Nineveh Walls and Mosul Corniche
- Nicknames: Nīnwē ܢܝ݂ܢܘܹܐ; The Pearl of the North
- Location in Iraq Mosul (West and Central Asia)
- Coordinates: 36°20′30″N 43°7′45″E
- Country: Iraq
- Governorate: Nineveh
- District: Mosul

Government
  - Type: Mayor–council government
  - Body: Nineveh Governorate
  - Mayor: Abdul Sattar Khidr Al-Habbo

Area
  - Total: 180 km^{2} (69 sq mi)
- Elevation: 223 m (732 ft)

Population (2023)
  - Total: 1,792,000
  - Rank: 2nd in Iraq
  - Density: 10,000/km^{2} (26,000/sq mi)
- Demonym(s): Mosuli; Maslawi
- Time zone: UTC+3 (AST)
- Area code: 60

Mosul (Note: /ˈmoʊsəl, moʊˈsuːl/ MOH-səl, moh-SOOL; Arabic: الموصل, romanized: al-Mawṣil, pronounced [alˈmawsˤil], locally [ɪlˈmoːsˤɪl]; Kurdish: مووسڵ, romanized: Mûsl; Turkish: Musul; Syriac: ܡܘܨܠ, romanized: Moṣil) is a major city in northern Iraq, serving as the capital of Nineveh Governorate. It is the second largest city in Iraq overall after the capital Baghdad. Mosul is situated on the banks of Tigris and the ruins of the ancient Assyrian city of Nineveh, once the largest city in the world, are on the east side of the city.

Due to its strategic and central location, the city has traditionally served as a hub of international commerce and travel in the region. It is considered as one of the historically and culturally significant cities of the Arab world. The North Mesopotamian Arabic spoken in Mosul is known as Maslawi and is widely spoken in the region. Together with the Nineveh Plains, Mosul is a historical center of the Assyrians. The surrounding region is ethnically and religiously diverse; a large majority of the city is Arabs, with Kurds, Assyrians, Turkmens, Shabaks, and other minorities comprising the population. Sunni Islam is the largest religion but there are a sizeable number of Christians and Yazidis as well as adherents of other Muslim sects such as Twelver Shi'ism and Shabakism, and in the past, Iraqi Jews.

The metropolitan area has grown from the old city on the western side to encompass substantial areas on both the "Left Bank" (east side) and the "Right Bank" (west side), as locals call the two respective sides of the Tigris. Historically, essential products of the area included marble and crude oil. The region is rich in oil reserves. Mosul is home to the University of Mosul and its renowned Medical College, one of the Middle East's largest educational and research centers. The city is also home to historic mosques, Christian sites, synagogues and Yazidi temples.

== Etymology ==
In its current Arabic form and spelling (الموصل), the term Mosul (or rather Mawsil) means "linking point", or, loosely, "Junction City". On the city's eastern side are the ruins of the ancient city of Nineveh, and Assyrians still call the entire city Nineveh (or Ninweh).

An early settlement, possibly on the site of the current city of Mosul, was first mentioned by Xenophon in his expeditionary logs of Achaemenid Assyria in 401 BC, during the reign of the Persian Achaemenid Empire. There, he notes a small Assyrian town of "Mépsila" (Ancient Greek: Μέψιλα) on the Tigris, near where Mosul is today (Anabasis, III.iv.10). It may be safer to identify Xenophon's Mépsila with the site of Iski Mosul, or "Old Mosul," about 30 km (19 mi) north of modern Mosul, where six centuries after Xenophon's report, the Sasanian Empire's center of Budh-Ardhashir was built.

Mosul is also nicknamed al-Faiha ("the Paradise"), al-Khaḍrah ("the Green"), and al-Hadbah ("the Humped"). It is sometimes called "The Pearl of the North" and "the city of a million soldiers."

== History ==
=== Ancient era and early Middle Ages ===
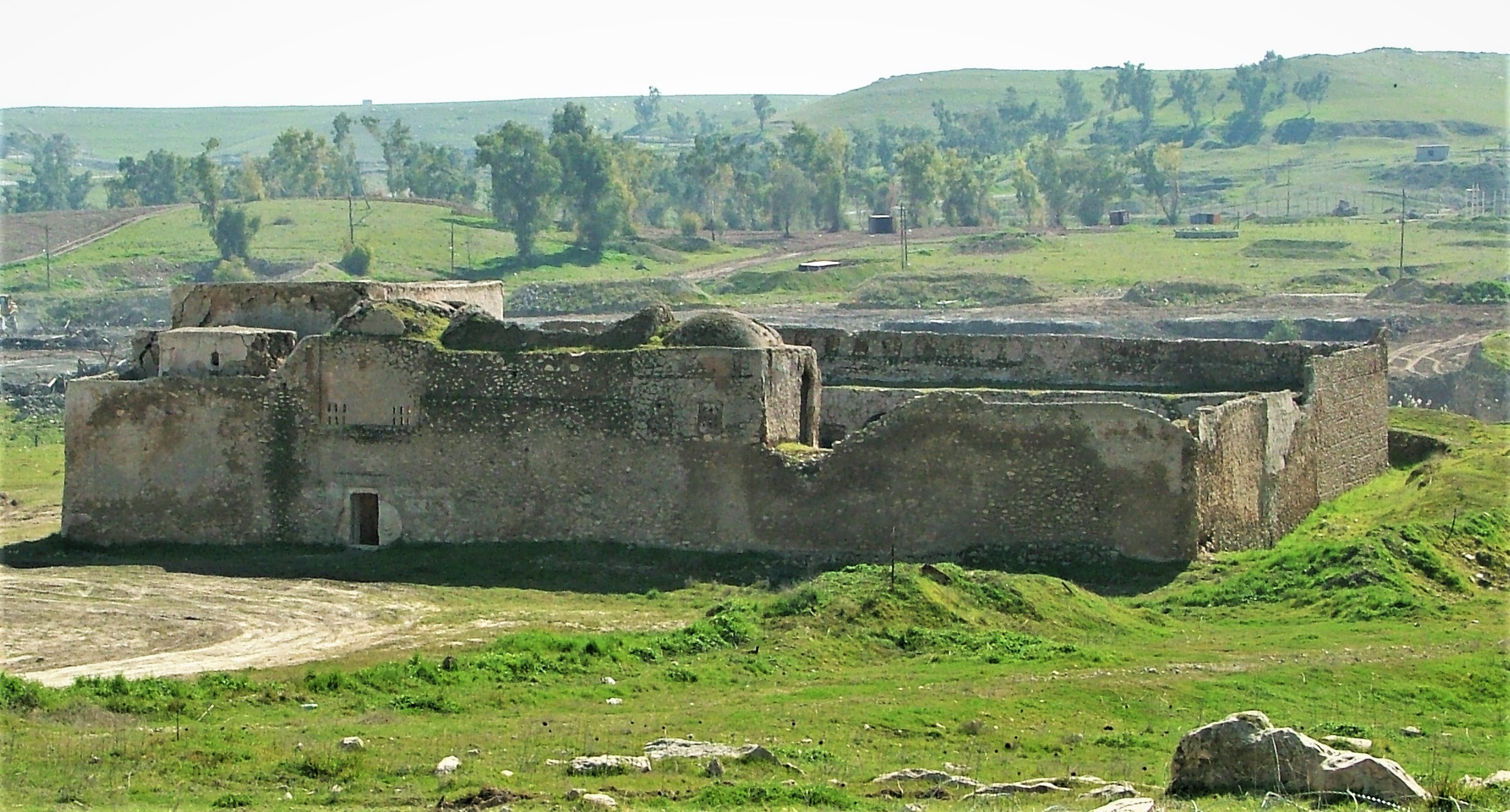
Dair Mar Elia south of Mosul, Iraq's oldest monastery of the Assyrian Church of the East, dating from the 6th century. It was destroyed by IS in 2014

The area where Mosul lies was an integral part of Assyria from as early as the 25th century BC. After the Akkadian Empire (2335–2154 BC), which united all the peoples of Mesopotamia under one rule, Mosul again became a continuous part of Assyria proper from circa 2050 BC through the fall of the Neo-Assyrian Empire between 612 and 599 BC. Mosul remained within the geopolitical province of Assyria for another 13 centuries (as a part of Achaemenid Assyria, Seleucid, Roman Assyria) until the early Muslim conquests of the mid-7th century. During the Roman–Parthian period, the Arab Kingdom of Hatra rose to prominence, flourishing as a major political and cultural center and serving as a buffer state between the two empires, before being destroyed by the Sasanian Empire. Afterward, the region became part of the Sasanian province of Arbāyistān. After the Muslim conquests, the region saw a gradual influx of Muslim Arab, Kurdish, and Turkic peoples, although indigenous Assyrians continued to use the name Athura for the ecclesiastical province.

Nineveh was one of the oldest and most significant cities in antiquity and was settled as early as 6000 BC. The city is mentioned in the Old Assyrian Empire (2025–1750 BC) and during the reign of Shamshi-Adad I (1809–1776 BC) it was listed as a center of worship of the goddess Ishtar, remaining so during the Middle Assyrian Empire (1365–1056 BC). During the Neo-Assyrian Empire (911–605 BC), Nineveh grew in size and importance, particularly from the reigns of Tukulti-Ninurta II and Ashurnasirpal II (883–859 BC) onward; he chose the city of Kalhu (the Biblical Calah, modern Nimrud) as his capital in place of the ancient traditional capital of Aššur (Ashur), 30 km (19 mi) from present-day Mosul.

Thereafter, successive Assyrian emperor-monarchs, such as Shalmaneser III, Adad-nirari III, Tiglath-Pileser III, Shalmaneser V and Sargon II, continued to expand the city. Around 700 BC, King Sennacherib made Nineveh Assyria's new capital. Immense building work was undertaken, and Nineveh eclipsed Babylon, Kalhu and Aššur in size and importance, making it the largest city in the world. Many scholars believe the Hanging Gardens of Babylon were at Nineveh.

The mound of Kuyunjik in Mosul is the site of the palaces of King Sennacherib and his successors Esarhaddon, Ashurbanipal, (who established the Library of Ashurbanipal), Ashur-etil-ilani, Sin-shumu-lishir and Sin-shar-ishkun. The Assyrian Empire began to unravel in 626 BC, being consumed by a decade of brutal internal civil wars, significantly weakening it. A war-ravaged Assyria was attacked in 616 BC by a vast coalition of its former subjects, most notably their Babylonian relations from southern Mesopotamia, together with the Medes, Persians, Chaldeans, Scythians, Cimmerians, and Sagartians. Nineveh fell after a siege and bitter house-to-house fighting in 612 BC during the reign of Sin-shar-ishkun, who was killed defending his capital. His successor, Ashur-uballit II, fought his way out of Nineveh and formed a new Assyrian capital at Harran (now in southeastern Turkey).

Mosul (then the Assyrian town of Mepsila, founded by the former inhabitants out of the ruins of their former capital) later succeeded Nineveh as the Tigris bridgehead of the road that linked Assyria and Anatolia with the short-lived Median Empire and succeeding Achaemenid Empire (546–332 BC), where it was a part of the geopolitical province of Athura (Assyria), where the region, and Assyria in general, saw a significant economic revival.

Mosul became part of the Seleucid Empire after Alexander's conquests in 332 BC. While little is known of the city from the Hellenistic period, Mosul likely belonged to the Seleucid satrapy of Syria, the Greek term for Assyria ("Syria" originally meaning Assyria rather than the modern nation of Syria), which the Parthian Empire conquered circa 150 BC.

Mosul changed hands again with the rise of the Sasanian Empire in 225 and became a part of the Sasanian province of Arbāyistān, which bordered Asoristan to the south, Adiabene to the east, and Armenia to the north, and extended westward roughly along a line from Amida past Singara to the Khabur River and Dura-Europos. Christianity was present among the indigenous Assyrian people in Mosul as early as the 1st century, although the ancient Mesopotamian religion remained strong until the 4th century. It became an episcopal seat of the Assyrian Church of the East in the 6th century.

In 637 (other sources say 641), during the period of the Caliph Umar, Mosul was annexed to the Rashidun Caliphate by Utba ibn Farqad al-Sulami during the early Arab Muslim invasions and conquests, after which Assyria dissolved as a geopolitical entity.

=== 9th century to 1535 ===
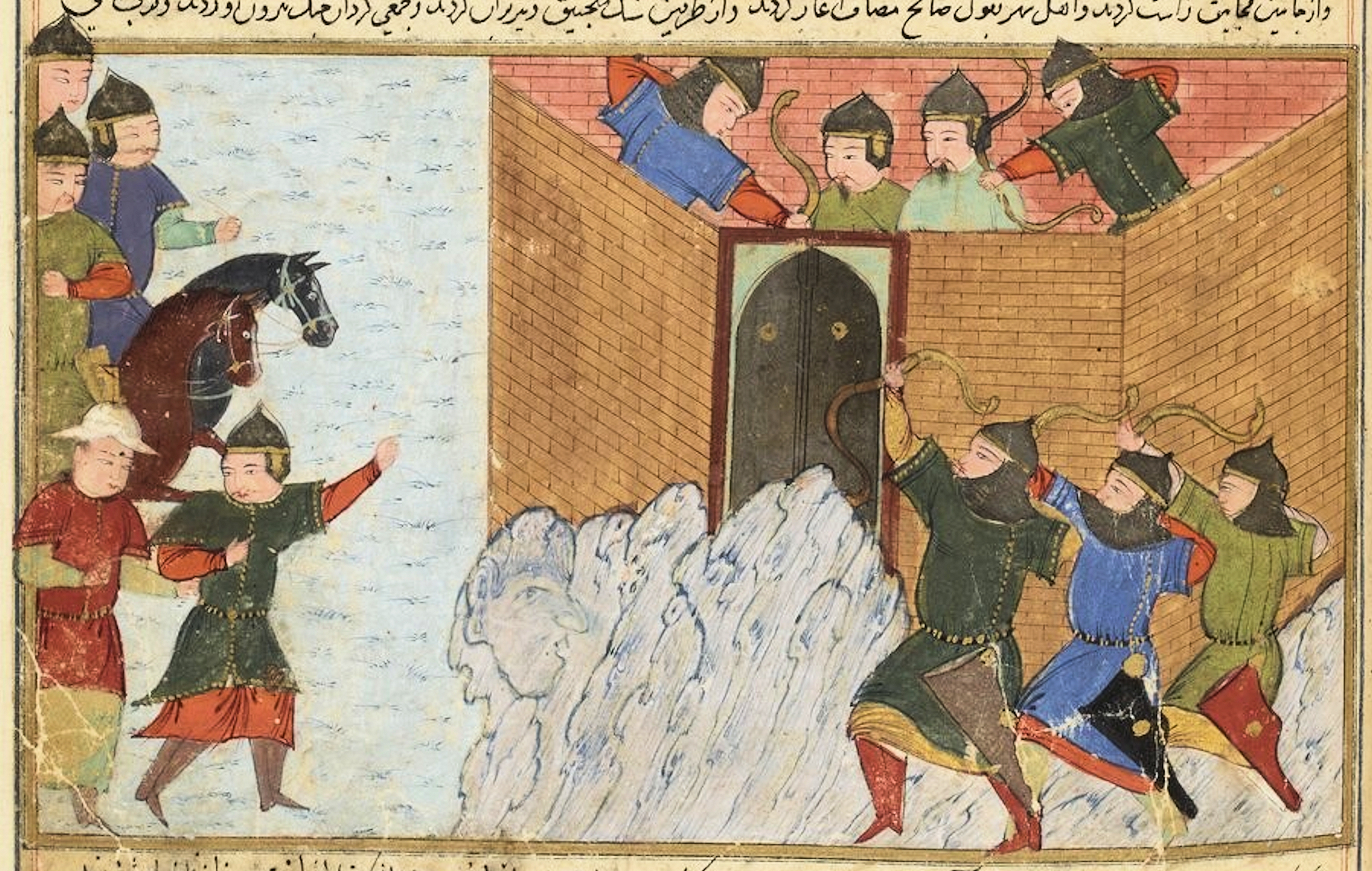
The siege of Mosul in 1261–62

In the late 9th century the Turkic dynasts Ishaq ibn Kundaj and his son Muhammad seized control over Mosul, but in 893 Mosul came once again under the direct control of the Abbasid Caliphate. In the early 10th century Mosul came under the control of the native Arab Hamdanid dynasty. From Mosul, the Hamdanids under Abdallah ibn Hamdan and his son Nasir al-Dawla expanded their control over Upper Mesopotamia for several decades, first as governors of the Abbasids and later as de facto independent rulers. A century later they were supplanted by the Uqaylid dynasty.

Mosul was conquered by the Seljuk Empire in the 11th century. After a period under semi-independent atabeg such as Mawdud, in 1127 it became the centre of power of the Zengid dynasty. Saladin besieged the city of Mosul unsuccessfully in 1182 After his conquest of Aleppo in 1183, ending Zengid rule in Syria, Saladin made a last offensive against Mosul in late 1185, hoping for an easy victory over the presumably demoralized Zengid Emir of Mosul Mas'ud, but failed due to the city's unexpectedly stiff resistance and a serious illness which caused Saladin to withdraw to Harran. Upon Abbasid encouragement, Saladin and Mas'ud negotiated a treaty in March 1186 that left the Zengids in control of Mosul, but under the obligation to supply the Ayyubids with military support when requested. The city remained in control of the Zengids, until Badr al-Din Lu'lu' took over from 1234 to 1259.

During the final stages of the Mongol invasion of Persia and Mesopotamia, in 1258, while about 80 years old, Badr al-Din Lu'lu' went in person to Meraga to offer his submission to the Mongol invader Hulagu. Badr al-Din helped the Khan in his following campaigns in Syria. Mosul was spared destruction, but Badr al-Din died shortly thereafter in 1259. Badr al-Din's son continued in his father's steps, but after the Mongol defeat in the Battle of Ain Jalut (1260) against the Mamluks, he sided with the latter and revolted against the Mongols. Hulagu then besieged the city of Mosul for nine month, and destroyed it in 1262.

Mosul was then ruled by the Mongol Ilkhanate and Jalairid Sultanate and escaped Timur's destructions. In 1165, Benjamin of Tudela passed through Mosul. He wrote about a Jewish community of about 7,000 people led by Rabbi Zakkai, presumed to be a scion of the Davidic line. In 1288–89, when the Exilarch was in Mosul, he signed a supporting paper for Maimonides. In the early 16th century, Mosul was under the Turkmen federation of the Ağ Qoyunlu, and in 1508 it was conquered by the Safavid dynasty of Iran.

=== Metalworking hub ===
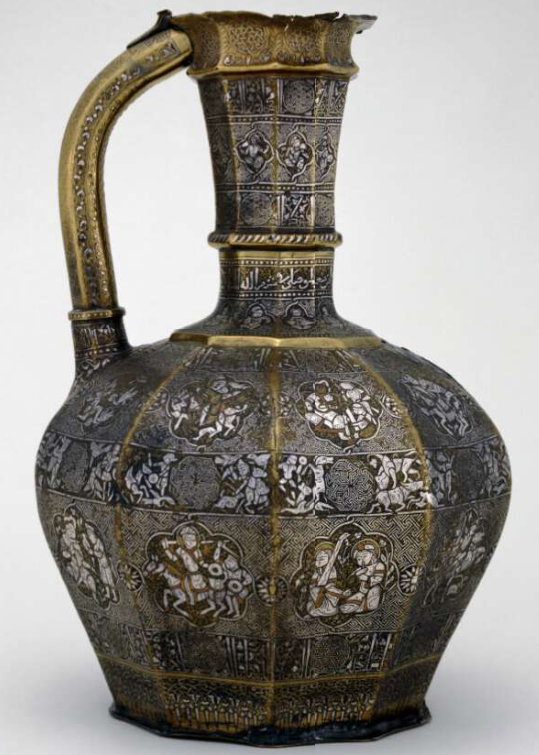
The Blacas ewer, made by Shuja' ibn Man'a in Mosul in 1232, is one of the most famous brass pieces from Mosul

In the 13th century, Mosul had a flourishing industry making luxury brass items that were ornately inlaid with silver. Many of these items survive today; in fact, of all medieval Islamic artifacts, Mosul brasswork has the most epigraphic inscriptions. However, the only reference to this industry in contemporary sources is the account of Ibn Sa'id, an Andalusian geographer who traveled through the region around 1250. He wrote that "there are many crafts in the city, especially inlaid brass vessels which are exported (and presented) to rulers". These were expensive items that only the wealthiest could afford, and it wasn't until the early 1200s that Mosul had the demand for large-scale production of them. Mosul was then a wealthy, prosperous capital city, first for the Zengids and then for Badr al-Din Lu'lu'.

The origins of Mosul's inlaid brasswork industry are uncertain. The city had an iron industry in the late 10th century, when al-Muqaddasi recorded that it exported iron and iron goods like buckets, knives and chains. However, no surviving metal objects from Mosul are known before the early 13th century. Inlaid metalworking in the Islamic world was first developed in Khurasan in the 12th century by silversmiths facing a shortage of silver. By the mid-12th century, Herat in particular had gained a reputation for its high-quality inlaid metalwork. The practice of inlaying "required relatively few tools" and the technique spread westward, perhaps by Khurasani artisans moving to other cities.

By the turn of the 13th century, the silver-inlaid-brass technique had reached Mosul. A pair of engraved brass flabella found in Egypt and possibly made in Mosul are dated by a Syriac inscription to the year 1202, which would make them the earliest known Mosul brasses with a definite date (although they are not inlaid with anything). One extant item may be even older: an inlaid ewer by the master craftsman Ibrahim ibn Mawaliya is of an unknown date, but D.S. Rice estimated that it was made around 1200. Production of inlaid brasswork in Mosul may have already begun before the turn of the century.

The body of Mosul metalwork significantly expands in the 1220s – several signed and dated items are known from this decade, which according to Julian Raby "probably reflects the craft's growing status and production." In the two decades from roughly 1220 to 1240, the Mosul brass industry saw "rapid innovations in technique, decoration, and composition". Artisans were inspired by miniature paintings produced in the Mosul area. Mosul seems to have become predominant among Muslim centers of metalwork in the early 13th century. Evidence is partial and indirect – relatively few objects which directly state where they were made exist, and in the rest of cases it depends on nisbahs. However, al-Mawsili is by far the most common nisbah; only two others are attested: al-Is'irdi (referring to someone from Siirt) and al-Baghdadi. There are, however, some scientific instruments inlaid with silver that were made in Syria during this period, with the earliest being 1222/3 (619 AH). Instability after the death of Badr al-Din Lu'lu' in 1259, and especially the Mongol Siege of Mosul in July 1262, probably caused a decline in Mosul's metalworking industry. There is a relative lack of known metalwork from the Jazira in the late 1200s; meanwhile, an abundance of metalwork from Mamluk Syria and Egypt is attested from this same period. This doesn't necessarily mean that production in Mosul ended, though, and some extant objects from this period may have been made in Mosul.

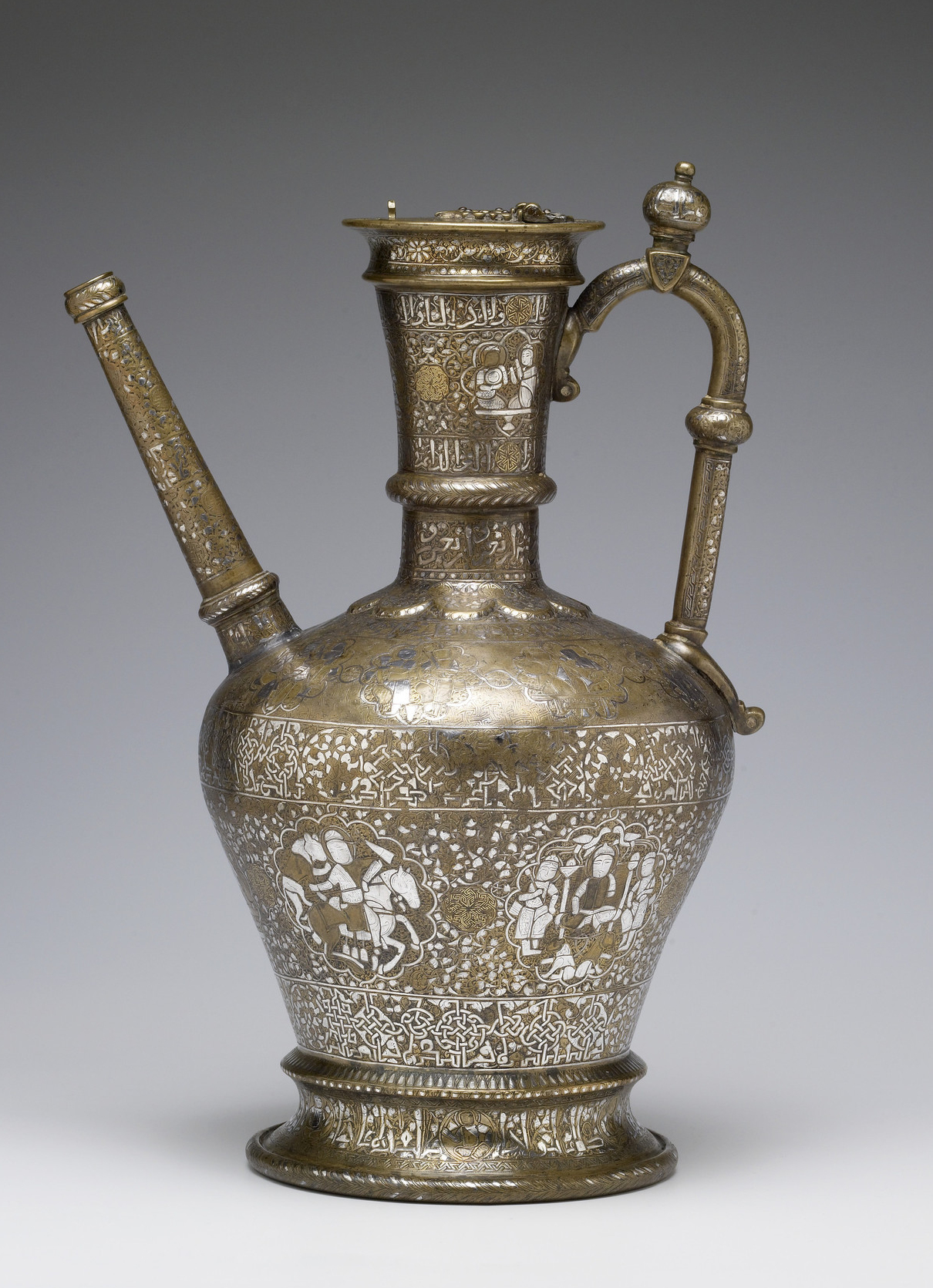
Ewer from Mosul, 1246–1247 CE

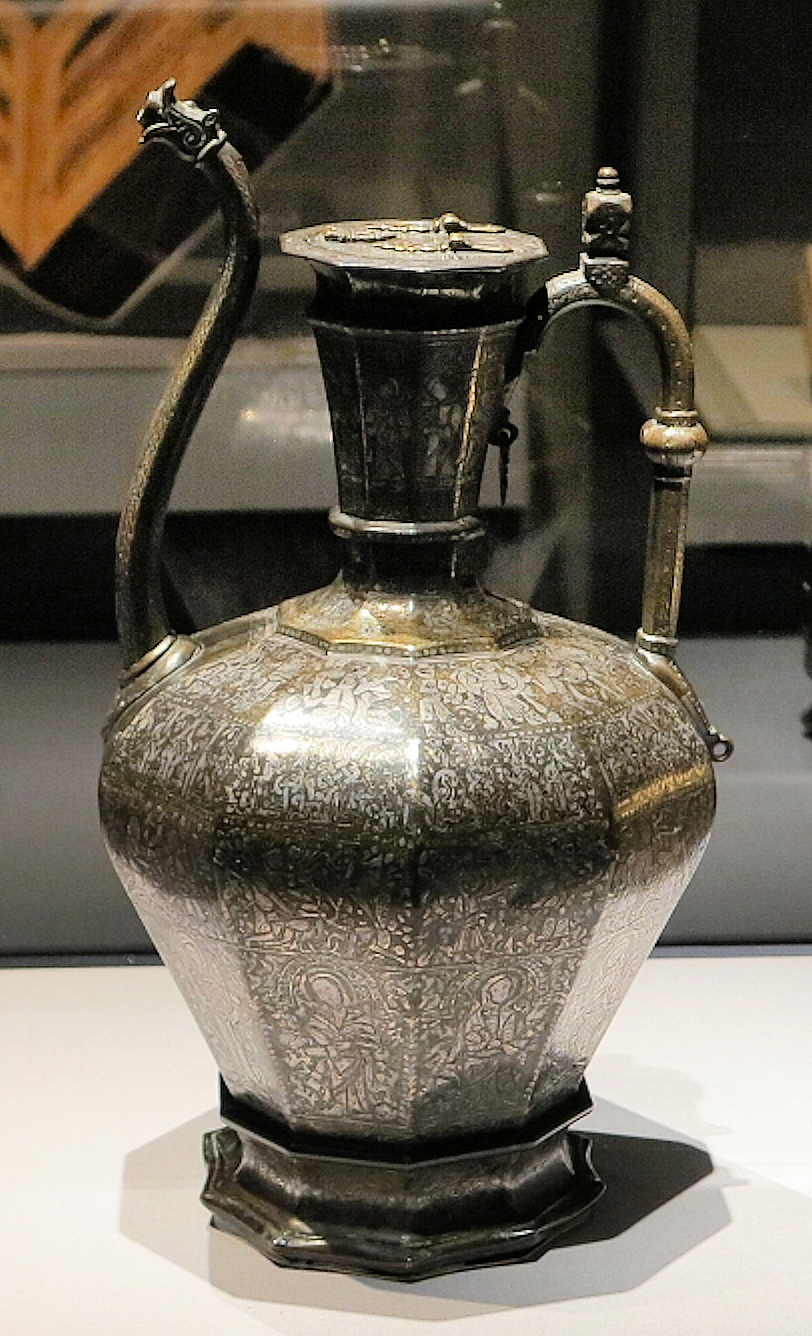
Homberg ewer. Inlaid Brass with Christian Iconography. probably Mosul, dated 1242–43

The earliest definite evidence of Mawsili craftsmen emigrating westward to Mamluk Syria and Egypt dates from the 1250s. Extant Mawsili works from these regions seem to be the result of one particular family setting up workshops in Damascus and then Cairo rather than a mass movement of Mosul artisans to those cities. Five Mawsili craftsmen are known from these two cities in the late 13th century, of which 3 or 4 are members of this same family. The first is Husayn ibn Muhammad al-Mawsili, who produced the earliest known silver-inlaid work from Damascus in the late 1250s. His presumed son, Ali ibn Husayn ibn Muhammad al-Mawsili, was active in Cairo several decades later. However, the earliest known silver-inlaid brasswork from Cairo belongs to another presumed member of this family, Muhammad ibn Hasan. His one known work, a candlestick dated to 1269, has an inscription which suggests he died before it was completed. The "key figure" for early Mamluk metalwork in Cairo, however, was Ali ibn Husayn. His works from the 1280s both show Mosul influence as well as a different "early Mamluk" style.

A final member was Husayn ibn Ahmad ibn Husayn, a grandson of Husayn ibn Muhammad, who was active at the turn of the 14th century and made "a major work" for the Rasulid sultan al-Mu'ayyad Hizabr al-Din Dawud ibn Yusuf. This family appears to have initiated "two of the most characteristic features of 14th-century Mamluk metalwork: large-scale inspirational candlesticks, and large multi-lobed medallions with a wide border that eventually became filled with flying ducks". Mosul metalwork eventually influenced a tradition of metal inlay in Fars and elsewhere in western Iran in the 14th century. The Ilkhanids rounding up artisans and gathering them in their capital of Tabriz for centralized royal production may have played a role in this transmission. Only two items are definitively known to have been produced in Mosul. The first is the Blacas ewer, made by Shuja' ibn Man'a in 1232, and the second is a silver-inlaid pen box made by Ali ibn Yahya in 1255/6 (653 AH). No other works by either craftsman are known. They form part of the broader Mosul work which consists of 35 known surviving brasses made by artisans with the nisbah al-Mawsili, by some 27 different makers. 80% of them are from the years 1220 to 1275, and the remaining 20% are from 1275 to about 1325.

Modern western scholarship has termed this body of metalwork attributed to Mosul the "Mosul School", although the validity of this grouping is disputed. The "indiscriminate" attribution of silver-inlaid brasses to Mosul, particularly by Gaston Migeon at the turn of the 20th century, led to a reaction against the term. Later scholars such as Max van Berchem, Mehmet Ağa-Oğlu, and D.S. Rice all took a more skeptical view; van Berchem in particular argued that only six known items could be definitely attributed to Mosul, and others were likely made elsewhere. Souren Melikian-Chirvani remarked in 1973 that Mosul had been famous in the west for a century for metalwork it did not make. However, Julian Raby has defended the concept of the Mosul School, arguing that the city did have a distinct metalworking tradition with its own techniques, styles and motifs, and sense of community. He compared Mosul's metalwork to Kashan's pottery and wrote that "Mawsili metalworkers displayed a conscious sense of community and tradition and, at least in the early years, a proud acknowledgement of tradition" and that the city's metalwork gained a wide reputation or "brand value" lasting for over a century.

Part of Raby's argument was that many items shared one or two recurring symbols that "served no practical purpose" and may have been meant as a "brand", "workshop mark", a "guild emblem", or "perhaps as a mark of master craftsmanship". The first one is an octagon filled with complex geometric patterns, which appears on at least 13 items over the course of three decades: the 1220s through the 1240s. Several of the most important Mosul artists from what Raby terms the "second generation of Mosul metalwork" all used this symbol: Ahmad al-Dhaki, Ibn Jaldak, Shuja' ibn Man'a, Dawud ibn Salama, and Yunus ibn Yusuf. A notable absence is Ibrahim ibn Mawaliya, a member of the first generation. The octagon disappears after about 1250, and is also not used by workers known to have been outside Mosul.

Another recurring symbol is a rosette with either 10 or 12 leaves found at the bottom of the item – either the base of a ewer or the bottom of the shaft of a candlestick. This is not normally visible, and perhaps because it served no practical purpose, it was eventually abandoned around the middle of the century. The last example of this rosette is the bottom of a candlestick made by Dawud ibn Salama in 1248/9 (646 AH). Raby suggested that Ibrahim ibn Mawaliya "may have been a seminal figure" in the Mosul brasswork industry. The particular phrasing of the "benedictory inscriptions" on his objects, bestowing good luck on their owners, is repeated in several works by other Mosul craftsmen. Two assistants of Ibrahim ibn Mawaliya's are known: his tilmidh (apprentice) Isma'il ibn Ward, and his ghulam Qasim ibn Ali. Ahmad al-Dhaki's workshop was possibly also "intimately connected to others in Mosul".

The Mosul metalwork is the only example in the Muslim world where metalworkers recorded their relationships between masters and apprentices (tilmidh) and hirelings (ajir). This was apparently a point of pride for Mosul artisans. Julian Raby speculated that two elaborate but impractically tiny Mosuli objects, a tiny 6x4 cm box made by Isma'il ibn Ward and an anonymous 8-cm-tall bucket, were made as "credential work" by apprentice or journeyman metalworkers as part of a test to be accepted into a craftsman's guild. According to Raby, the Mosul metalwork may have been part of the gifts that Badr al-Din Lu'lu' gave to other rulers to appease them as part of his realpolitik diplomacy. Another notable item tentatively attributed to Mosul metalworkers is the Courtauld bag, which is believed to be the world's oldest surviving handbag. It was likely made for a noblewomen of the Ilkhanate during the early 1300s.

=== Ottoman period ===
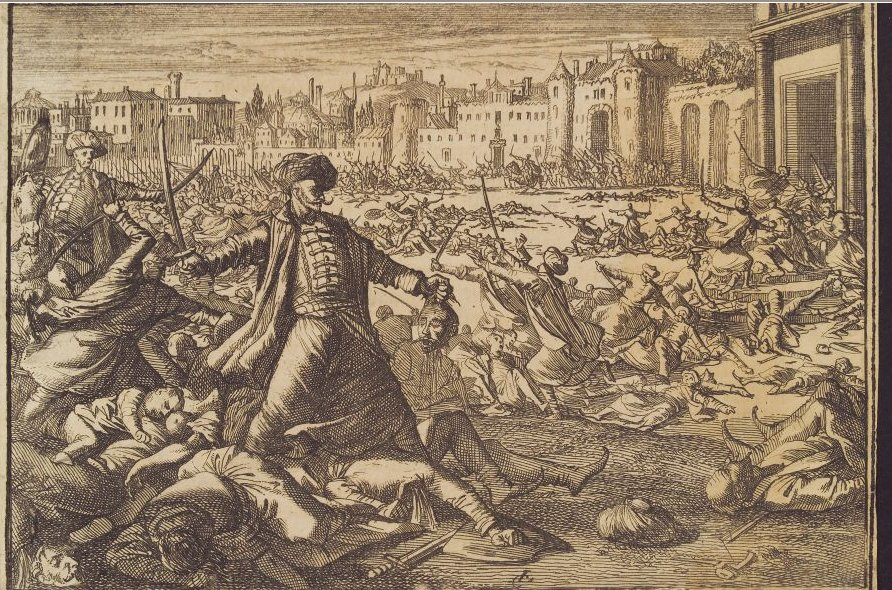
Conquest of Mosul (Nineveh) by Mustafa Pasha in 1631, a Turkish soldier in the foreground holding a severed head. L., C. (Stecher) 1631 -1650

What started as irregular attacks in 1517 were finalized in 1538, when Ottoman Sultan Suleiman the Magnificent added Mosul to his empire by capturing it from his arch-rival, Safavid Persia. Thenceforth Mosul was governed by a pasha. Following its capture, Mosul was incorporated into the Baghdad Eyalet, as confirmed by imperial registers from 1558 to 1587, which list sanjaks ranging from Zakho and Erbil in the north to areas around the Mesopotamian Marshes in the south. Mosul was celebrated for its line of walls, comprising seven gates with large towers, a renowned hospital (maristan) and a covered market (qaysariyya), and its fabrics and flourishing trades.

Ottoman Iraq had been acquired by the Ottoman Empire in 1555 by the Peace of Amasya, but until the Treaty of Zuhab in 1639 Ottoman control over Mesopotamia was not decisive. After the Peace of Amasya, the Safavids recaptured most of Mesopotamia one more time during the reign of king Abbas I (r. 1588–1629). Among the newly appointed Safavid governors of Mesopotamia during those years was Qasem Sultan Afshar, who was appointed governor of Mosul in 1622. Before 1638, the Ottomans considered Mosul "still a mere fortress, important for its strategic position as an offensive platform for Ottoman campaigns into Iraq, as well as a defensive stronghold and staging post guarding the approaches to Anatolia and to the Syrian coast. Then, with the Ottoman reconquest of Baghdad (1638), the liwa of Mosul became an independent wilaya."

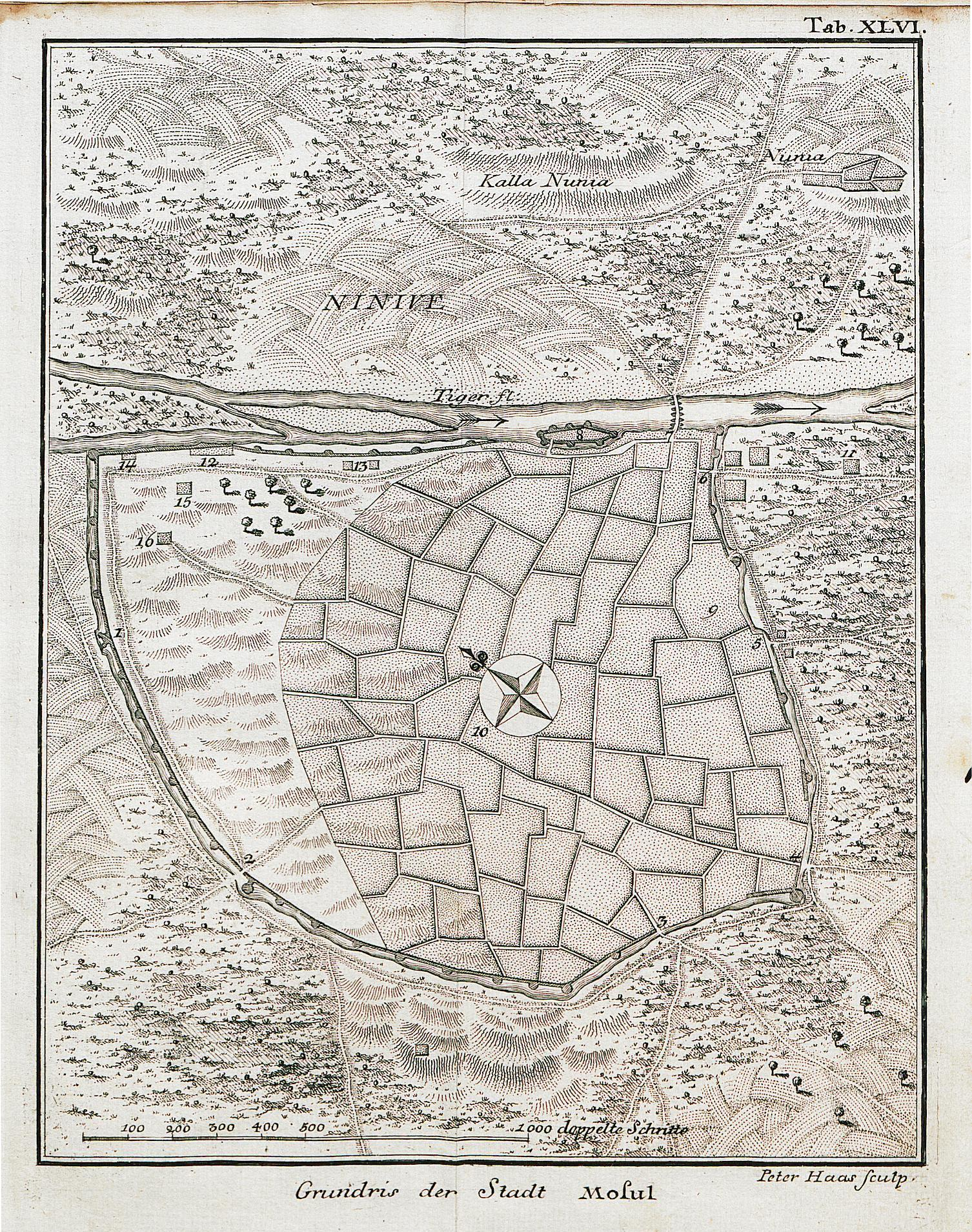
Map of Mosul in 1778, by Carsten Niebuhr

Despite being a part of the Ottoman Empire, during the four centuries of Ottoman rule Mosul was considered "the most independent district" within the Middle East, following the Roman model of indirect rule through local notables. "Mosuli culture developed less along Ottoman–Turkish lines than along Iraqi–Arab lines; and Turkish, the official language of the State, was certainly not the dominant language in the province."

In line with its status as a politically stable trade route between the Mediterranean and the Persian Gulf, Mosul developed considerably during the 17th and early 18th centuries. Like the development of the Mamluk dynasty in Baghdad, during this time "the Jalili family was establishing itself as the undisputed master of Mosul" and "helping to connect Mosul with a pre-Ottoman, pre-Turcoman, pre-Mongol, Arab cultural heritage that was to put the town on its way to recapturing some of the prestige and prominence it had enjoyed under the golden reign of Badr ad-Din Lu'lu'." Along with the al-Umari and Tasin al-Mufti families, the Jalilis formed an "urban-based small and medium gentry and a new landed elite", which proceeded to displace the control of previous rural tribes. Such families establish themselves through private enterprise, solidifying their influence and assets through rents on land and taxes on manufacturing.

As well as by elected officials, Mosul's social architecture was highly influenced by the Dominican fathers who arrived in Mosul in 1750, sent by Pope Benedict XIV (Mosul had a large Christian population, predominantly indigenous Assyrians). In 1873 they were followed by the Dominican nuns, who established schools, health clinics, a printing press, an orphanage, and workshops to teach girls sewing and embroidery. A congregation of Dominican sisters founded in the 19th century still had its motherhouse in Mosul in the early 21st century. Over 120 Assyrian Iraqi Sisters belonged to this congregation.

In the 19th century the Ottoman government started to reclaim central control over its outlying provinces. Their aim was to "restore Ottoman law, and rejuvenate the military" and to revive "a secure tax base for the government". In order to reestablish rule, in 1834 the sultan abolished public elections for governor, and began "neutraliz[ing] local families such as the Jalilis and their class" and appointing new, non-Maslawi governors directly. In line with its reintegration within central government rule, Mosul was required to conform to new Ottoman reform legislation, including the standardization of tariff rates, the consolidation of internal taxes and the integration of the administrative apparatus with the central government.

This process started in 1834 with the appointment of Bayraktar Mehmed Pasha, who was to rule Mosul for the next four years. After his reign, the Ottoman government (wishing still to restrain the influence of powerful local families) appointed a series of governors in rapid succession, ruling "for only a brief period before being sent somewhere else to govern, making it impossible for any of them to achieve a substantial local power base." Mosul's importance as a trading center declined after the opening of the Suez Canal, which enabled goods to travel to and from India by sea rather than by land through Mosul. Mosul was the capital of Mosul Vilayet, one of the three vilayets (provinces) of Ottoman Iraq, with a brief break in 1623, when Persia seized the city.

=== 1918 to 1990s ===
At the end of World War I in October 1918, after the Armistice of Mudros, British forces occupied Mosul. After the war, the city and surrounding area became part of the British-occupied Iraq (1918–1920) and then Mandatory Iraq (1920–1932). This mandate was contested by Turkey, which continued to claim the area on the grounds that it was under Ottoman control during the signature of the Armistice. In the Treaty of Lausanne, the dispute over Mosul was left for future resolution by the League of Nations. In 1926, Iraq's possession of Mosul was confirmed by the League of Nations' brokered agreement between Turkey and Great Britain. Former Ottoman Mosul Vilayet became the Nineveh Governorate of Iraq, but Mosul remained the provincial capital. Following the fall of the Ottoman Empire, many Ottoman buildings were demolished, first under the British Mandate and later under King Faisal. Mosul was also site of uprisings by Arab nationalists against Qasim in 1959 by Colonel Abdul Wahab al-Shawaf, which was violently suppressed and al-Saadi was executed.

Until the 1950s the Mosul plain was an important center for Chaldaean community. Like the Assyrians, many moved southwards after the 1933 massacre in Simele, which resulted death of approximately 6,000 Assyrians. In 1932 70% of the Christians lived in and around Mosul, by 1957 only 47% remained there. In 1972, the recognized cultural rights for Iraqi Christians and Assyrians. Mosul was home to a large Ba'ath Party headquarters and was an important military center. Oil was discovered in the area surrounding Mosul in the late 1920s. The Ba'athist government nationalized oil in 1972 and used oil revenues for the city's infrastructure development and diversification of economy. Mosul benefited considerably from the development of oilfields in the region, and became a hub for cement, textile and sugar industries. The opening of the University of Mosul in 1967 enabled the education of many in the city and surrounding area.

However, the city's infrastructure was partially destroyed during the Iran–Iraq War. After the 1991 uprisings, Mosul was included in the northern no-fly zone imposed and patrolled by the United States and the United Kingdom between 1991 and 2003. Although this prevented Saddam's forces from mounting large-scale military operations again in the region, it did not stop his regime from implementing a steady policy of "Arabisation" by which the demography of some areas of Nineveh Governorate were gradually changed. Despite this program, Mosul and its surrounding towns and villages remained home to a mixture of Arabs, Kurds, Assyrians, Armenians, Turkmens, Shabaks, a few Jews, and isolated populations of Yazidis, Mandeans, Kawliya and Circassians.

In the 1990s, the Faith Campaign was initiated to strengthen the regime's power by aligning with Salafi Islam under Izzat Ibrahim al-Douri. This campaign aimed to foster support for the regime through a more visible embrace of conservative Islamic ideologies. Northwest Mosul became a significant base for Salafism during this period, and other regions south of Mosul also saw rapid growth of Salafi, Wahhabi, and extremist ideologies, creating an environment conducive to their spread. Saddam's government empowered tribal sheikhs from these areas, granting them significant influence in Mosul's urban population. These sheikhs, with their newfound authority, helped in introduce and promote extremist views within the city. Large mosques such as Mosul Grand Mosque were built. Over time, this contributed to Mosul becoming a more tribal society, where traditional legal systems were often bypassed in favor of tribal reconciliations led by sheikhs. Historically, the city had been known for its conservative religious beliefs, primarily rooted in Sufism, which was considered moderate and non-extremist.

Mosul in modern era (1918–2003)

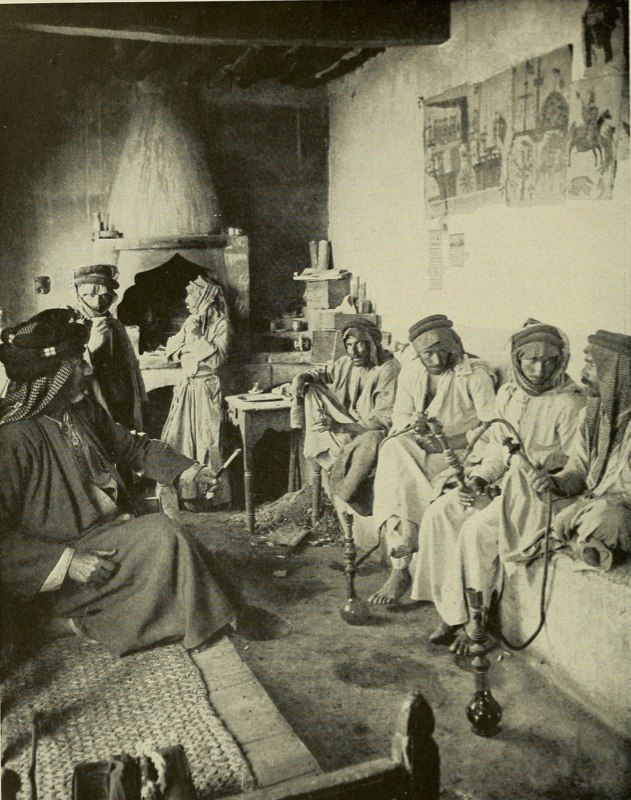
A coffee house in Mosul, 1914

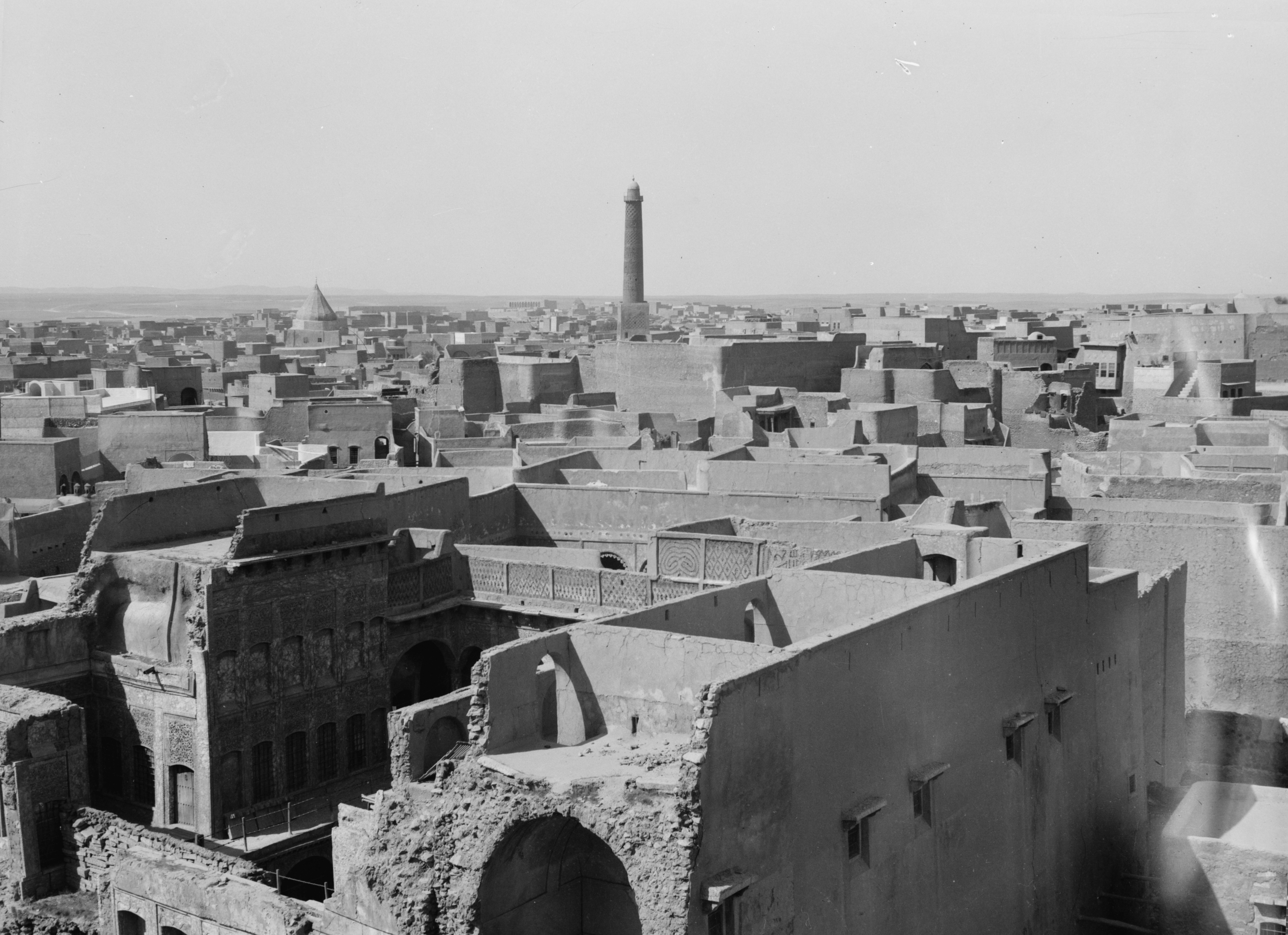
The leaning minaret of Great Mosque of al-Nuri gave Mosul its nickname "the hunchback" (الحدباء al-Ḥadbāˈ)

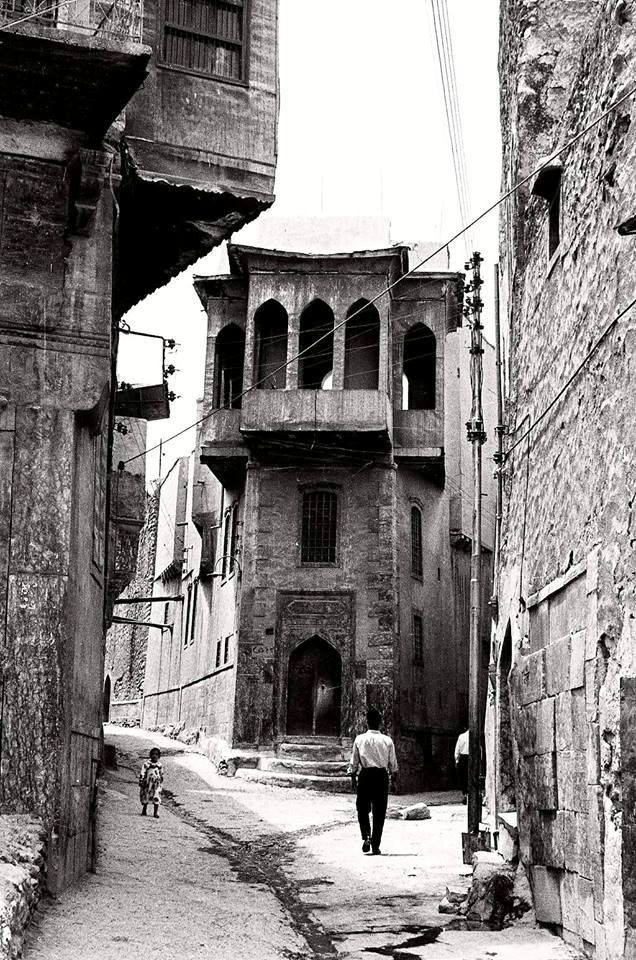
Mosul, 1968

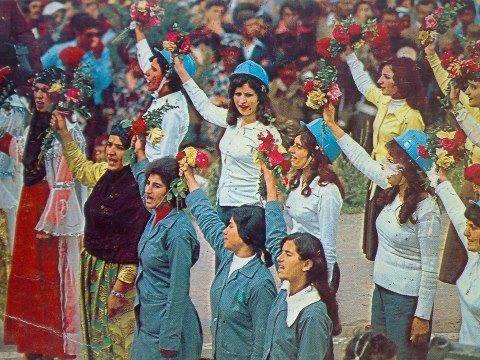
Women in Mosul Spring Festival - 1977

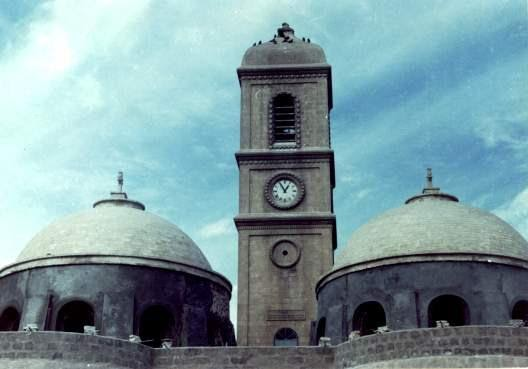
Latin Church, Mosul 1980s

=== 21st century ===
Mosul fell on 11 April 2003 during the invasion of Iraq, when the Iraqi Army 5th Corps, abandoned the city and surrendered two days after the fall of Baghdad. U.S. Army Special Forces with Kurdish fighters quickly took civil control of the city.

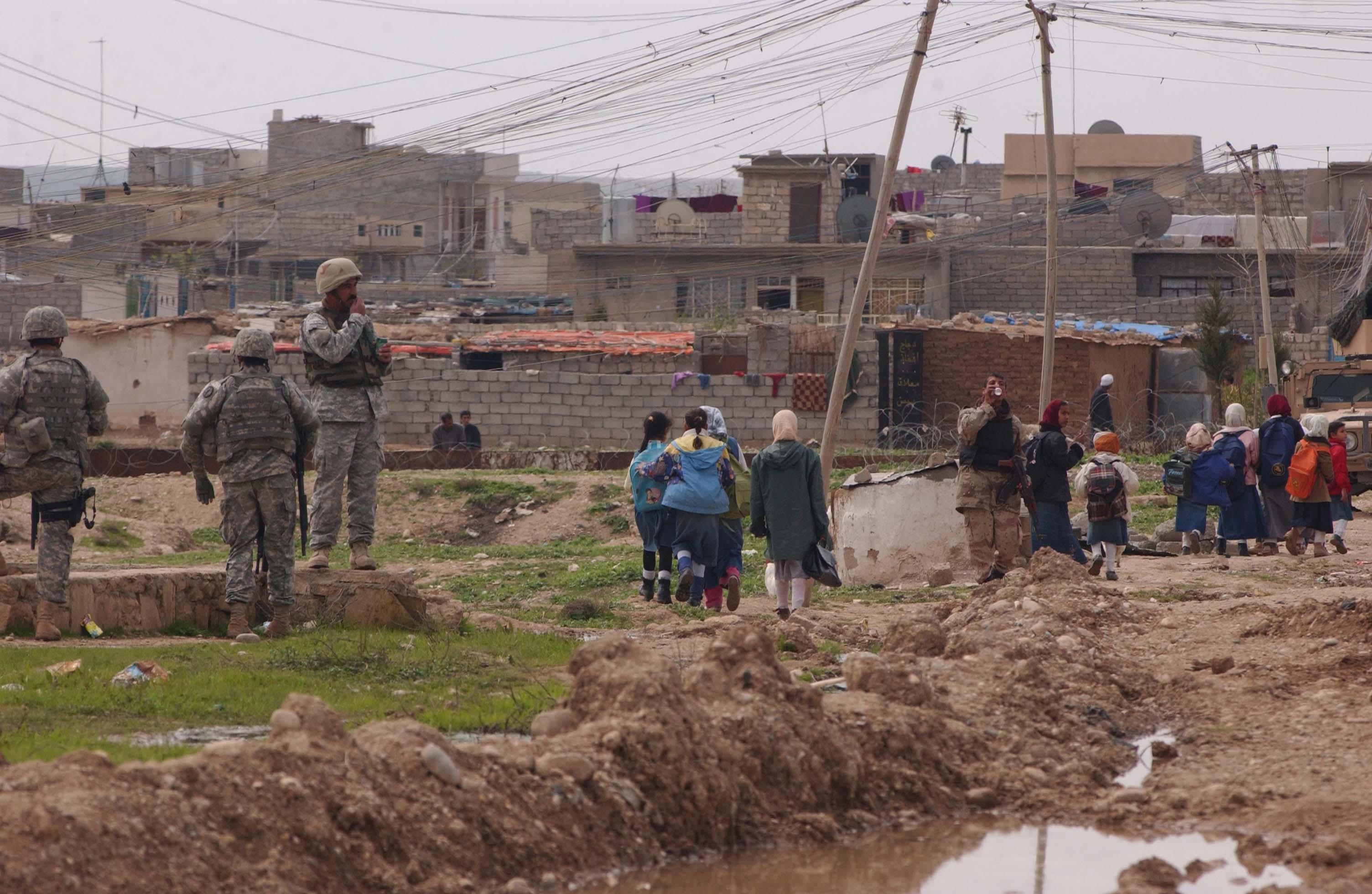
Iraqi police, U.S. soldiers patrol neighborhood in Mosul, 19 March 2007

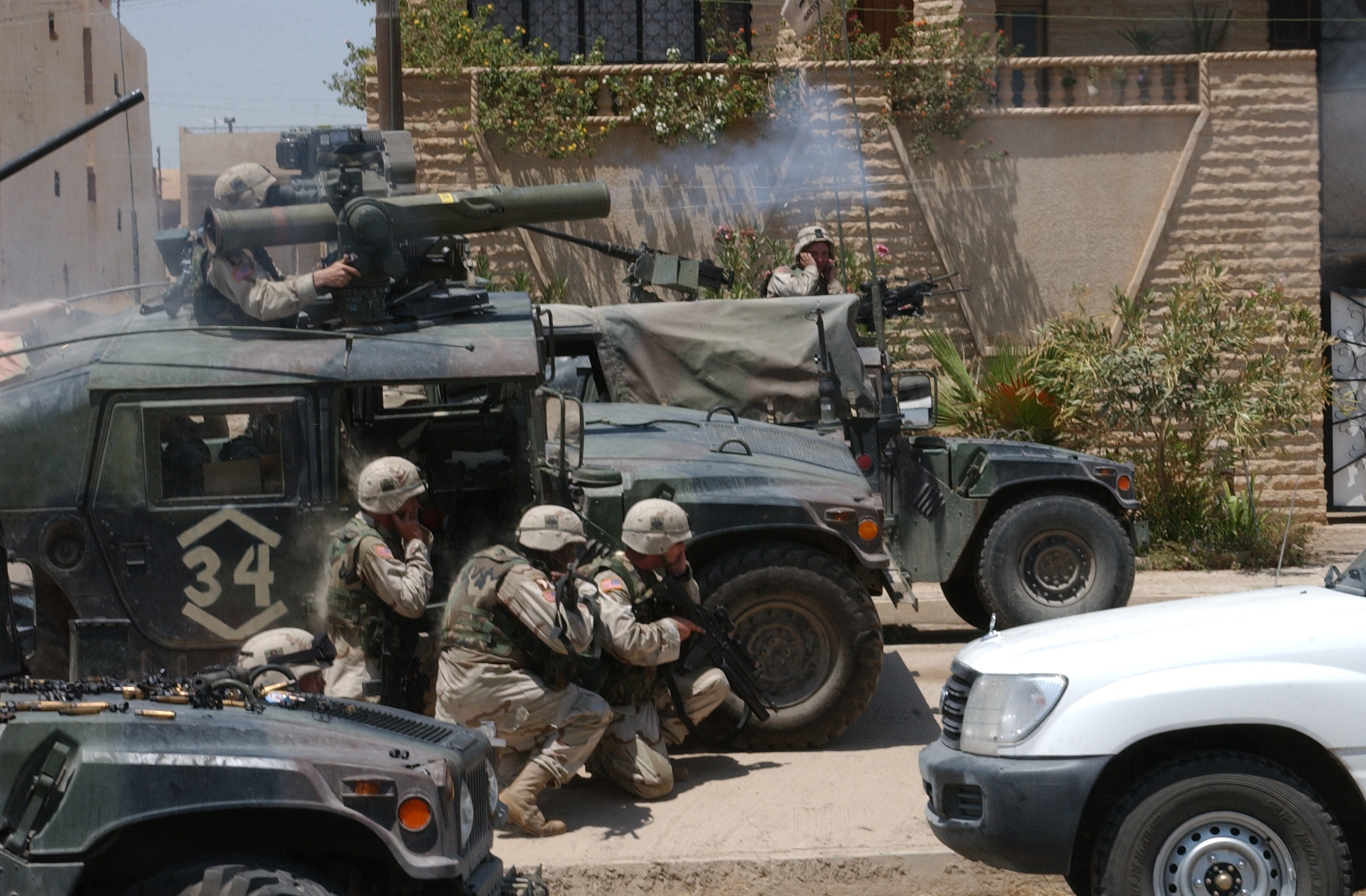
Saddam Hussein's sons Qusay and Uday were killed in a gun battle in Mosul on 22 July 2003

On 22 July, Saddam Hussein's sons, Uday Hussein and Qusay Hussein, were killed in a gun battle with coalition forces in Mosul after a failed attempt at their capture. Mosul served as the operational base for the US Army's 101st Airborne Division during the occupational phase of the Operation Iraqi Freedom. During its tenure, the 101st Airborne Division was able to extensively survey the city and, advised by the 431st Civil Affairs Battalion, non-governmental organizations, and the people of Mosul, began reconstruction work by employing the people of Mosul in different sectors. Other U.S. Army units also occupied the city.

On 24 June 2004, a coordinated series of car bombs killed 62 people, many of them policemen. On 21 December 14 American soldiers, four American employees of Halliburton, and four Iraqi soldiers were killed in a suicide attack on a dining hall at the Forward Operating Base (FOB) Marez next to the main U.S. military airfield at Mosul. The Pentagon reported that 72 other personnel were injured in the attack, carried out by a suicide bomber wearing an explosive vest and the uniform of the Iraqi security services. The Islamist group Army of Ansar al-Sunna (partly evolved from Ansar al-Islam) took responsibility for the attack in an online statement.

In December 2007, Mosul International Airport was reopened. An Iraqi Airways flight carried 152 Hajj pilgrims to Baghdad, the first commercial flight since U.S. forces declared a no-fly zone in 1993, though further commercial flight remained prohibited. On 23 January 2008, an explosion in an apartment building killed 36 people. The next day, a suicide bomber dressed as a police officer assassinated the local police chief, Brigadier General Salah Mohammed al-Jubouri, the director of police for Nineveh province, as he toured the site of the blast.

In May 2008, US-backed Iraqi Army Forces led by Major General Riyadh Jalal Tawfiq, the commander of military operations in Mosul, launched a military offensive of the Ninawa campaign in hopes of bringing stability and security to the city.

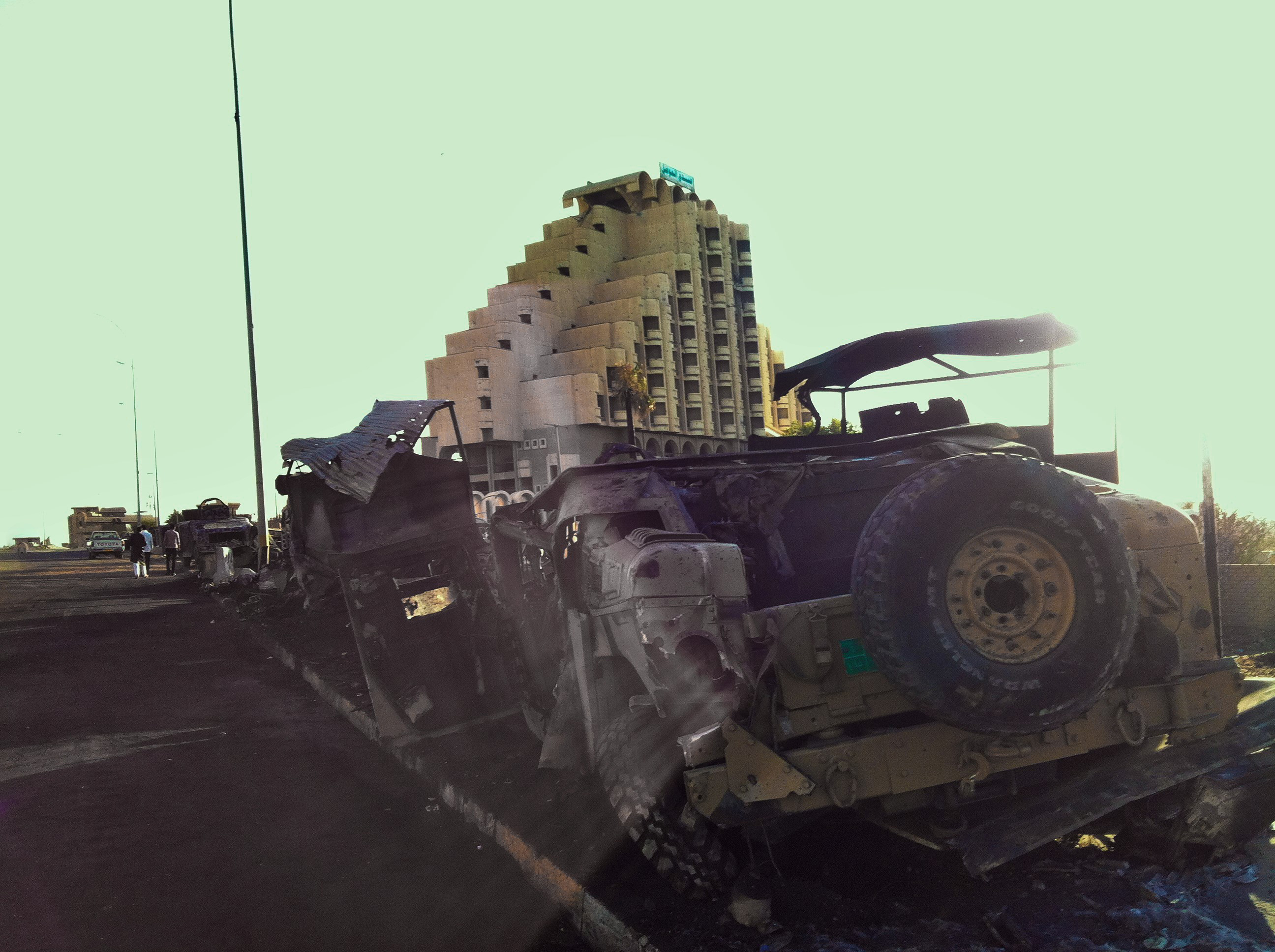
Humvee down after Islamic State attack in 2014

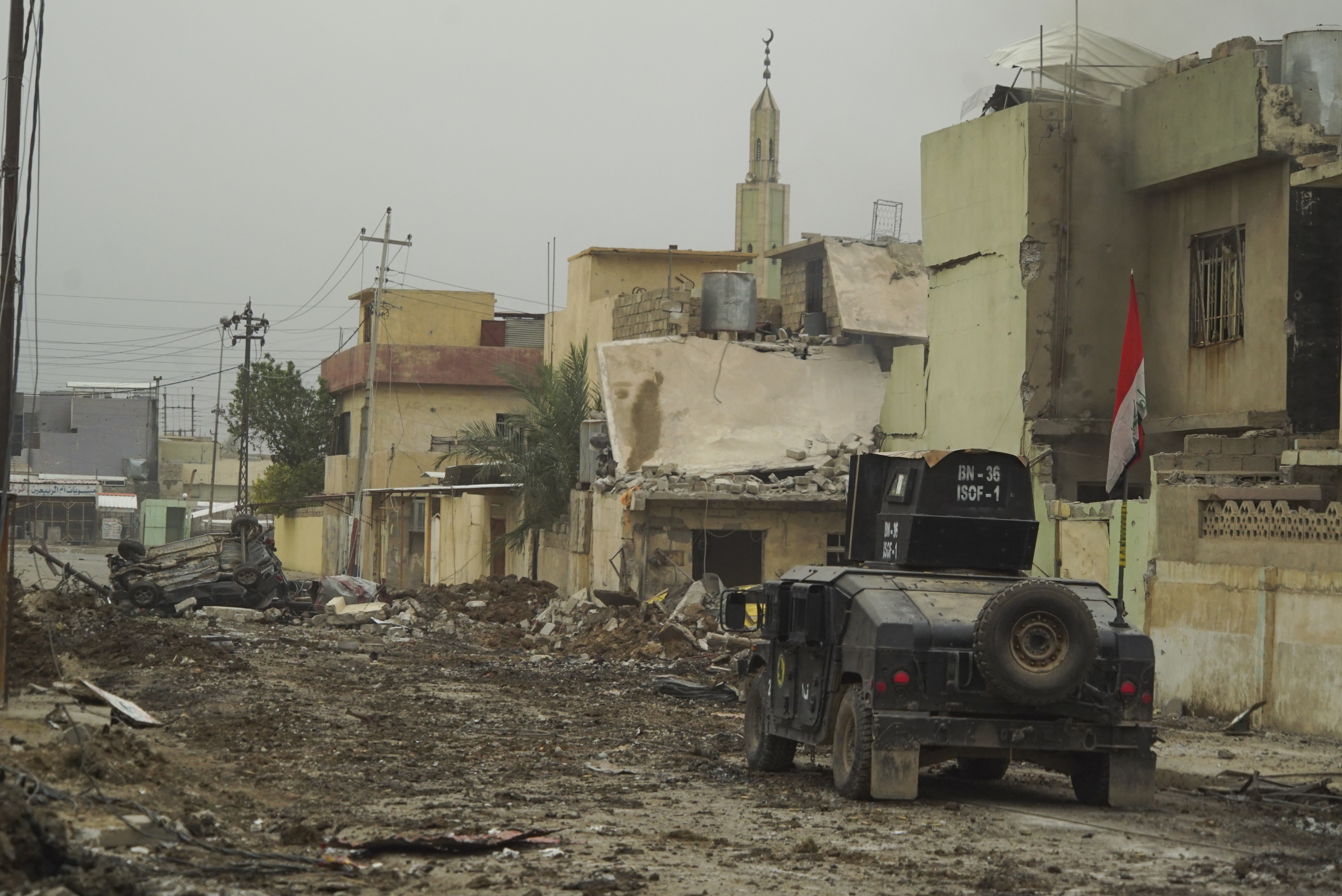
ISOF on the street of Mosul, 16 November 2016. The city was liberated in 2017

In 2008, many Assyrian Christians fled the city, following a wave of murders and threats against their community. The murder of a dozen Assyrians, threats that others would be murdered unless they converted to Islam, and the destruction of their houses sparked a rapid exodus of the Christian population, with some fleeing to Syria and Turkey, and others were given shelter in churches and monasteries.

On 10 June 2014, the Islamic State captured Mosul during the June 2014 Northern Iraq offensive. , after the Iraqi troops stationed there withdrew. Troop shortages and infighting among top officers and Iraqi political leaders played into IS's hands and fueled panic that led to the city's abandonment. Half a million people escaped on foot or by car during the next two days. According to western and pro-Iraqi government press, Mosul residents were de facto prisoners, forbidden to leave the city unless they left IS a significant collateral of family members, personal wealth and property. They could then leave after paying a significant "departure tax" for a three-day pass (for a higher fee they could surrender their home, pay the fee and leave for good) and if those with a three-day pass failed to return within that time, their assets would be seized and their family killed. By August, the city's new IS administration was dysfunctional, with frequent power cuts, a tainted water supply, collapse of infrastructure, and failing health care.

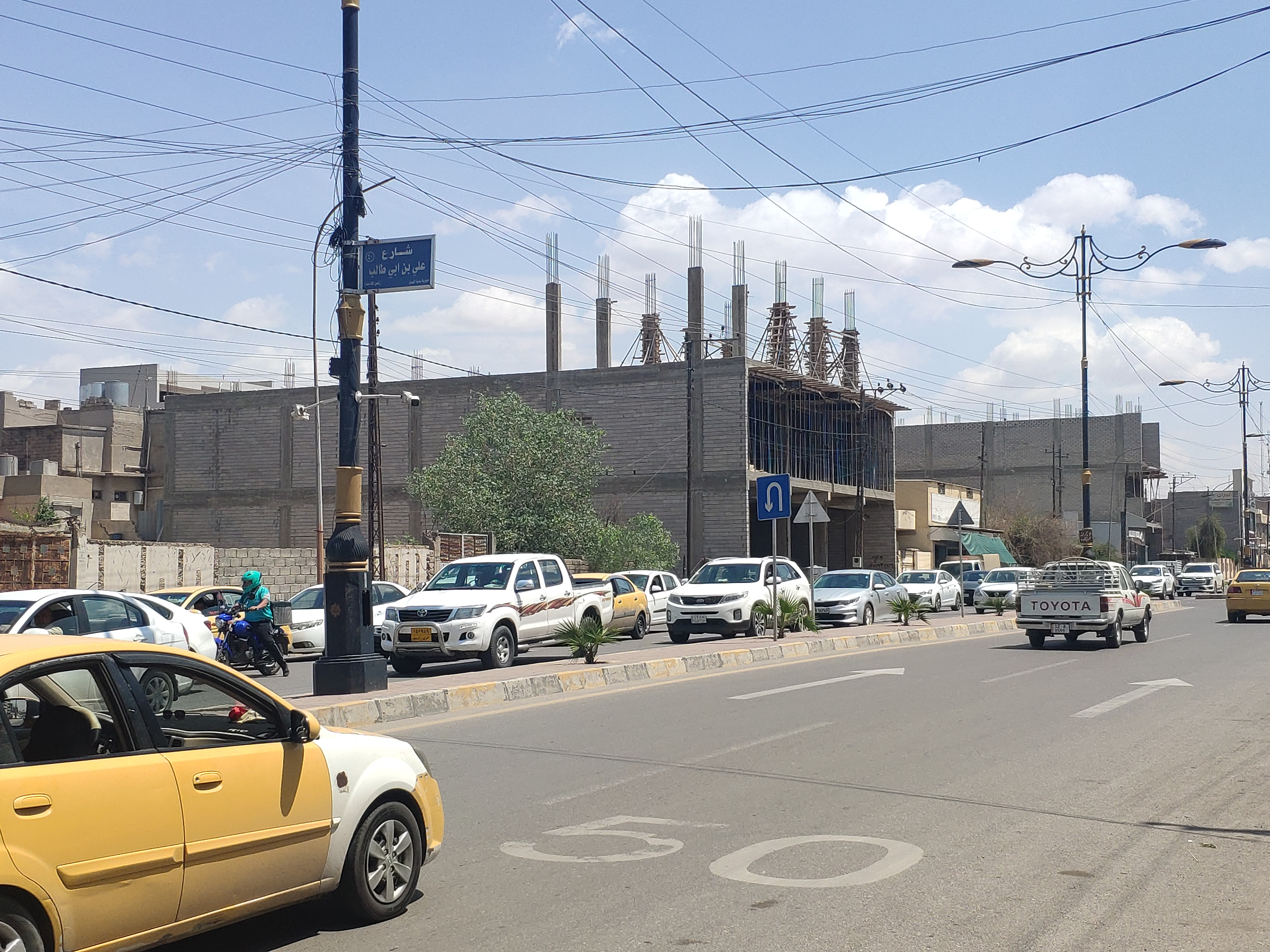
A modern-day city scene in Mosul

After more than two years of occupation of Mosul, Iraqi forces, with the help of American and French forces, launched a joint offensive to recapture it on 16 October 2016. The battle was considered key in the military intervention against IS. A military offensive to retake the city was the largest deployment of Iraqi forces since the 2003 invasion by U.S. and coalition forces On 9 July 2017, Prime Minister Haider Al-Abadi arrived in preparation to announce the full liberation and reclamation of Mosul after three years of IS control. A formal declaration was made on the next day. The battle continued for another couple of weeks in the Old City before Iraqi forces regained full control of Mosul on 21 July 2017.

== Demographics ==
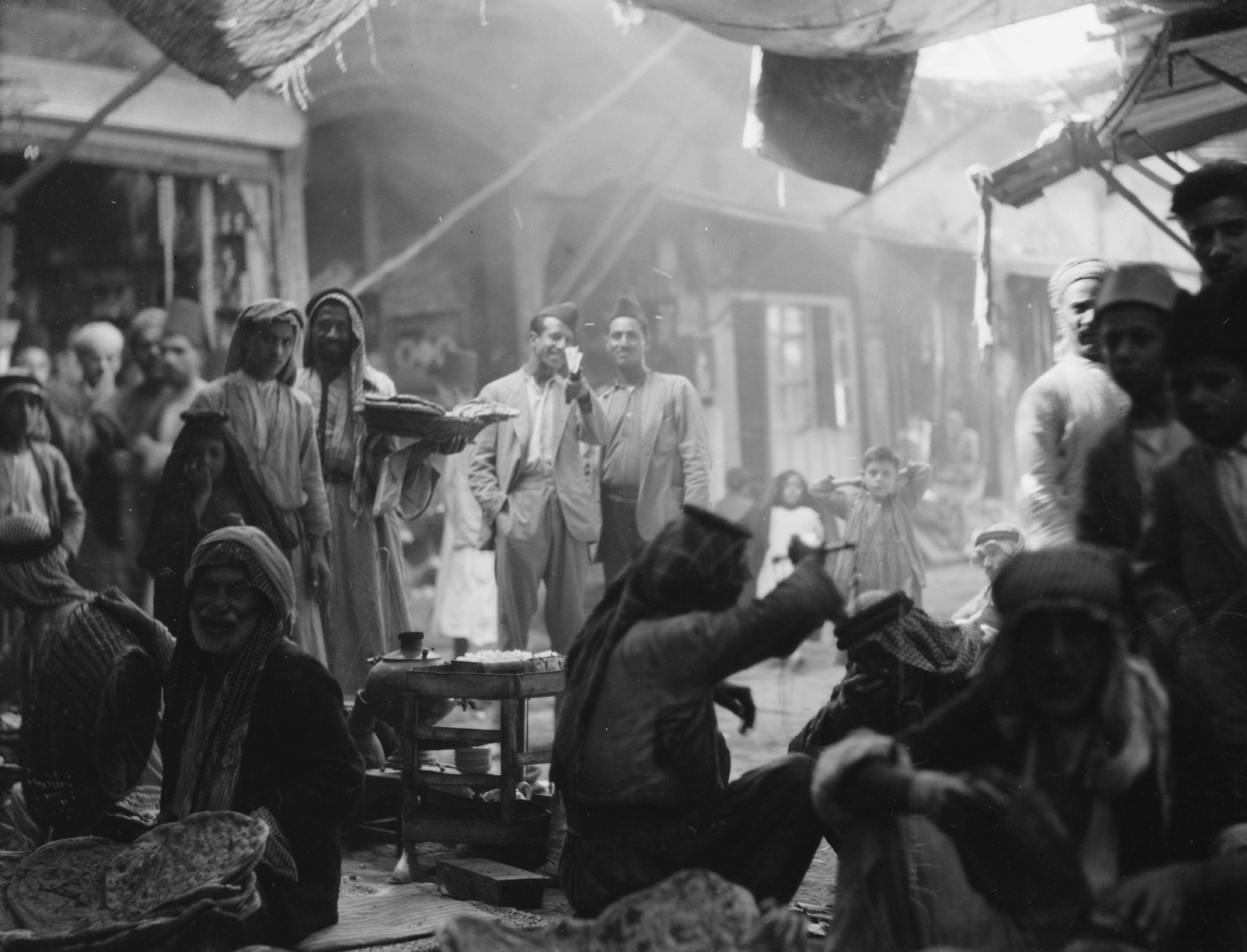
A souk (traditional market) in Mosul, 1932

According to Salahuddin Khuda Bakhsh, the Arab geographer Ibn Hawqal was at Mosul in 969 AD (358 AH) He called it a "fine town with excellent markets, surrounded by fertile districts of which the most celebrated was that round Nineveh where the Prophet Jonah was buried. In the tenth century, the population consisted of Kurds and Arabs, and the numerous districts round Mosul, occupying all Diyar Rabi'a, are carefully enumerated by Ibn Hawkal."

In the 20th century, Mosul was indicative of Iraq's mingling ethnic and religious cultures

Today Mosul has a Sunni Arab majority in urban areas, such as downtown Mosul west of the Tigris; across the Tigris and further north in the suburban areas, thousands of Assyrians, Kurds, Turkmens, Shabaks, Yazidis, Armenians and Mandeans made up the rest of Mosul's population. Shabaks were concentrated on the city's eastern outskirts.

=== Religion ===
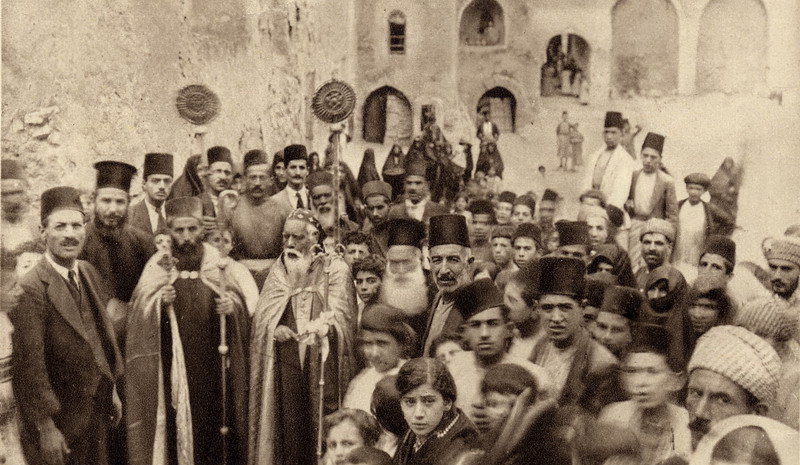
Celebration at the Syriac Orthodox Monastery in Mosul, early 20th century

Mosul has a predominantly Sunni Muslim population. The city also had an ancient Jewish population. Like their counterparts elsewhere in Iraq, most were forced out in 1950–51. Most Iraqi Jews have moved to Israel, and some to the United States. In 2003, during the Iraq War, a rabbi in the American army found an abandoned, dilapidated synagogue in Mosul dating to the 13th century.

During IS's occupation, religious minorities were targeted to convert to Islam, pay tribute (jizya) money, leave, or be killed. The persecution of Christians in Mosul and the surrounding Nineveh Plains removed a Christian community that had been present in the region since the 1st century.

== Infrastructure ==
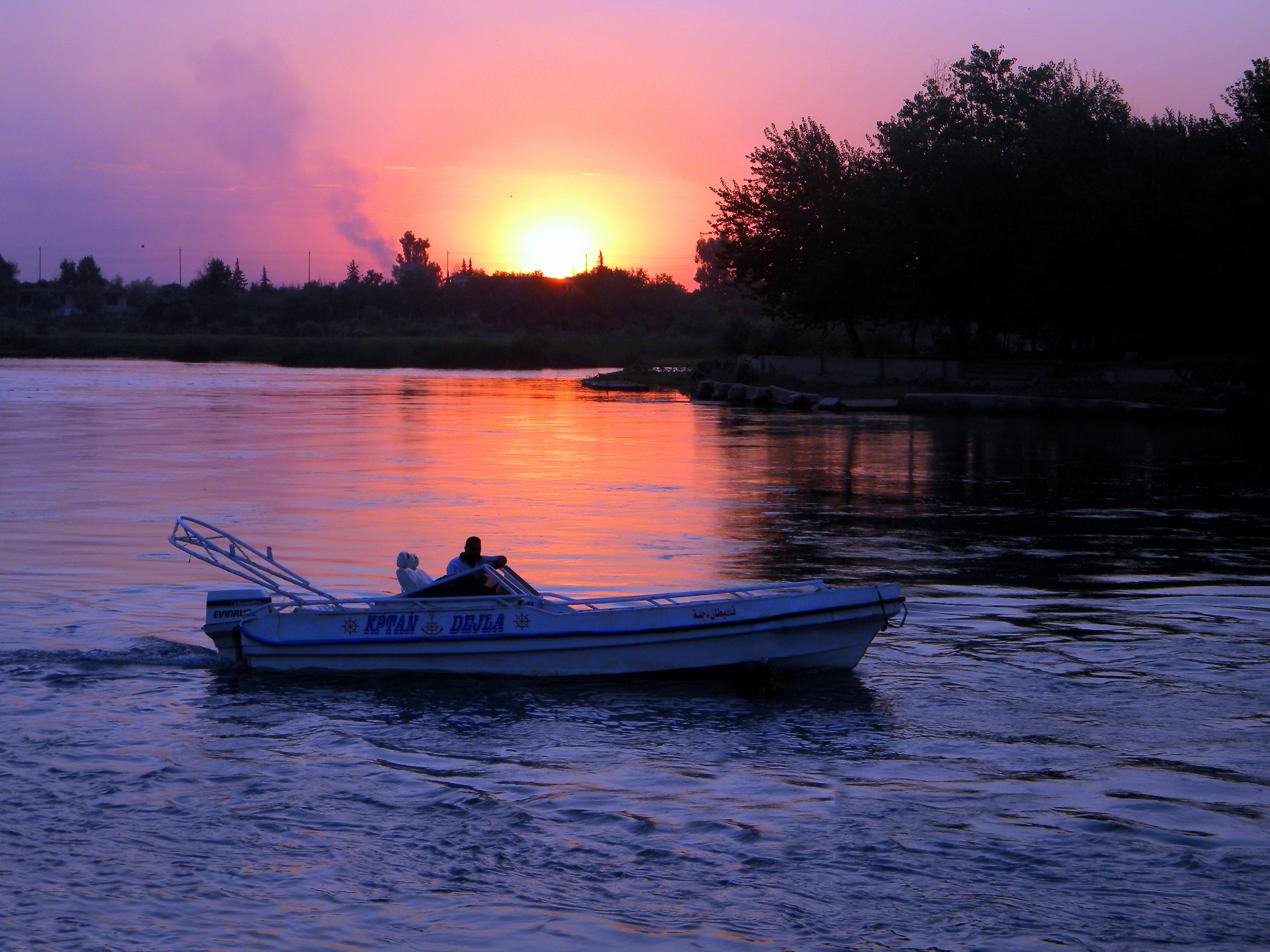
View of the Tigris river in Mosul

The Mosul Dam was built in the 1980s to supply Mosul with hydroelectricity and water. Despite this, water supply cuts are still common.

Five bridges cross the Tigris in Mosul, known from north to south as:

- Al Shohada Bridge (or "Third Bridge")
- Fifth Bridge
- Old Bridge (or "Iron Bridge", or "First Bridge")
- Al Huriya Bridge (literally "Freedom Bridge", also known as "Second Bridge")
- Fourth Bridge

During the Battle of Mosul (2016–17) between IS and the Iraqi Army supported by an international coalition, two bridges were 'damaged' by coalition airstrikes in October 2016, two others in November, and the Old Bridge was 'disabled' in early December. According to the news lmed, in late December the bridges were targeted to disrupt the resupply of IS forces in East Mosul from West Mosul. In January 2017, CNN reported that IS itself had 'destroyed' all bridges to slow the Iraqi ground troops' advance.

Mosul is served by Mosul International Airport.

== Economy ==
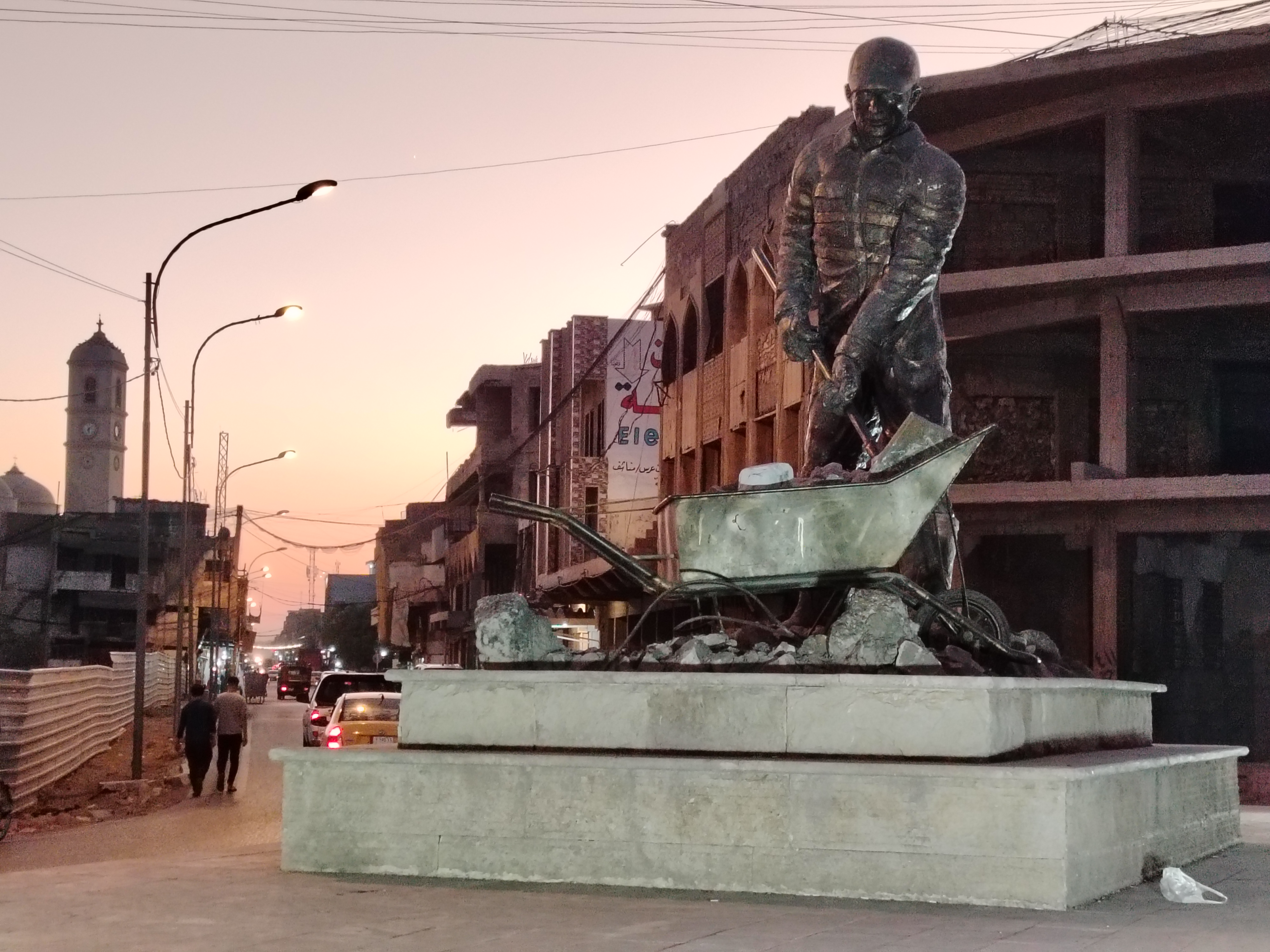
Downtown Mosul at night

Mosul, the second largest city in Iraq, was historically one of the most important commercial and industrial centers, contributing significantly to the economy of Iraq. The region having natural resources, it became a key contributor to the national economy and Iraq's industrial and agricultural sectors. The economy was based on a mix of oil, agriculture, industrial products, and minerals. Its strategic location and presence of airport, made Mosul an important city before the war in Iraq in 2013.

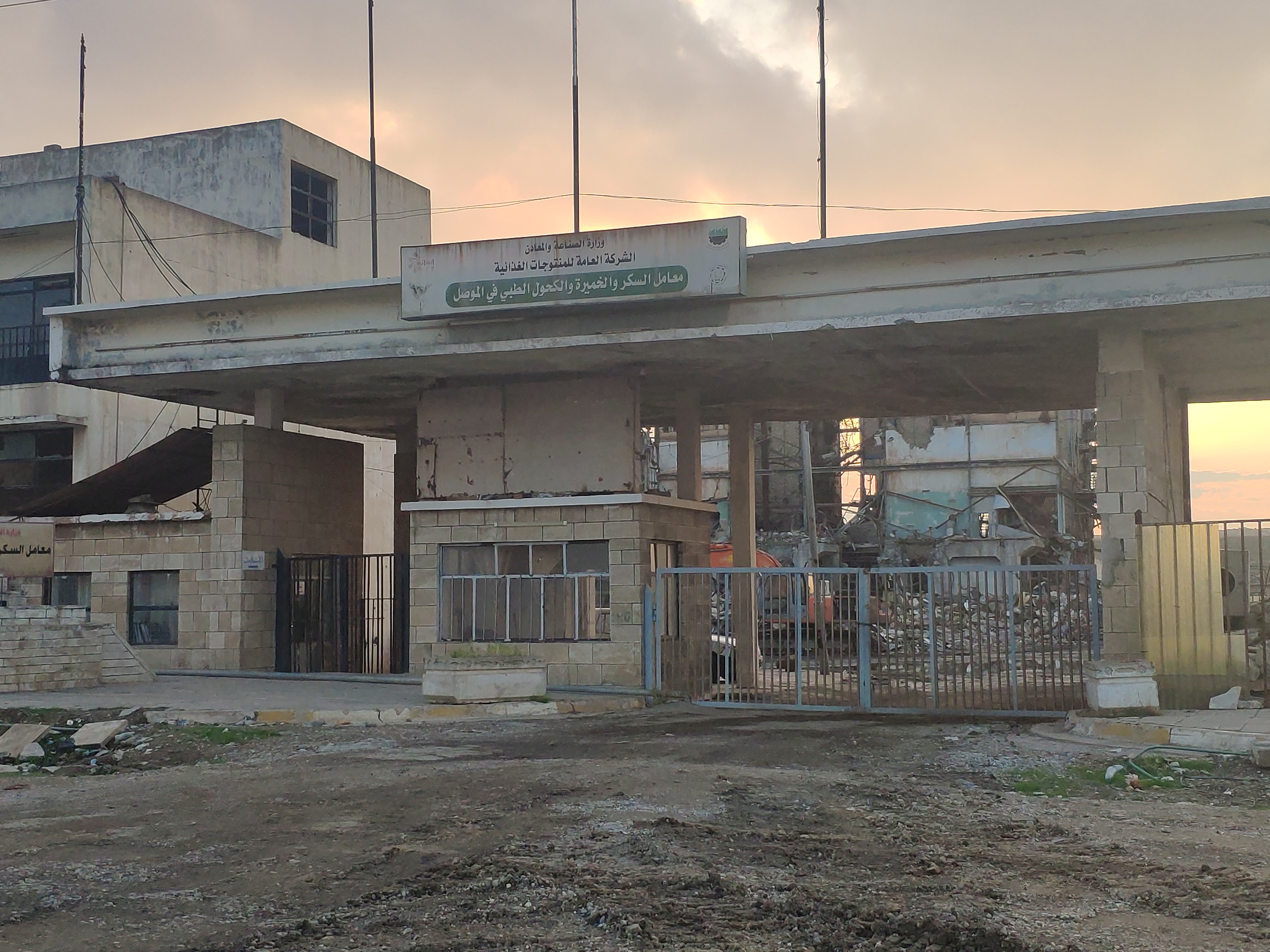
Old Sugar factory, south of the Ghazlani district

The city is known for sulfur reserves, particularly from the Meshraq Sulfur Plant, which had an annual production capacity of one million tons of sulfur. It was home to one of Iraq's largest sugar plants, fed by sugarcane grown in the region. The city was formerly a hub of cement production, with over 1,000 factories manufacturing cement and concrete masonry units (CMU). Additionally, Mosul had a growing oil and gas sector, with number of oil wells around the city.

Agriculturally, Mosul contributed significantly to Iraq's wheat supply, with fertile lands surrounding the city.

During the IS occupation, large reserves of sulfur from the plant fell under the militants' control and the plant was damaged during the US-led coalition airstrikes. Mosul's economy suffered during the conflict and many of the industries have yet fully to recover. The Kurdistan Region has historically been a major importer of Mosul's natural resources, forming a close relationship between the two regions. Years before IS took control of Mosul, extremist groups like Al-Qaeda and their allies had already started to gain influence over the city's administration and economy, laying the groundwork for the economic instability that would follow. When IS seized Mosul in June 2014, they looted the city's central bank, destroyed local businesses, and forcibly extracted money from business owners and farmers to fund their operations. As a result, the city's economy collapsed. Many businesses were forced to close, leading to skyrocketing unemployment and increasing poverty levels.

Reconstruction has since the end of the war become a multi-million dollar industry. To this day, large parts of the city are either being rebuilt or remain in ruins.

== Geography ==
Mosul stands 223 meters above sea level in the Upper Mesopotamia region of the Middle East. To the south west of Mosul is the Syrian Desert and to the East is the Zagros Mountains. It is surrounded by the Nineveh Plains.

=== Climate ===
Mosul has a hot semi-arid climate (BSh), verging on the Mediterranean climate (Csa), with extremely hot, prolonged, dry summers, brief mild transitional seasons, and moderately wet (and occasionally snowy), relatively cool winters.

Climate data for Mosul (1991–2020)
Month	Jan	Feb	Mar	Apr	May	Jun	Jul	Aug	Sep	Oct	Nov	Dec	Year
Record high °C (°F)	21.2 (70.2)	26.9 (80.4)	31.8 (89.2)	36.5 (97.7)	43.2 (109.8)	47.4 (117.3)	49.4 (120.9)	49.3 (120.7)	46.5 (115.7)	42.2 (108.0)	32.5 (90.5)	28.4 (83.1)	49.4 (120.9)
Mean daily maximum °C (°F)	13.1 (55.6)	15.4 (59.7)	20.0 (68.0)	25.9 (78.6)	33.2 (91.8)	39.8 (103.6)	43.4 (110.1)	43.3 (109.9)	38.5 (101.3)	31.9 (89.4)	21.6 (70.9)	15.1 (59.2)	28.4 (83.2)
Daily mean °C (°F)	7.4 (45.3)	9.3 (48.7)	13.3 (55.9)	18.5 (65.3)	25.1 (77.2)	31.5 (88.7)	34.8 (94.6)	34.1 (93.4)	28.8 (83.8)	22.2 (72.0)	14.8 (58.6)	9.6 (49.3)	20.8 (69.4)
Mean daily minimum °C (°F)	2.6 (36.7)	3.8 (38.8)	7.5 (45.5)	11.5 (52.7)	16.6 (61.9)	21.7 (71.1)	25.4 (77.7)	24.8 (76.6)	20.0 (68.0)	14.6 (58.3)	7.9 (46.2)	4.1 (39.4)	13.4 (56.1)
Record low °C (°F)	−17.6 (0.3)	−12.3 (9.9)	−5.8 (21.6)	−4.0 (24.8)	1.8 (35.2)	6.8 (44.2)	11.6 (52.9)	12.9 (55.2)	8.9 (48.0)	−2.6 (27.3)	−6.1 (21.0)	−15.4 (4.3)	−17.6 (0.3)
Average precipitation mm (inches)	61.6 (2.43)	53.9 (2.12)	59.4 (2.34)	46.1 (1.81)	17.5 (0.69)	1.2 (0.05)	0.2 (0.01)	0.0 (0.0)	0.6 (0.02)	12.7 (0.50)	41.7 (1.64)	61.9 (2.44)	356.8 (14.05)
Average precipitation days	11	11	12	9	6	0	0	0	0	5	7	10	71
Average relative humidity (%)	79.0	73.0	66.3	62.1	44.2	29.3	26.2	27.4	32.0	43.8	63.1	76.5	51.9
Mean monthly sunshine hours	158	165	192	210	310	363	384	369	321	267	189	155	3,083
Percentage possible sunshine	54	56	58	61	73	84	86	87	86	79	65	53	70
Average ultraviolet index	2	3	5	7	9	11	11	10	8	5	3	2	6
Source 1: World Meteorological Organisation (precipitation days 1976–2008)
Source 2: Weatherbase (extremes only), Meteomanz(extremes since 2009) and Weather Atlas (uv index)

== Historical and religious buildings ==
Mosul is rich in old historical places and ancient buildings: mosques, castles, churches, monasteries, and schools, many of which have architectural features and decorative work of significance. The town centre is dominated by a maze of streets and 19th-century houses. The markets are known for the mixture of people who jostle there: Arabs, Kurds, Assyrians, Iraqi Jews, Iraqi Turkmens, Armenians, Yazidi, Mandeans, Romani and Shabaks.

The Mosul Museum contains many finds from the ancient sites of the old Assyrian capital cities Nineveh and Nimrud. It is laid-out around a courtyard and with a façade of Mosul marble containing displays of Mosul life depicted in tableau form. On 26 February 2015, IS militants destroyed the museum's ancient Assyrian artifacts.

The English writer Agatha Christie lived in Mosul while her second husband, Max Mallowan, an archaeologist, was involved in the excavation in Nimrud.

=== Mosques and shrines ===
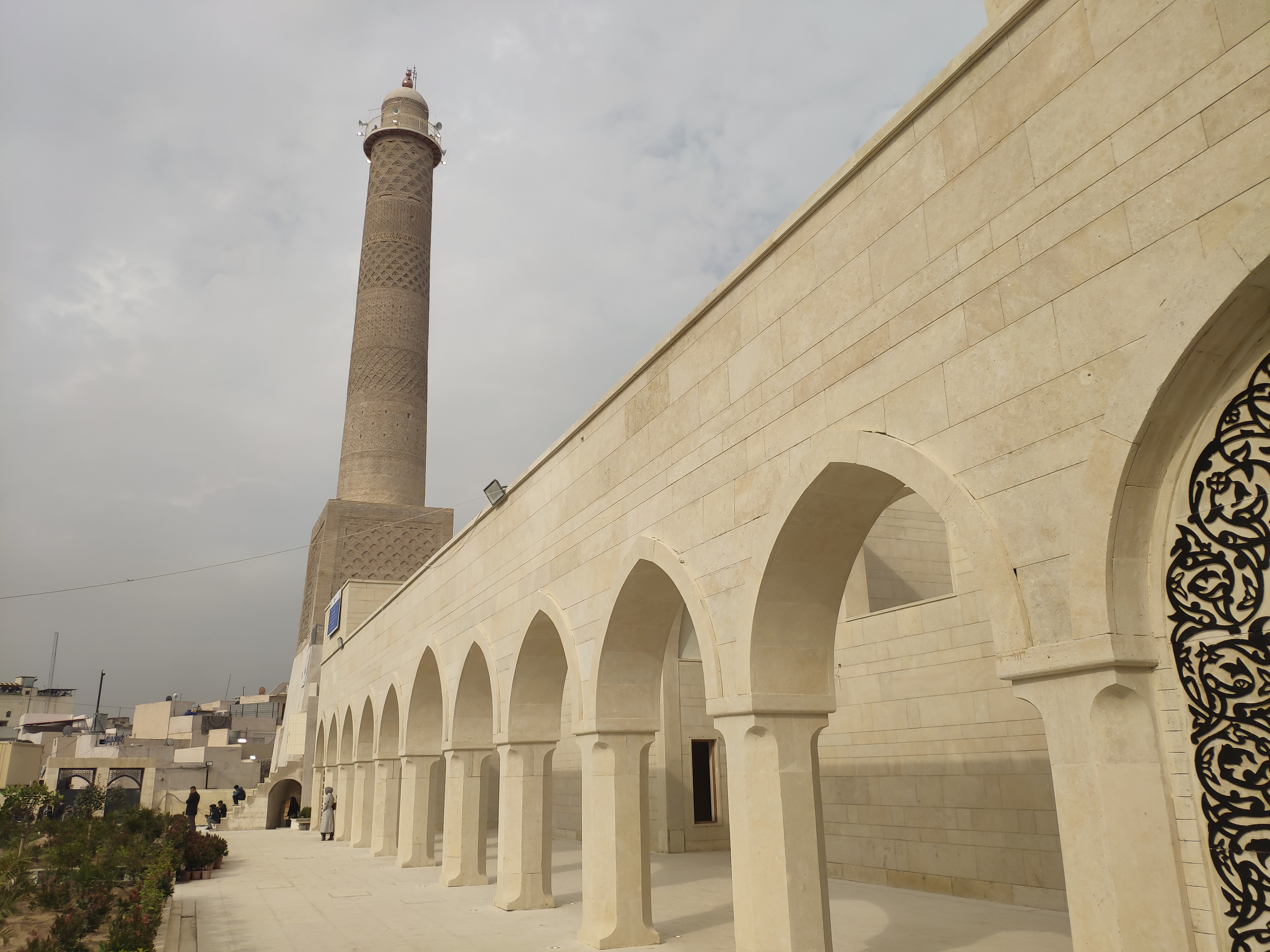
Great Mosque of al-Nuri after its reconstruction with its Al-Hadba minaret.

- Great Mosque of al-Nuri: Originally built by Nur al-Din Zengi circa 1172 AD. Ibn Battuta found a marble fountain there and a mihrab (the niche that indicates the direction of Mecca) with a Kufic inscription. Its decorated brickwork minaret, called al-Hadba ("the hunchback") due to its lean, was destroyed along with much of the mosque in 2017. The building has since been reconstructed and was reopened 2025.
- Mosul Grand Mosque is an unfinished mosque, which would become the largest mosque in Mosul.
- Mujahidi Mosque: The mosque dates back to 12th century AD, and is distinguished for its shen dome and elaborately wrought mihrab.
- Prophet Younis Mosque and Shrine: Located east of the city, and included the tomb of Prophet Younis (Jonah), dating back to the 8th century BC, with a tooth of the whale that swallowed and later released him. It was completely demolished by IS in July 2014.
- Prophet Jirjis Mosque and Shrine: The late 14th century mosque and shrine honoring Prophet Jirjis (George) was built over the Quraysh cemetery. It was destroyed by IS in July 2014.
- Prophet Daniel Shrine: A Tomb attributed to Prophet Daniel was destroyed by IS in July 2014.
- Hamou Qado (Hema Kado) Mosque: An Ottoman-era mosque in the central Maydan area built in 1881, and officially named Mosque of Abdulla Ibn Chalabi Ibn Abdul-Qadi. It was destroyed by IS in March 2015 because it contained a tomb that was revered and visited by local Muslims on Thursdays and Fridays.

=== Churches and monasteries ===
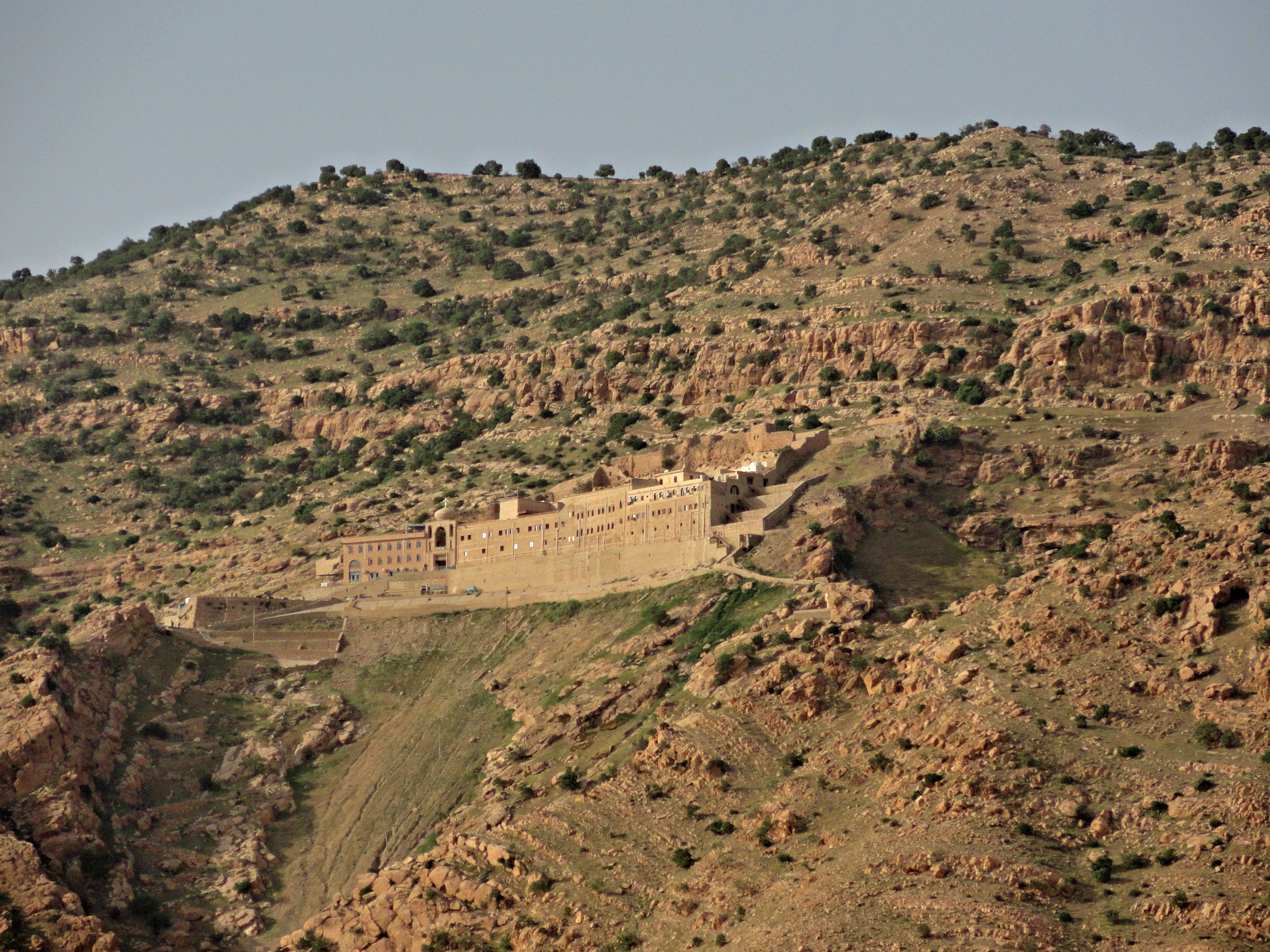
Mar Mattai Monastery of the Syriac Orthodox Church

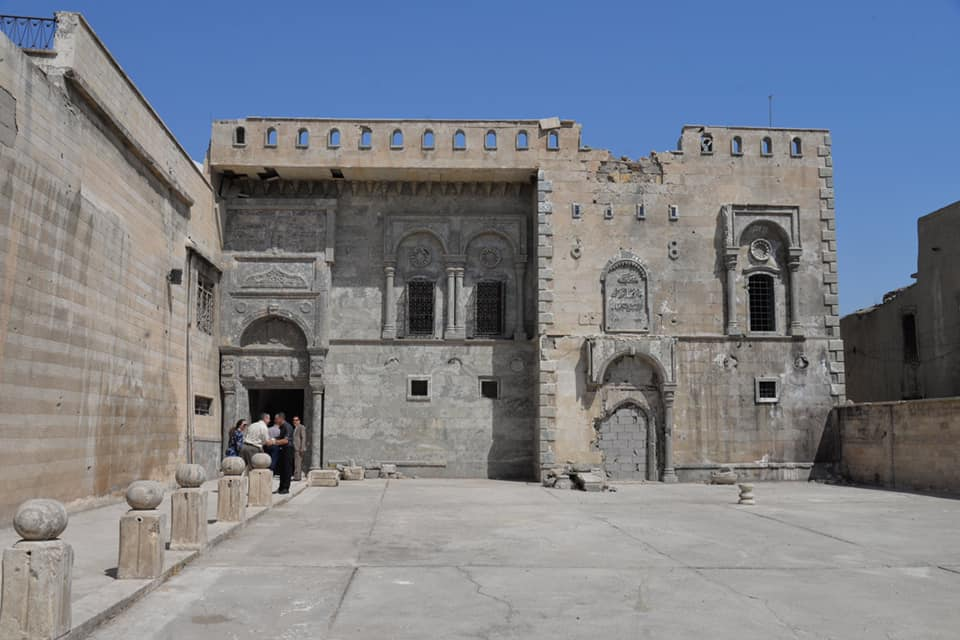
Church of Saint Thomas, Mosul

Mosul has the highest proportion of Assyrian Christians of all the Iraqi cities outside of the Kurdish region, and contains several interesting old churches, some of which originally date back to the early centuries of Christianity. Its ancient Assyrian churches are often hidden and their entrances in thick walls are not easy to find. Some of them have suffered from excessive restoration.

- Shamoun Al-Safa (St. Peter, Mar Petros): This church dates from the 13th century is and named after Shamoun Al-Safa or St. Peter (Mar Petros in Assyrian Aramaic). Earlier it had the name of the two Apostles, Peter and Paul, and was inhabited by the nuns of the Sacred Hearts.
- Church of St. Thomas (Mar Touma in Assyrian Aramaic): One of the oldest historical churches, named after St. Thomas the Apostle who preached the Gospel in the East, including India.
- Mar Petion Church: Mar Petion, educated by his cousin in a monastery, was martyred in 446 AD. It is the first Chaldean Catholic church in Mosul, after the union of many Assyrians with Rome in the 17th century. It dates back to the 10th century, and lies 3 m below street level. This church suffered destruction, and it has been reconstructed many times. A hall was built on one of its three parts in 1942. As a result, most of its artistic features have been severely damaged.
- Ancient Tahira Church (The Immaculate): Near Bash Tapia, considered one of the most ancient churches in Mosul. No evidence helps to determine its exact area. It could be either the remnants of the church of the Upper Monastery or the ruined Mar Zena Church. Al-Tahira Church dates back to the 7th century, and it lies 3 m below street level. Reconstructed last in 1743.
- Al-Tahera Church: Syriac Catholic Church completed in 1862.
- Mar Hudeni Church: It was named after Mar Ahudemmeh (Hudeni) Maphrian of Tikrit who was martyred in 575 AD. Mar Hudeni is an old church of the Tikritans in Mosul. It dates back to the 10th century, lies 7 m below street level and was first reconstructed in 1970. People can get mineral water from the well in its yard. The chain, fixed in the wall, is thought to cure epileptics.
- St. George's Monastery (Mar Gurguis): One of the oldest churches in Mosul, named after St. George, located to the north of Mosul, was probably built late in the 17th century. Pilgrims from different parts of the North visit it yearly in the spring, when many people also go out to its whereabouts on holiday. It is about 6 m below street level. A modern church was built over the old one in 1931, abolishing much of its archeological significance. The only monuments left are a marble door-frame decorated with a carved Estrangelo (Syriac) inscription, and two niches, which date back to the 13th or 14th century.
- Mar Matte: situated about 20 km (12 mi) east of Mosul on the top of a high mountain (Mount Maqloub).
- Monastery of Mar Behnam: Also called Deir Al-Jubb (The Cistern Monastery) and built in the 12th or 13th century, it lies in the Nineveh Plain near Nimrud about 32 km (20 mi) southwest of Mosul.
- St. Elijah's Monastery (Dair Mar Elia): Dating from the 6th century, it was the oldest Christian Monastery in Iraq, until its destruction by IS in January 2016.

Other Christian historical buildings:

- The Roman Catholic Church (built by the Dominican Fathers in Nineveh Street in 1893)
- Mar Michael
- Mar Elias
- Mar Oraha
- Rabban Hormizd Monastery, the monastery of Notre-Dame des Semences, near the Assyrian town of Alqosh

=== Other sites ===
- Bash Tapia Castle: A ruined castle rising high over the Tigris, which was one of the few remnants of Mosul's old walls until it was blown up by IS in 2015.
- Qara Saray (The Black Palace): The remnants of the 13th-century palace of Sultan Badruddin Lu'lu'.
- Ashur Mall is the largest mall of Mosul, based on Assyrian architecture

== Education ==
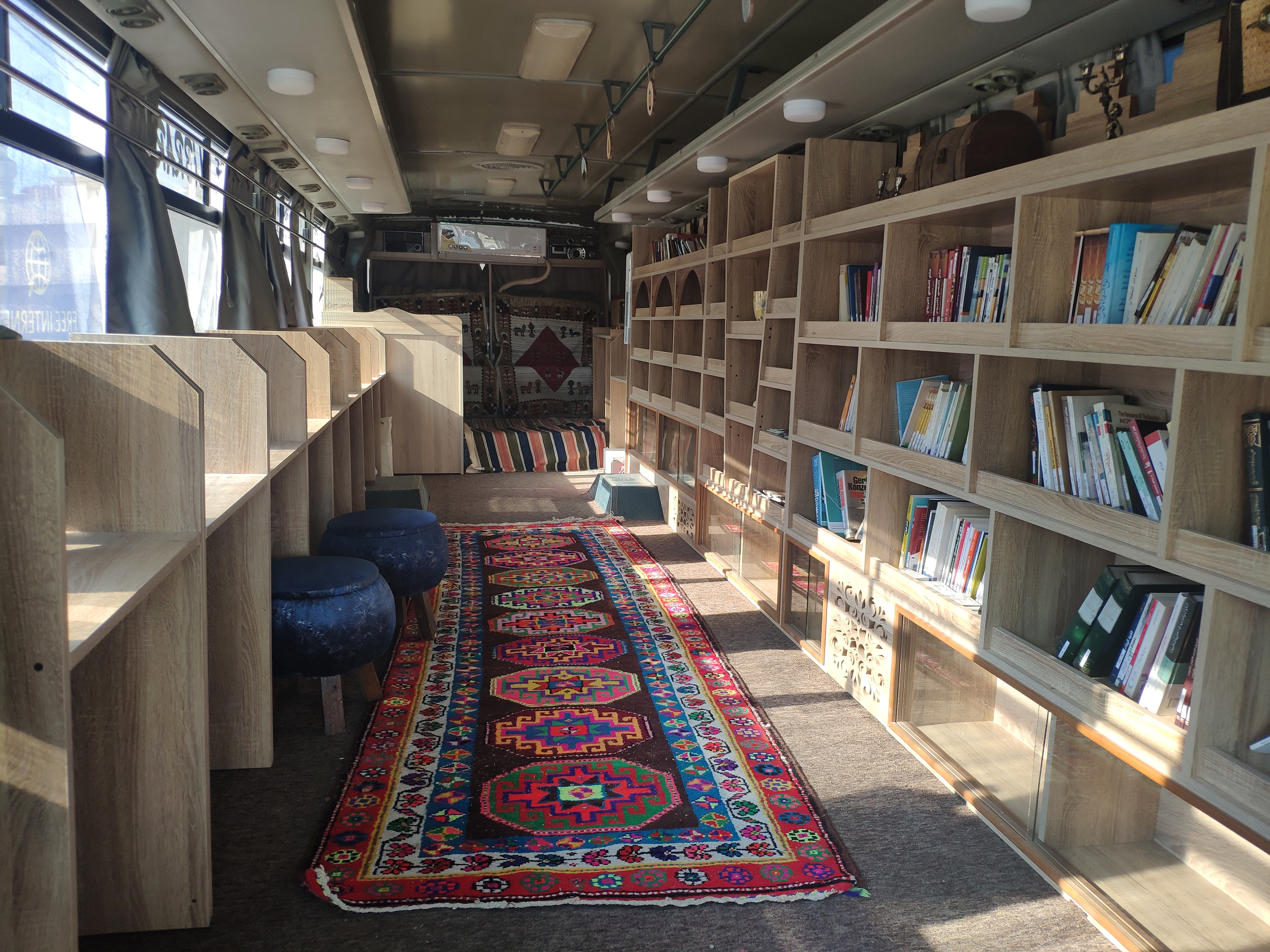
A mobile library in Mosul

The University of Mosul is the largest university in Mosul. Other schools of higher education include Ninevah University, Al-Hadbaa University College, and the Northern Technical University.

Mosul also has multiple high schools some of which are coeducational while others are gender segregated. These include but are not limited to:

- Al-Hafsah School
- Al-Haj Secondary School for Girls
- Kourtoba High School for Girls
- Al-Mouhobeen Secondary School for Boys and Girls
- Al-Mustaqbal High School for Boys
- Al-Mutamaizat High School for Girls
- Al-Mutamaizeen High School for Boys
- Al-Resalah Al-Islamia (Al-Resalah) High School for Boys
- Al-Sharqiya High School for Boys

== Sport ==
The city has one football team capable of competing in the top-flight of Iraqi football – Mosul FC.

Al Mosul University Stadium is the home stadium to Mosul FC and can hold up to 20,000 people.

Mosul university Stadium

The University of Mosul contains a College of Physical Education and Sports Science which teaches undergraduate and graduate students and performs research in three scientific departments.

== Media ==
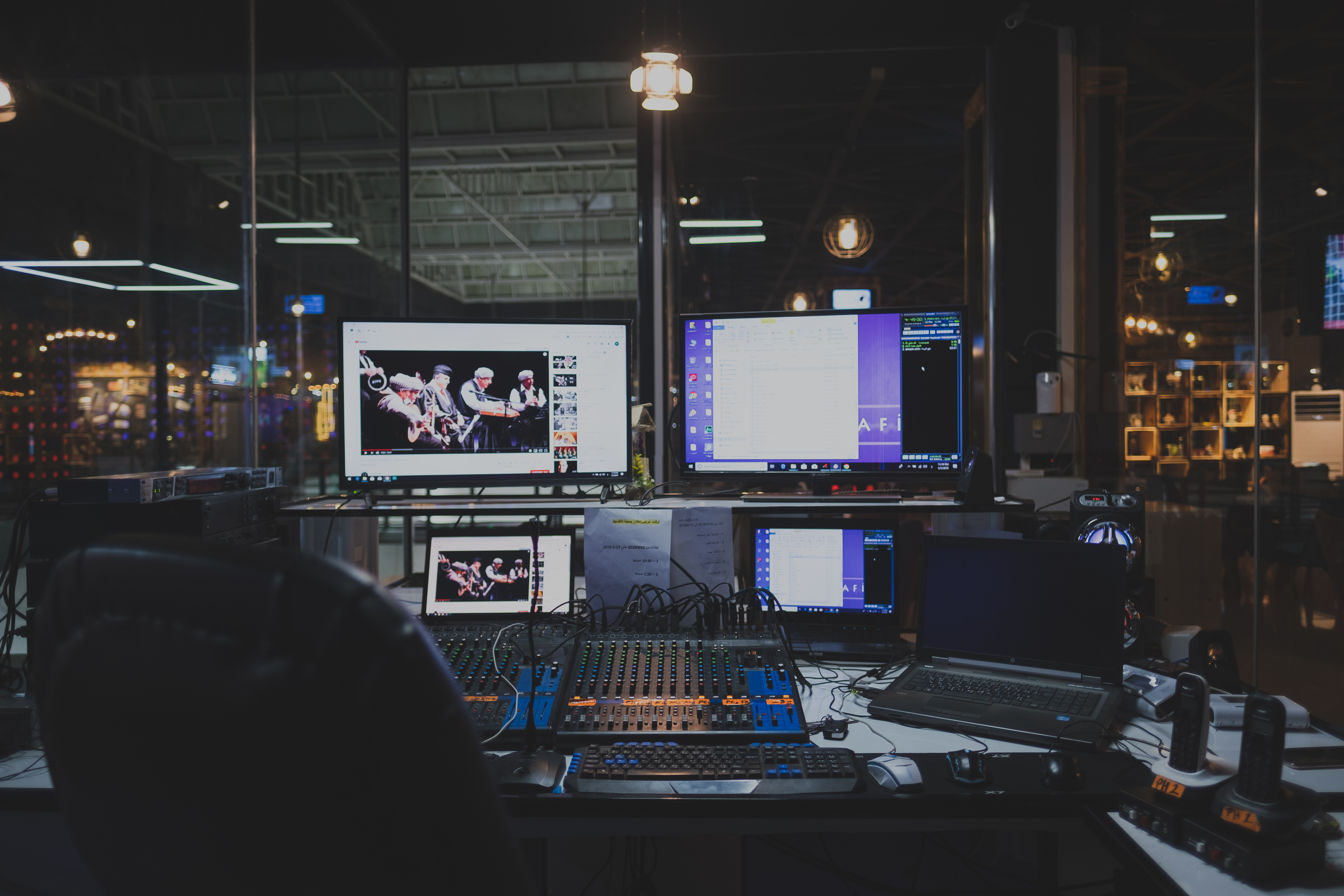
Mosul's OneFM Radio Cafe 05

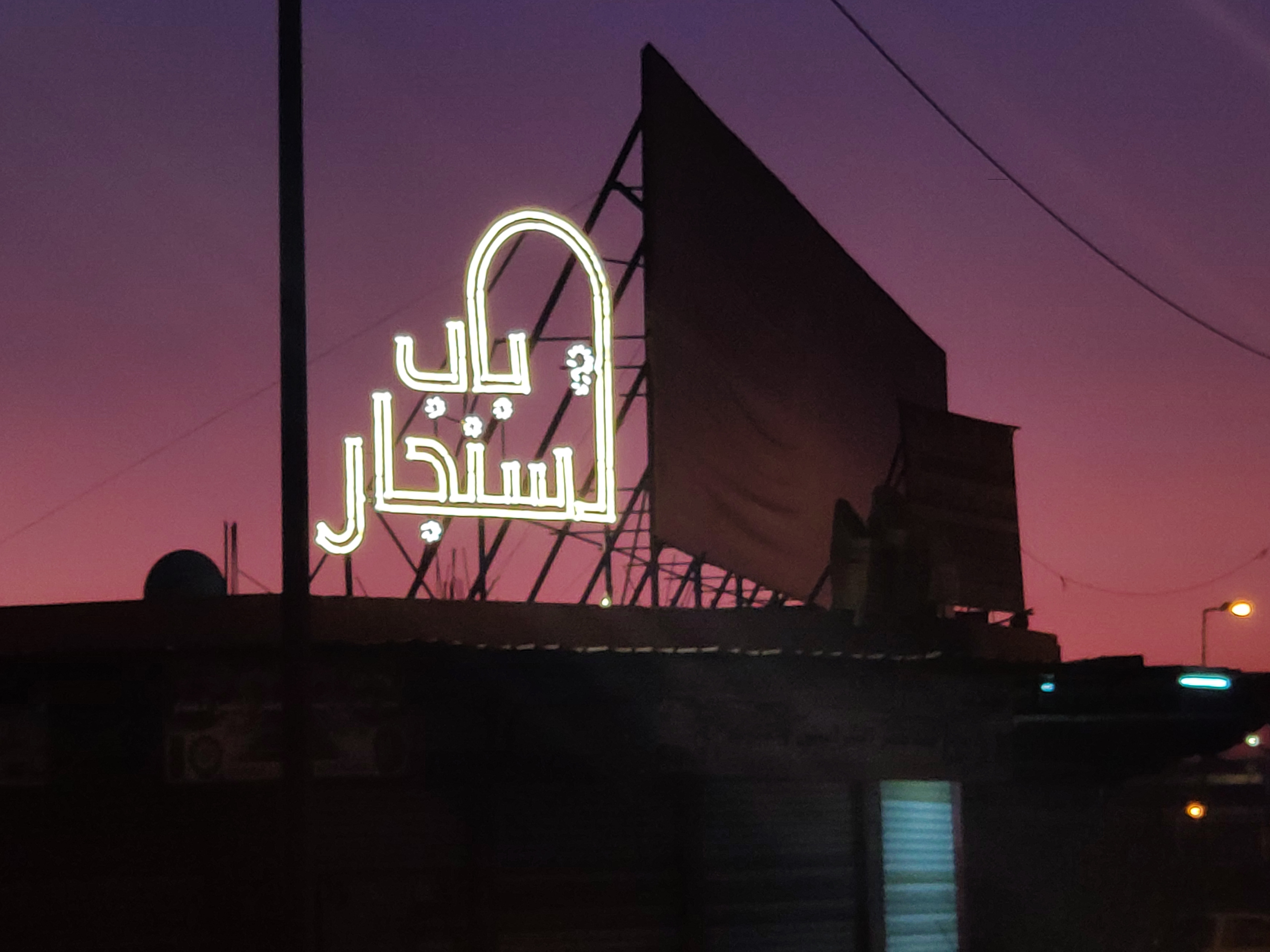
Bab Sinjar in downtown Mosul

=== Newspapers ===
- Ash-Shabibah, a defunct daily newspaper

== Notable people ==
- Abdulahad AbdulNour (1888–1948), physician and humanitarian
- Thabit AbdulNour (1890–1957), Iraqi Politician, government Administrator, and diplomat
- Zaha Hadid, noted architect and first woman to win the Pritzker award, was named Dame by Queen Elizabeth II.
- Al Jalili, Hussein Pasha, raised and led army to defend Mosul against the Iranian Shah Nadir Shah, 1743.
- Al Jalili, Ismael, Eye doctor who discovered and researched the Jalili syndrome.
- Al Jamil, Sayyar, historian and political analyst.
- Abu Al Soof, Behnam (1931–2012), Archeologist, anthropologist, historian and writer of Christian origin.
- Tariq Aziz, Assyrian Deputy Prime Minister 1979–2003 (real name Michael Youkhanna) (from Tel Keppe)
- Munir Bashir (1930–1997), Assyrian musician, who had several successes in the Middle East during the 20th century
- Asenath Barzani, first Jewish female rabbi
- Vian Dakhil (born 1971), Yazidi member of the Iraqi parliament.
- Hawar Mulla Mohammed (born 1971), Kurdish Iraqi soccer player for the national team
- Paulos Faraj Rahho (1942–2008), Assyrian Chaldean Catholic Archbishop of Mosul, assassinated in the 2008
- Taha Yassin Ramadan (1938–2007), Former Vice President of Iraq
- Hormuzd Rassam (1826–1910), Assyrian archaeologist and diplomat of the 19th century
- Kathem Al Saher (born 1957), Arab Iraqi pop singer, songwriter, actor, and musician
- Adnan Koucher, Iraqi scholar
- Salah al-Din al-Sabbagh (1889–1945), Arab Iraqi Army officer
- Salah Salim Ali, Norwegian Iraqi Writer and translator, author of Ibsen i Arabia.
- Ignatius Gabriel I Tappouni (1879–1968), Assyrian Patriarch of Antioch and all east for the Syriac Catholic Church between 1929 and 1968, Church Father of the Second Vatican Council and the first Eastern Rite prelate to be raised to the College of Cardinals since the reign of Pope Pius IX
- Behnam Afas (born 1934), Iraqi-New Zealander author and researcher into the role of Christian scholars and missionaries
- Ghazi Mashal Ajil al-Yawer (born 1958), Arab Interim President of Iraq during 2004–05
- Ignatius Zakka I (1931–2014), Assyrian Patriarch of Antioch and all east for the Syriac Orthodox Church
- Omar Mohammed (born 1986), historian and citizen journalist, creator of the Mosul Eye news blog.
- Loris Ohannes Chobanian (1933–2023), Armenian-American composer and professor at Baldwin Wallace University

== See also ==
- List of largest cities of Iraq
- List of rulers of Mosul
- University of Mosul
- Iraq
- Nineveh Governorate
- Mosul District
- Assyrian homeland
- Asteroid 22292 Mosul named after the city in 2018
- Battle of Mosul (2016–2017)
- Chaldean Catholic Archeparchy of Mosul
- Mosul question
- Nineveh Plains

== Sources ==
- Humphreys, R. Stephen (1991). "Masūd b. Mawdūd b. Zangī". In Bosworth, C. E.; van Donzel, E. & Pellat, Ch. (eds.). The Encyclopaedia of Islam, Second Edition. Volume VI: Mahk–Mid. Leiden: E. J. Brill. pp. 780–782. ISBN 978-90-04-08112-3.
- Nasiri, Ali Naqi; Floor, Willem M. (2008). Titles and Emoluments in Safavid Iran: A Third Manual of Safavid Administration. Mage Publishers. p. 309. ISBN 978-1933823232.
- Oberling, P. (1984). "AFŠĀR". Encyclopaedia Iranica, Vol. I, Fasc. 6. pp. 582–586. Archived from the original on 29 April 2011.
- Rothman, E. Nathalie (2015). Brokering Empire: Trans-Imperial Subjects between Venice and Istanbul. Cornell University Press. ISBN 978-0801463129.
