= TCG Bayraktar =

TCG Bayraktar is the name of the following ships of the Turkish Navy:

- TCG Bayraktar (NL 120), ex-USS Saline County (LST-1101), a tank landing ship acquired in 1972
- TCG Bayraktar (L 402), a tank landing ship commissioned in 2018

== See also ==
- Bayraktar (disambiguation)
