= Bajraktarević =

Bajraktarević is a predominantly Bosnian surname, an occupational surname derived from bayraktar, a Turkish word meaning "flag-bearer". It is predominantly borne by ethnic Bosniaks, while the similar Barjaktarević is predominantly borne by ethnic Serbs.

Notable people with the surname include:

== People ==
- Dina Bajraktarević (born 1953), Bosnian singer
- Esmir Bajraktarevic (born 2005), American footballer of Bosnian descent
- Mahmut Bajraktarević (1909–1985), Bosnian mathematician
- Mirsada Bajraktarević (1951–1976), Bosnian singer
- Semir Bajraktarević (born 1987), Bosnian footballer
- Silvana Armenulić (born Zilha Bajraktarević; 1939–1976), Bosnian singer
- Téa Obreht (born Tea Bajraktarević) (born 1985), Serbian-American novelist

== See also ==
- Bayraktar (surname)
- Barjaktarević

Some Bajraktarević families from Montenegro and Bajraktari from Albania originate from Turkish clan Bayraktar that remained after the collapse of Ottoman Empire and due to local pressure localized their last name by adding vić in Montenegrin proper and i in Albanian proper. There are many Turkish families with similar situations e.g. Mehmedović and Mehmedi are from the same Turkish clan that remained in current Montenegro and Albania.
