= Qasem Sultan Afshar =

Safavid military leader and official during the reign of King (Shah) Abbas I

Qāsem Sultan Afshar or Qāsem Sultan Imānlū Afshar, was a Safavid military leader and official during the reign of King (Shah) Abbas I (r. 1588–1629).

== Biography ==
Qāsem Sultan was a member of the Imānlū branch of the Afshar tribe, one of the original Qizilbash tribes that had supplied power to the Safavids since its earliest days. During King Abbas I's early reign, Qāsem Sultan became the head of a group of Afshars whose duty it was to protect the marshes surrounding the city of Kermanshah. In the early 17th century, marked by wars against the archrivals of the Safavids — the Ottomans — Qāsem Sultan fought with great distinction, which earned him the governorshop of Mosul in 1622. However, shortly after, following the outbreak of a plague, he moved towards the western part of Azerbaijan with the rest of his tribe. He became the founder of the Afshar community of the city of Urmia. His son Kalb-e ʿAlī Beg (or Kalb' Ali Sultan Afshar) was appointed governor of Urmia in 1627-28, or 1630, until 1648. The descendants of both formed the Qāsemlū clan — named in honor of Qāsem Sultan.

== Sources ==
- Floor, Willem M. (2008). Titles and Emoluments in Safavid Iran: A Third Manual of Safavid Administration, by Mirza Naqi Nasiri. Washington, DC: Mage Publishers. p. 309. ISBN 978-1933823232.
- Newman, Andrew J. (2012). Safavid Iran: Rebirth of a Persian Empire. I.B.Tauris. ISBN 978-0857733665.
- Oberling, P. (1984). "AFŠĀR". Encyclopaedia Iranica, Vol. I, Fasc. 6. pp. 582–586. Archived from the original on 2011-04-29.
- Rothman, E. Nathalie (2015). Brokering Empire: Trans-Imperial Subjects between Venice and Istanbul. Cornell University Press. ISBN 978-0801463129.
