= Ash-Shabibah =

Ash-Shabibah (Arabic: الشبيبة, 'The Youth') was a communist daily newspaper published from Mosul, Iraq. The paper was forced to close in October 1960 as part of a government clampdown on the communist press. As of December 1960, there were reports that the editor of ash-Shabibah, Lt. Colonel Ahmad al-Hajj Ayyub, was facing trial for having defended (in an article in ash-Shabibah) the persons convicted by a military court for the Kirkuk events.
