= Barjaktarević =

Barjaktarević (Serbian Cyrillic: Барјактаревић) and "Barjaktarović" is a Serbo-Montenegrin-Croatian surname, an occupational surname derived from barjaktar, a term adopted by Serbs from the Turkism bayraktar, meaning "flag-bearer". It is predominantly borne by ethnic Serbs, while the related Bajraktarević is predominantly borne by ethnic Bosniaks. People with the surname are known to have joined both the Yugoslav Partisans and Chetniks. It may refer to:

- Vladimir "Vlada" Barjaktarević, former member of Serbian rock groups Riblja Čorba and Van Gogh
- Milić Barjaktarević, Yugoslav actor
- Milan Barjaktarevic (born 1987), Swedish footballer of Serbian descent
- Temeljko Barjaktarević (sr) (1882–1918), Serbian Chetnik vojvoda and participant in the Balkan Wars and World War I.
- Ljubivoje Barjaktarović (1866–1944), Serbian Division general until 1927. Fought in the 1912–18 wars. He was one of three officers who tried to inform the authorities of the Black Hand.
- Pavle Barjaktarević (1891–1956), Serbian Engineer-Brigade general. POW in 1941.
- Mirko P. Barjaktarević, Serbian historian.
- Milan P. Barjaktarević (1905–1981), Serbian ethnologist.
- Bojan Barjaktarević (born 1977), retired Serbian basketballer, played in Greece, Germany, Cyprus and Poland.
- Danilo Barjaktarević, Serbian linguist and academic.
- Milivoj Barjaktarević, Serbian consul in Budapest during King Aleksandar's reign.
- Miloje Barjaktarević, Serbian Orthodox prota in Kragujevac.
- Jadranka Barjaktarević, Montenegrin pop-folk singer.
- Bojana Barjaktarević, Serbian folk singer.
- Milijana Barjaktarević, Serbian author.
- Svetislav Barjaktarović, Serbian gynecologist.

== Sources ==
- Вукићевић, Даница; Ћирковић, Симо Ц (2006). Српска породична енциклопедија. Narodna knjiga. pp. 18–20. "Барјактаревић"
