= Mahmut Bajraktarević =

Bosnian mathematician and academician

Mahmut Bajraktarević (22 December 1909 in Sarajevo – 13 April 1985 in Bugojno) was a Bosnian mathematician and academician. He graduated from the University of Belgrade in 1933 and received his doctorate from the Sorbonne in 1953 with the dissertation Sur certaines suites itérées. Bajraktarević was a professor at the University of Sarajevo and had a great influence on the development of mathematics in Bosnia and Herzegovina. He contributed to the research areas of functional equations, iterative sequences and summability theory.
