= Alemdar =

Alemdar is a Turkish word originated from Persian word "علمدار(/ælæmdɑːr/)" meaning "standard-bearer". It may refer to:

== People ==
- Alemdar Mustafa Pasha (died 1808), Ottoman grand vizier of Albanian origin

== Other uses ==
- Alemdar (ship) a Turkish ship which is known for her activities in the Independence War of Turkey
- TCG Alemdar (A-601), submarine rescue mother ship of the Turkish Navy

== See also ==
- Bayraktar (surname)
