= Bayraktar (surname) =

Turkish surname

- Language: Turkish

Origin
- Language: Turkish
- Derivation: bayrak + دار / tar
- Meaning: "flag" + "owner"

Other names
- Alternative spelling: bajraktar

Bayraktar is a Turkish surname and word that consists of the Turkish word “bayrak" ('flag') and the Persian suffix دار. It means "flag-owner" or "flag-bearer". Derivative names include Bajraktarević and Bajraktaraj.

== People ==
Notable people with the surname or epithet include:

=== Bajraktari ===
- Muharrem Bajraktari (1896–1989), Albanian Muslim guerrilla fighter and political figure

=== Bayrakdar ===
- Faraj Bayrakdar (born 1951), Swedish-Syrian poet and writer
- Maha Bayrakdar (1947–2025), Syrian and Lebanese poet and artist

=== Bayraktar ===
- Selçuk Bayraktar (born 1979), Turkish UAV engineer and businessman
- Selim Bayraktar (born 1975), Turkish actor
- Ufukhan Bayraktar (born 1986), Turkish footballer
- Uluç Bayraktar (born 1974), Turkish film director
- Alemdar Mustafa Pasha (died 1808), also known as Bayraktar Mustafa Pasha, Ottoman grand vizier
- Erdoğan Bayraktar (born 1948), Turkish politician and former government minister
- Gülşen Bayraktar (born 1976), Turkish pop singer
- Hakan Bayraktar (born 1976), Turkish footballer
- Sami Bayraktar (born 1978), Turkish-Belgian futsal player

== See also ==
- Alemdar
