= Sami Bayraktar =

Turkish-Belgian futsal player

Sami Bayraktar (also known as Sammy Bayraktar in Belgium; born 1978) is a Turkish-Belgian futsal player. Sami Bayraktar currently plays for Alliance Ecaussines and played for Barca Ottignies between the 2003 and 2007 seasons.

He is a member of the Turkey national futsal team in the UEFA Futsal Championship.
