= Farid =

- Gender: Male
- Language: Arabic

Origin
- Origin: Middle Eastern
- Meaning: Unique

Other names
- Alternative spelling: Farid, Fareed, Ferid, Ferit
- Nickname: Farid
- Derived: Fard "Unique"
- Popularity: see popular names

Farid (Arabic: فَرِيد fariyd, farīd), Fareed, Ferid, Farit, or Férid, is a masculine given name and surname of Arabic origin meaning "unique, one-of-a-kind ("the One"), or incomparable". Notable people with the name include:

== Given name ==
=== Fareed ===
- Fareed Ahmad (cricketer) (born 1994), Afghan cricketer
- Fareed Ahmed (born 1989), Pakistani field hockey player
- Fareed Armaly (born 1957), American artist, curator, author, and editor
- Fareed Ayaz (born 1952), Pakistani qawwal
- Fareed Nawaz Baloch (1946–2001), Pakistani television and radio actor
- Fareed Haque (born 1963), American jazz guitarist
- Fareed al-Madhhan, Syrian Army officer
- Fareed Mahfooz Kidwai (born 1944), Indian politician
- Fareed Lafta, Iraqi pilot and athlete
- Fareed Majeed (born 1986), Iraqi footballer
- Fareed Majeed (footballer) (born 1974), Pakistani footballer
- Fareed Al-Marzouqi (born 1965), Emirati football referee
- Fareed Parbati (1961–2011), Indian poet and writer
- Fareed Ramadan (1961–2020), Bahraini novelist, screenwriter, and film producer
- Fareed Sadat (born 1998), Afghan footballer
- Fareed Ullah (born 2001), Pakistani footballer
- Fareed Mustafa Kamil Yasseen (born 1956), Iraqi physicist, politician, activist, and diplomat
- Fareed Zakaria (born 1964), American journalist and commentator
- Fareed Zargar, Afghan cricketer

=== Farid ===
- Farid Abbasov (born 1979), Azerbaijani chess grandmaster
- Farid Abboud (born 1951), Lebanese diplomat
- Farid Abedi (born 1977), Iranian footballer
- Farid F. Abraham (born 1937), American scientist
- Farid Agamoglanov (born 1994), Azerbaijani boxer and kickboxer
- Farid Ahmad (1923–1971), Pakistani politician and lawyer
- Farid Ahmadov (born 1979), Azerbaijani lawyer
- Farid Ahmed (judge) (born 1960), Bangladeshi judge
- Farid Ahmed (musician) (1960–2021), Bangladeshi composer and music director
- Farid Ahmed (politician), Bangladeshi politician
- Farid Ahmed (publisher), Bangladeshi publisher and television presenter
- Farid Akasheh (1921–2014), Jordanian politician
- Farid El Alagui (born 1985), French-Moroccan footballer
- Farid Alakbarli (1964–2021), Azerbaijani researcher
- Farid Alfa-Ruprecht (born 2006), German footballer
- Farid Ali (actor) (1945–2016), Bangladeshi actor
- Farid Ali (footballer) (born 1992), Ukrainian footballer
- Farid Ali (singer) (1919–1981), Algerian singer
- Farid Allawerdi (1923–2007), Iraqi composer, violist, musicologist, and teacher
- Farid Amarouche, French wheelchair athlete
- Faridul Haq Ansari (1895–1966), Indian lawyer and politician
- Farid El-Ashmawi (born 1941), Egyptian fencer
- Farid Aslani (born 1988), Iranian basketball player
- Farid al-Atrash (1910–1974), Syrian-Egyptian singer, music composer, and actor
- Farid ad-Din Attar (1145–1221), Iranian Sufi poet
- Farid Azarkan (born 1971), Dutch-Moroccan politician
- Farid Babayev (1959–2007), Russian politician
- Farid Badrul (born 1993), Malaysian motorcycle racer
- Farid Baghlani (1968–2010), Iranian serial killer
- Farid Bang (born 1986), German rapper
- Farid Basharat (born 1997), Afghan-British mixed martial artist
- Farid Behmardi (died 1986), Iranian executed prisoner
- Farid Belkahia (1934–2014), Moroccan artist and education reformer
- Farid Bellabès (born 1985), Algerian footballer
- Farid Belmellat (born 1970), Algerian footballer
- Farid Benstiti (born 1967), French-Algerian football coach and player
- Farid Beziouen (born 1986), French footballer
- Farid Boulaya (born 1993), French-Algerian footballer
- Farid Chaâl (born 1994), Algerian footballer
- Farid Cheklam (born 1984), Algerian footballer
- Farid Chenoune (1949–2024), French scholar, writer, and journalist
- Farid Chopel (1952–2008), French-Algerian actor, comedian, and singer
- Farid Ahmad Choudhury (1908–1975), Bangladeshi politician
- Farid Daoud (born 1989), Algerian footballer
- Farid Abraão David (1944–2020), Brazilian politician
- Farid Diaf (born 1971), French football player and coach
- Farid Díaz (born 1983), Colombian footballer
- Farid Dieck (born 1993), Mexican psychologist, writer, and internet personality
- Farid Djahnine (born 1976), Algerian footballer
- Farid Dosayev (born 1933), Ukrainian swimmer and sports commentator
- Farid Esack (born 1955), South African anti-apartheid activist and Islamic scholar
- Farid Fata (born 1965), Lebanese-American fraudster
- Farid Zablith Filho (born 1942), Brazilian Olympic swimmer
- Farid Gayibov (born 1979), Azerbaijani politician
- Farid Ghadry (born 1954), Syrian political activist
- Farid Ghazi (born 1974), Algerian footballer
- Farid Ghehiouèche (born 1971), French author, activist, and politician
- Farid Guliyev (born 1986), Azerbaijani footballer
- Farid Habib (1935–2012), Lebanese politician
- Farid Haerinejad, Iranian documentary maker and blogger
- Farid Hafez (born 1981), Austrian political scientist
- Farid Haghighi (born 1989), Iranian karateka
- Farid Hazem (born 1986), French footballer
- Farid Hossain (born 1953), Bangladeshi journalist and diplomat
- Farid Hourani, Lebanese-American physician and writer
- Faridul Huda (1929/30–1999), Bangladeshi physician and politician
- Farid Ibrahim (born 1998), Egyptian footballer
- Farid Isfarayini, Persian poet
- Faridul Islam (born 1968), Bangladeshi academic
- Farid Ismayilov (born 1998), Azerbaijani journalist and political prisoner
- Farid Jubran (1911–1995), Lebanese politician
- Farid Kamil (born 1981), Malaysian model and actor
- Farid Karam, Lebanese scout
- Farid Behzadi Karimi (born 1989), Iranian footballer
- Farid Khabibulin (born 1967), Uzbek footballer
- Farid Khan (field hockey) (1936–2021), Hong Kong field hockey player
- Farid Khan (politician) (died 2013), Pakistani politician
- Farid Ahmad Khan (born 1963), Pakistani physician and plastic surgeon
- Faridul Haq Khan (born 1956), Bangladeshi politician
- Farid Kharboutly (born 1953), Syrian sports shooter
- Farid Khavari (born 1943), Iranian-American economist, author, and businessman
- Farid Khazali (born 1998), Malaysian footballer
- Farid Elias Khazen (born 1960), Lebanese politician
- Farid Haykal Khazen (born 1970), Lebanese politician
- Faridun Nahar Laily (born 1954), Bangladeshi politician, entrepreneur, and freedom fighter
- Farid Madsoh (born 1987), Thai footballer
- Farid Majari (1958–2023), German-Iranian cultural manager and film producer
- Farid Makari (1947–2022), Lebanese politician
- Farid Mammadov (born 1991), Azerbaijani singer
- Farid Mansour (artist) (1929–2010), Lebanese sculptor and painter
- Farid Mansour (businessman) (1933–2012), Egyptian businessman
- Farid Mansurov (born 1982), Azerbaijani wrestler
- Farid Matuk, American poet and educator
- Farid Mehralizade (born 1994), Azerbaijani economist and political prisoner
- Farid El Melali (born 1997), Algerian footballer
- Farid Melgani, Italian engineer
- Farid Mellouli (born 1984), Algerian footballer
- Farid Melouk (born 1965), French-Algerian terrorist
- Farid Anfasa Moeloek (born 1944), Indonesian physician
- Farid Mohammadizadeh (born 1994), Iranian footballer
- Farid Mokhtari (born 1991), Iranian footballer
- Farid Mostafavi (born 1954), Iranian screenwriter
- Farid Mousavi, Iranian politician
- Faridun Muhiddinov, Tajik engineer and politician
- Farid Mukhametshin (born 1947), Russian politician
- Farid Nabiyev (born 1999), Azerbaijani footballer
- Farid Nazerfasihi (born 1984), Iranian visual effects supervisor
- Farid Nezal (born 1997), Malaysian footballer
- Farid Novin (born 1947), Iranian-Canadian economist
- Farid Nuzha (1895–1971), Assyrian nationalist and journalist
- Farid Ouédraogo (born 1996), Burkinabé footballer
- Farid Oulami (born 1974), Algerian table tennis player
- Farid Ahmad Paracha (born 1949), Pakistani politician and businessman
- Farid Ramli (born 1987), Malaysian footballer
- Farid Raphaël (1933–2014), Lebanese economist and banker
- Farid Rastagar (born 1963), Afghan singer and composer
- Farid Raymond-Anthony (1933–2015), Sierra Leonean writer, author, and poet
- Farid Rockeur (1963–2021), Algerian comedian, actor, and presenter
- Faridur Reza Sagar (born 1955), Bangladeshi media executive, writer, and film producer
- Farid Salman (born 1957), Iraqi boxer
- Farid Seiful-Mulyukov (1930–2016), Russian journalist, writer, and orientalist
- Farid Shawky (footballer) (born 1989), Egyptian footballer
- Farid Shawqi (1920–1998), Egyptian actor
- Farid Ahmed Shibli, Bangladeshi judge
- Farid Sid (born 1979), French rugby union player
- Farid Simaika (1907–1943), Egyptian Olympic diver
- Faridun bin Ahmad Sipahsalar, Persian military commander, Sufi disciple, and biographer
- Farid Stino (born 1943), Egyptian businessman
- Farid Suleman, American businessman
- Farid Szajnurov, Russian speedway rider
- Farid Talhaoui (born 1982), Moroccan footballer
- Farid Touil (born 1974), Algerian footballer
- Farid Trad (1901–1969), Lebanese engineer, architect, and art collector
- Farid Villaume (born 1975), French Muay Thai kickboxer
- Farid Wajdi, Indonesian lawyer
- Farid Yusifli (born 2002), Azerbaijani footballer
- Farid Zahran (born 1957), Egyptian politician
- Farid Zarif (born 1951), Afghan diplomat
- Farid Zato-Arouna (born 1992), Togolese footballer
- Farid Zemiti (born 1961), Algerian football manager
- Farid Zhangirov (born 1966), Russian football coach and player
- Farid Zizi, French public servant
- Farid Zoland (born 1949), Afghan songwriter and composer

=== Farit ===
- Farit Ismeth Emir (1954–2020), Malaysian news anchor
- Farit Gabidullin (born 1972), Russian serial killer
- Farit Mukhametshin (born 1947), Russian politician and diplomat
- Farit Zigangirov (1954–2026), Russian field hockey player

=== Ferid ===
- Ferid Ali (born 1992), Swedish footballer
- Ferid Ben Belgacem (born 1960), Tunisian football manager
- Ferid Berberi (born 1946–2021), Albanian sportsman and weightlifter
- Férid Boughedir (born 1944), Tunisian film director and screenwriter
- Ferid Chouchane (born 1973), Tunisian footballer
- Ferid Džanić (1918–1943), Bosnian World War II soldier
- Ferid Idrizović (born 1982), Bosnian-Herzegovinian footballer
- Ferid Imam (born 1980), Ethiopian-Canadian terrorist suspect
- Ferid Matri (born 1994), Swiss-Tunisian-Italian footballer
- Ferid Muhić (born 1943), Bosnian philosopher
- Ferid Murad (1936–2023), Albanian physician and pharmacologist, co-winner of the 1998 Nobel Prize in Physiology or Medicine.
- Ferid Radeljaš (born 1959), Bosnian-Herzegovinian footballer
- Ferid Rragami (born 1957), Albanian footballer
- Ferid Vokopola (1887–1969), Albanian politician, theologist, and translator

== Surname ==
=== Fareed ===
- Ahmed Fareed, American studio host and sports reporter
- Kamaal Ibn John Fareed (born 1970), American rapper also known as Q-Tip
- Kamaal Fareed (born 1970), American rapper, record producer, singer, actor, and DJ
- Muhammad Fareed (1926–2011), Pakistani mufti and writer
- Morad Fareed (born 1979), Palestinian-American entrepreneur
- Muneer Fareed (born 1956), South African-American Islamic scholar
- Vala Fareed (born 1975), Iraqi-Kurdish politician

=== Farid ===
- Alamgir Mohammad Mahfuzullah Farid, Bangladeshi politician
- Baba Farid (1173–1266), Punjabi Sufi saint
- Ibn al-Farid (1181–1234), Arab poet
- Jasmin Farid (born 1992), Swedish politician
- Khwaja Ghulam Farid (1841/45–1901), Siraiki poet
- Manouchehr Farid (1937–2026), Iranian actor
- Mariam Mamdouh Farid (born 1998), Qatari athlete
- Mohammad Farid (1868–1919), Egyptian politician

=== Faried ===
- Kenneth Faried (born 1989), American professional basketball player

== Fictional ==
- Farid, character in the book Inkheart by Cornelia Funke
- Ferid Egan, Commander of the Queen's Knights in the video game Suikoden V
- Farid, character in the game Call of Duty: Black Ops II
- Ferid Bathory, character in the manga Owari no Seraph
- Farid, character in the book The Kite Runner
- Fareed Bhansali, character in the book series The Vampire Chronicles by Anne Rice

== See also ==
- Farida (given name), the feminine form of the name
- Faridi, an Indian given name
- Shamsul Haque Faridpuri, derived from this name
