= Abd al-Salam =

Abd al-Salam (Arabic: عبد السلام) is a male Muslim honorific or given name, built on the Arabic words Abd, al- and Salam. The name means "servant of the All-peaceable", as-Salam being one of the names of God in the Qur'an, which give rise to the Muslim theophoric names.

Because the letter s is a sun letter, the letter l of the al- is assimilated to it. Thus although the name is written with letters corresponding to Abd al-Salam, the usual pronunciation corresponds to Abd as-Salam. Alternative transliterations include Abdul Salam, Abdul Salaam, Abdus Salam and others, all subject to variant spacing and hyphenation.

Notable people with the name include:

== People ==
=== Given name ===
- Abd as-Salam ibn Mashish al-Alami (1140–1227), Moroccan Sufi saint
- Abd As-Salam Al-Asmar (1455–1575), Libyan Muslim saint
- Abd al-Salam Ali al-Hila (born 1968), a Yemeni citizen, a Guantanamo detainee ID # 1463
- Abdusalam Abubakar (born 1990), Somali-Irish scientist
- Abdusalam Abas Ibrahim, full name of Abdus Ibrahim (born 1991), Ethiopian-American soccer player
- Abudushalamu Abudurexiti (born 1996), (ULY: Abdusalam Abdurëshit) Chinese professional basketball player of the Uyghur ethnic group
- Abdelsalam al-Majali (1925–2023), Prime Minister of Jordan
- Abdel Salam Al Nabulsy (1899–1968), Lebanese actor
- Abdul Salaam (American football) (1953–2024), American football player for the New York Jets
- Abdul Salam (jurist), Chief Justice of the Taliban's Supreme Court
- Abdul Salam (Indian politician) (1948–2017), Indian politician from Manipur
- Abdulsalam Abdullah (born 1965), Iraqi politician
- Abdulsalami Abubakar (born 1942), Nigerian politician
- Abdul Salaam Alizai, former member of the Taliban who defected to the government in 2007
- Abdul Salam Arif (1921–1966), president of Iraq
- Abdul Salam Azimi (1936–2026), Chief Justice of Afghanistan
- Abdul Salam al-Buseiri (1898–1978), Libyan Foreign Minister
- Abdulsalam Al Gadabi (born 1978), Yemeni swimmer
- Abdul Salam Hanafi (born 1969), Taliban leader
- Abdulsalaam Jumaa (born 1979), UAR footballer
- Abdul Salam Mumuni, Ghanaian film maker
- Abdul-Salam Ojeili (1917–2006), Syrian novelist and politician
- Abdul Salam Rocketi (born 1958), Taliban commander who shot down a Soviet helicopter with a rocket propelled grenade, and who ran for office in 2005
- Abdul Salam Sabrah (1912–2012), acting Prime Minister of the Yemen Arab Republic
- Abdul Salam Gaithan Mureef Al Shehry (born 1984), citizen of Saudi Arabia, Guantanamo detainee ID # 132
- Abdoul Salam Sow (born 1970), Guinean football player
- Abdoul Salem Thiam, known as Abdoul Thiam, (born 1976), German footballer
- Abdul Salam Zaeef (born 1968), Afghan ambassador to Pakistan
- Abdus Salam (1926–1996), Pakistani physicist and Nobel laureate
- Abdus Salam (activist) (1925–1952), died during the Bengali Language Movement demonstrations
- Abdus Salam (businessman), Bangladeshi businessman
- Abdus Salam (Chattogram politician) (born 1951), Bangladeshi politician
- Abdus Salam (editor) (1910–1977), Bangladeshi journalist
- Abdus Salam (general) (born 1942), Bangladeshi politician and retired major general
- Abdus Salam (newscaster) (1925–1992), Pakistani newscaster
- Abdus Salam (politician, born 1942) (1942–2011), Bangladeshi politician
- Abdus Salam (Sylhet politician) (1906–1999), Bangladeshi politician
- Abdus Salam (Thakurgaon politician), Bangladeshi politician
- Abdus Salam Khan (1906–1972), Bangladeshi politician
- Abdus Salam Murshedy (born 1963), Bangladeshi politician, entrepreneur and footballer
- Abdus Salam Pintu, Bangladeshi politician and former deputy minister
- Abdussalam Puthige (born 1964), Indian journalist
- Abdus Salam Sarkar (1942–2011), Bangladeshi politician from Sherpur
- Abdus Salam Talukder (1936–1999), Bangladeshi politician and lawyer
- Abdeslam Ahizoune (born 1955), Moroccan businessman
- Abdeslam Akouzar (born 1982), Moroccan-French footballer
- Abdessalem Arous (born 1979), Tunisian judoka
- Abdessalam Benjelloun (born 1985), Moroccan footballer
- Abdeslam Boulaich, Moroccan story-teller
- Abdessalam Jalloud (born 1944), Prime Minister of Libya
- Abdesalam Kames, Libyan footballer
- Abdeslam Ouaddou (born 1978), Moroccan footballer
- Abdesslam Yassine (1928–2012), leader of Moroccan Islamist organisation Al Adl Wa Al Ihssane
- Ali Abdussalam Treki, or Ali Treki, (1937–2015), Libyan diplomat
- Ashraf Salim Abd Al Salam Sultan (born 1971), Libyan Guantanamo detainee ID # 263
- Mehdat Abdul Salam Shabana, director of Konsojaya Trading Company, alleged terrorist front organization based in Kuala Lumpur
- Mohamed Abdul Salam Mahgoub (1935–2022), Egyptian politician
- Nader Abdussalam Al Tarhouni (born 1979), Libyan footballer
- Samir Abdussalam Aboud, known as Samir Aboud (born 1972), Libyan footballer

=== Surname ===
- Belaid Abdessalam (1928–2020), Algerian politician
- Chérif Abdeslam (born 1978), Algerian footballer
- Ibrahim Abdeslam (born 1984), one of the perpetrators of the November 2015 Paris attacks
- Kamal Abdulsalam (born 1973), Libyan-Qatari bodybuilder
- K. M. Abdus Salam, Bangladeshi civil servant
- Rhadi Ben Abdesselam (1929–2000), Moroccan runner
- Salah Abdeslam (born 1989), Belgian-born French terrorism suspect in the November 2015 Paris attacks, brother of Ibrahim Abdesalam
- Shadi Abdel Salam (1930–1986), Egyptian film director
- Muhammad Abdul Salam, Pakistani politician
- Muhammad Salaam (Muhammad Abdul Salaam, 1931–2016), Indian footballer

== See also ==
- Abdul
- Salaam (disambiguation)
