= Abdessalem =

Abdessalem is a male given name and surname. Notable people with the name include:

== Surname ==
- Belaid Abdessalem (1928–2020), Algerian politician, prime minister from 1992 to 1993
- Rafik Abdessalem, Tunisian politician

== Given name ==
- Abdessalem Arous (born 1979), Tunisian judoka
- Abdessalem Ayouni (born 1994), Tunisian middle-distance runner
- Abdessalem Hallaoui (born 1989), Tunisian footballer
- Abdessalem Mansour (born 1949), Tunisian politician
- Abdessalem Mseddi (born 1945), Tunisian linguist, diplomat, writer, literary critic and ex-minister
- Abdessalem ben Rhadi (1929–2000), Moroccan long-distance runner

== See also ==
- Bab Sidi Abdessalem, one of the gates of the medina of Tunis
- Abd al-Salam
