= University of Mosul =

Public university in Iraq

- جامعة الموصل
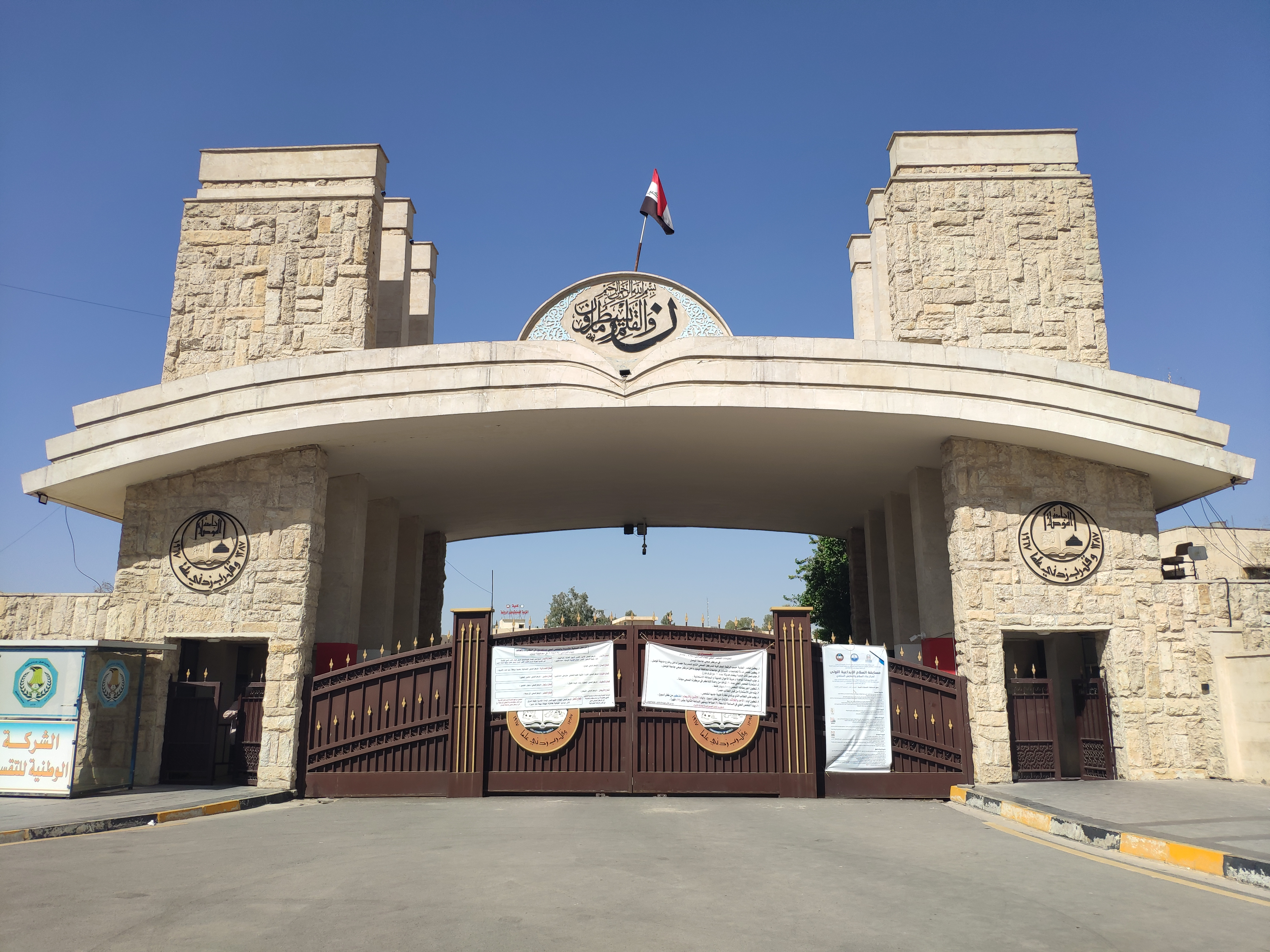
- Motto: وَقُل رَّبِّ زِدْنِي عِلْمًا "And say: My Lord! Increase me in knowledge." (20:114)
- Type: Public
- Established: 1967
- Affiliations: University of Iraq, Mosul provincial council, Mayor of Mosul, AARU
- Chancellor: Kossay K. Alahmady
- Vice-Chancellor: Dr. Mazin Nazar Fadhel; Dr. Muneer Salim Al-Badrany
- Academic staff: 4,180
- Administrative staff: 740
- Students: 51,926
- Postgraduates: 5,158
- Location: Mosul, Iraq = 36.3822°N 43.1439°E
- Campus: Al-Majmoa'a Street
- Colours: Dark Blue
- Website: www.uomosul.edu.iq

The University of Mosul (Arabic: جامعة الموصل) is a public university located in Mosul. It is one of the largest educational and research centers in the Middle East, and the second largest in Iraq, behind the University of Baghdad.

The University of Mosul was closed by ISIS (Islamic State) in 2014 but reopened just after a few months with new buildings and courses. Over 8,000 books in its library were believed to have been destroyed. The university was considered to have been used as a base by ISIS and was hit by Combined Joint Task Force airstrikes in March 2016. Iraqi forces recaptured it in January 2017.

== History ==
The University of Mosul was founded in April 1967, building on the foundations of the 1929 College of Medicine, under the control of the Ministry of Health.

The university was established as an academic center of higher education in the city of Mosul, Iraq. Today the university offers accredited bachelor's, master's, and doctorate degrees in more than 100 scientific specializations. More than 80,000 students have graduated since the foundation of the university.

=== Fall to ISIS and recapture by Iraqi government ===
When ISIS captured the city of Mosul during the 2014 Northern Iraq Offensive, the university was shut down and looted. When it was reopened under their control that year, the only fields of study permitted were medicine, dentistry, nursing, and pharmacy. The university was used as a base by ISIS, with certain buildings being used as barracks and manufacturing facilities for weaponry. Many of the chemistry laboratories were used for the production of chemical weapons, and some were left booby-trapped when the city was retaken by Iraqi forces in 2017. Over 8,000 books and 100,000 manuscripts in its library were believed to have been destroyed. The university reopened in March 2017 with some buildings still under construction.

== Medical College ==
The medical college is located in the Medical Township which includes the Teaching Hospitals in al-Shifa'a Court, Mosul City, Iraq. The College of Medicine was the first established College of what is now the University of Mosul, founded in 1959 and initially affiliated with the Department of Health and subsequently with the University of Baghdad. In April 1967 and with the establishment of the University of Mosul, the college became part of University of Mosul.

The Undergraduate program in the Medical College is six years and the language of instruction is English. The college grants doctorate degrees with the Iraqi and Arabic Boards. The Medical College has 142 staff, and the total number of graduates from the college up until 1992 was well over 6400.

== Sports and athletic facilities ==
Mosul University has several athletic facilities, including the College of Physical Education, a multi-purpose arena and home to the Mosul basketball teams. It also serves both as the university's primary recreation facility and as a satellite location for several varsity sports. The college also has cardio rooms, an Olympic-sized swimming pool, a smaller pool for aquarobics and other activities, a mezzanine where classes are held, an indoor cycling studio, weight rooms, and a gym floor for basketball. The college also holds sports such as volleyball, fencing, and wrestling. The offices of women's field hockey, lacrosse, soccer, softball, and men's soccer are also in the college. Mosul takes part in inter-university competitions in a wide range of sports.

== Research centers ==
The university houses a number of scientific research centers, which reflect the university's orientation towards technological and practical developments. These centers conduct research, develop and update the university departments.

- Computer Center
- Environment and Water Resources Center
- Regional Studies Center
- Mosul Studies Center
- Remote Sensing Center
- Non-Irrigated Agriculture Research Center
- Academic Teaching and Training Improvement Center

== Library system ==
After being one of the finest in the Middle East, The Mosul University Library System, during the invasion of Iraq in March 2003, was physically damaged and its holding either removed by staff for protection or looted by others. Many library employees took home many books to protect them from the looters, and the protected books were eventually returned to the library. Many other books were looted or were damaged. Reconstruction has been slow due to corruption in ministries and the violence that has plagued the city and much of the country.

Undergraduates continue to use the library, particularly because of its easy access as it is central to most locations within the university. The Medical College Library is the primary repository for Mosul University's rare books and manuscripts. Iraq's oldest collections of maps, gazetteers and atlases both old and new are stored in the university's Central Library and is open to the public. The library holds collections of Arabic and foreign literature.

The Central Library is the main source of information at the university and plays an important role in facilitating research and enhancing the teaching process. It is open to students and staff, supporting learning, teaching and research.

The library is located in the center of the university campus, and is composed of the following sections:

- Classification and Cataloging Section
- Periodical Section
- Circulation Section
- Multimedia Section

== Campus ==
The University of Mosul is a multi-campus university consisting of three campuses located to the north of the city, and the College of Medicine which is located at the medical compound of the city.

== Colleges ==
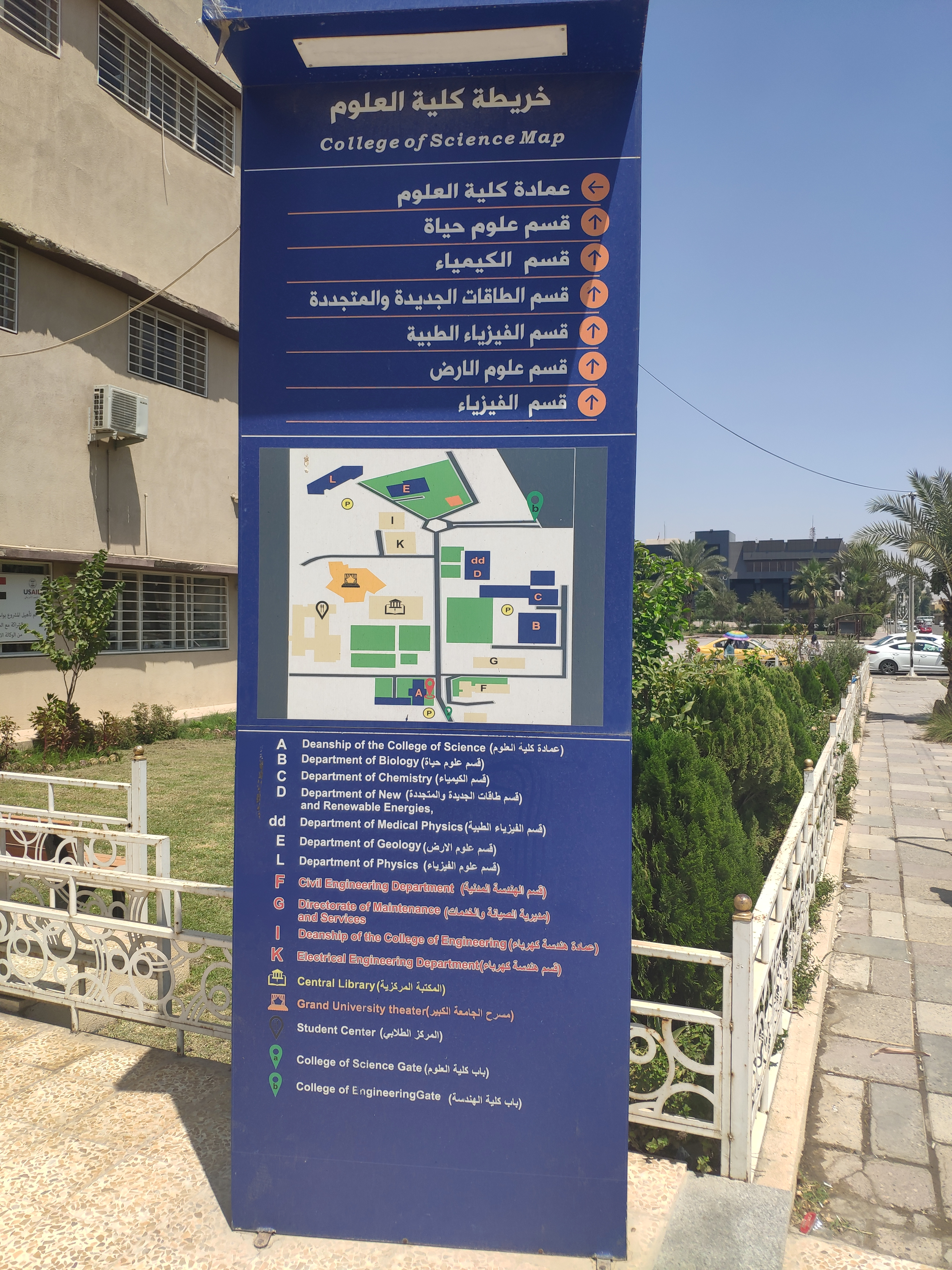
Map of the University of Mosul

The first steps towards the establishment of the University of Mosul were taken in 1959, with the founding of the College of Medicine which was then part of the Ministry of Health, and subsequently linked to the University of Baghdad until the University of Mosul was created in 1967.

In 1963 two more colleges were established: the College of Engineering and the College of Science, followed by the College of Agriculture in 1964 and College of Arts on 1966.

Reflecting the increasing needs of the different academic specialization in Iraq, the university continued to establish more colleges and departments: in 1975 the Education College was founded, and the Veterinary Medicine College in 1976. By 2011 there were a total of 24 colleges, and this framework still exists.

The 19 official colleges of the university are:

- College of Medicine (Mosul)
- College of Medicine (Nineveh)
- College of Dentistry
- College of Pharmacy
- College of Engineering
- College of Sciences
- College of Arts
- College of Agriculture and Forestry
- College of Administration and Economy
- College of Education
- College of Veterinary Medicine
- College of Physical Education
- College of Law
- College of Archeology
- College of Education for girls
- College of Basic Education
- College of Nursing
- College of Fine Arts
- College of Computer Science and Mathematics
- College of Electronics Engineering
- College of Political Sciences
- College of Islamic Sciences
- College of Environmental Techniques
- College of Tourism Sciences

=== College of Medicine (Mosul) ===
Mosul Medical College of the University of Mosul is proud to be the second oldest medical college in Iraq. It was established in July 1959 and right then began its programs and 1st academic year that consisted of 30 medical students enrolled in September of the same year. During the academic year (1959–1960) the college was managed by the Ministry of Health, and then it was incorporated in Baghdad University and remained so until the 1st of April 1967 when it was affiliated to and became one of the founding colleges of Mosul University. Since then the college has experienced an impressive growth in all areas of academic, community, and health services as well as international collaborations. The college is built on a 12500 square meters land which is located in the northern part of Mosul city on the right bank of the Tigris River near the major teaching hospitals.

The academic year starts in September until the end of June to be followed by summer holiday for two months. There is another 14 days holiday (spring holiday) after a mid-year examination in January. The education in the college is free and the college is funded by central government and Ministry of Higher Education and Scientific Research.

=== College of Pharmacy ===
The College of Pharmacy at the University of Mosul was established in 1992 and is located on the university campus.

The college is organized into six major departments: Department of Pharmaceutical Sciences, Department of Pharmacology, Department of Clinical Pharmacy, Department of Pharmacognosy, Department of Pharmaceutical Chemistry and Department of Clinical Laboratory Sciences.

The teaching programs of study are courses of five years. The first four years include courses in basic, pre-pharmaceutical, pharmaceutical and clinical sciences which involve theoretical, practical and clinical experiences. In the fifth year and for six months the students attend departments in hospitals for training in clinical pharmacy or specializations such as pediatrics, internal and surgery wards. This is followed by one month of training in the pharmaceutical industry and one month of training at the Drug and Poison Information Center. In this center the students study and practice the design of clinical trials, evaluation of clinical papers and professional communication. Two summer programs are also involved, including training in community pharmacy and in hospital pharmacy to improve students' knowledge in pharmacy practice and pharmaceutical skills. On completion of the fifth year the student is awarded a bachelor's degree in pharmaceutical sciences (B.Pharm.).

=== College of Veterinary Medicine ===
The College of Veterinary Medicine was founded in 1976. The programs of study in the college last for five years leading to the award of a bachelor's degree in veterinary medicine and surgery (BVMS). The programs offer theoretical, practical and clinical experiences in different aspects of veterinary medicine and surgery. The graduated veterinarians are expected to serve the community with regards to animal health, welfare and production as well as issues of the environment and public health. Rich varied and extensive livestock production in Mosul and its surroundings and referrals from nearby areas provide a wealth of clinical material for professional education and research in veterinary medicine and surgery. The college has a scientific journal (Iraqi Journal of Veterinary Sciences).

=== College of Electronics Engineering ===
Faculty of Electronics Engineering is one of the Mosul University colleges founded in 2002. It consists of three scientific departments: Computer and Information Engineering, Communications Engineering, and Electronic Engineering) and aims to found scientific cadres with various majors in order to make engineering cadres more specialized in field of work and have the ability of communicating with the technological revolution taking place in the scientific disciplines and the ability of grasping parts of sciences and investing them.

Duration of the study: four years and the major begins in the first year. Programs; BSc in each of the three departments.

         MSc in communication engineering.
         MSc in computer engineering 

College location: lies in the north-west of the campus.

=== College of Administration and Economics ===
The college was established by the Iraqi Economists Association in the name "Business Management and Accounting College" in 1968. A (240) students were accepted to study a five-year course in the accountancy department and business management. The next year another department was opened called Economics department. The study was in the evening only. In 1974 the college was supplemented by the University of Mosul.

The college focused on the quality of the outputs in order to achieve the society needs with high quality which leads to expand the plan of opening the specialized, scientific departments in the administration and economics. The college now contains six departments which are: Business Management, Economics, Accountancy, Banking and financial Sciences, Industrial management and Management Information Systems department. The last one was established lately in 2002–2003 to pursue the development of businesses and the spread of information technology and communications which add the features of electronics works in all fields of specialization. And also a high study for diploma, master and doctorate was created in the information systems, accountancy, financial sciences and economics.

=== College of Basic Education ===
Since its establishment in 1993, the College of Basic Education has been seeking to prepare a well-qualified teaching elite, scientifically and educationally, to teach in different stages of basic education primary and secondary, therefore it would participate in improving the existent teaching and educational sector in Iraq. It has also been seeking to promote scientific research in various annals of knowledge, theory and application. The college of Basic Education has also been promulgating knowledge and sciences in different specializations to achieve scientific development in Iraq.

=== College of Physical Education ===
The College of Physical education is one of the colleges of the university of Mosul. It was founded in 1977 in order to provide specialized staff in sport education. The students at its opening year were 48 male and female students. The period of study in the college is four academic years, then the student get a bachelor's degree in sport education.

Since its foundation, the college began to develop on all aspects to reach to this update state. The buildings of the college consist of indoor halls, outdoor stadium, swimming pool, physical fitness hall, and physiology laboratories, human performance laboratory. The development included the scientific aspects, especially postgraduate studies so that in 1987-1988 the first postgraduate accepted with eight students to have master's degrees. In 1992-1993 the first two students accepted to have doctorate degrees. The college tries its best to develop the correspondent colleges in the Arab homeland, so that it sent a number of its lecturers to teach in Libya, Yemen, Jordan, Syria, and Algeria universities. The staff also were sent to various Arabic and continental conferences. The college consists of three branches, the individual games, team games, and sport sciences in addition to the direction of the collegiate sport and art.

=== College of Political Science ===
The College of Political Science was founded, at the beginning, as an independent department within the college of Law and Politics in 1985. Two groups graduated from this department, the first one in the study year 1988-1989 and the second one in 1989–1990. After that, students’ admittance was halted for the incapability of establishing an independent college of political science at that time.

The department of Political Science was reopened in accordance with the university decree, numbered (1/8/5273) and dated on 28/6/2000, under the same name (Department of Political Science) and within the College of Law and Politics too. Study in this department continued for two successive years. After that, the department was developed into a self independent college (College of Political Science), to be added to Mosul University college deaneries, in accordance with the university decree, numbered (1/8/5313) and dated on 28/5/2002, occupying the sequence (19). The College of Political Science currently includes two branches: International Relations and Public Policy.

== Notable alumni ==
- Abdel-Wahab al-Sa'adi
- Abdulsalam Abdullah
- Adnan Koucher
- Amin Abbosh
- Falah Mustafa Bakir
- Falih Al-Fayyadh
- Karim Findi
- Hajim al-Hassani
- Ibrahim al-Jaafari
- Sayyar Jamil
- Najmiddin Karim
- Nawal Nasrallah
- Nawala Al-Mutawalli
- Omar Mohammed
- Atheel al-Nujaifi
- Osama al-Nujaifi
- Layla Salih
- Rowsch Shaways
- Fatih Abd Al Salam

== See also ==
- List of Islamic educational institutions
- List of universities in Iraq
