= Farid Allawerdi =

Iraqi composer and musicologist (1923–2007)

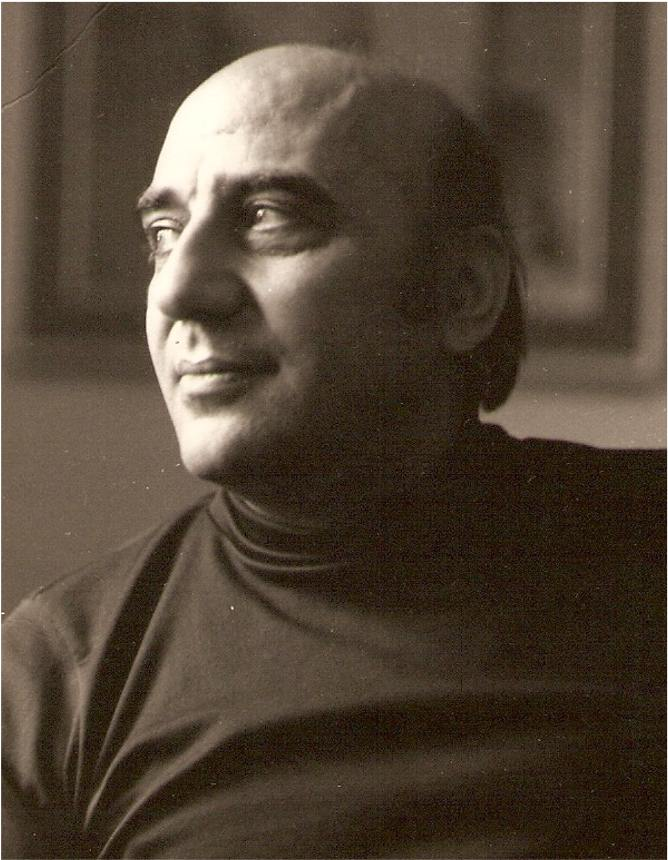
- Allawerdi c.1960s
- Born: 1923; Basra, Iraq
- Died: 2007 (aged 83–84); Dublin, Ireland
- Citizenship: Irish
- Spouse: Mila Allawerdi (1937-2013)

Farid Allawerdi (1923–2007, Arabic: فريد الله ويردي, Russian: Фарид Алахверди), also transliterated as Farid Allahwerdi or Farid Allah Werdi, was an Iraqi composer, violist, musicologist, and teacher, and is considered one of Iraq's most innovative and influential composers. As a composer, he was the first and only one to be internationally recognized and as a member of the International Society for Contemporary Music he appeared on their International Rostrum of Composers. His compositions have been performed in concerts and on radio and television, in the United States, France, Japan, Russia, Switzerland, Syria, Egypt and many far-Eastern countries. He won many awards and honours, including Prix D’Honneur de 'L'Ecole Nationale de Musique de Saint-Brieuc, Paris, and a Diploma of Appreciation for his leading role in furthering Arab Music 1970–1995 by the Arab League, Arab Academy of Music. He explored contemporary musical idioms to find his own unique language where two completely different musical traditions – that of the Middle East and of the contemporary classical – could merge seamlessly. In his Quartet No.1, the richness of the scale and rhythms used in Iraqi Maqam (Saba) are deeply rooted in the soil of his nation's folk tradition and form a synthesis with his classical training.

The 1940s and 1950s saw an artistic renaissance. He was involved in bridging the gap between modernity and heritage. He used the twelve-tone combined with the quarter-tone (an ancient Arabic mode), together with silences that have structural function, and “knocking the wood” for two different percussive sounds in evocation of traditional Iraqi dance drums.

As an accomplished instrumentalist, having studied the Violin and Viola, and as a member of several string quartets, Allawerdi had a natural affinity for composing for strings. His Fantasia for the Violin Alone is considered one of the most challenging compositions for the instrument. It was notably performed by Vartan Manoogian, Boris Klepov and Kumiko Ito.

== Early life and family ==
Allawerdi was born in Basra, Iraq in 1923. His father, Issa Nouri Allawerdi was a physician from Kirkuk, and his mother, Victoria Oskanian, an Armenian from a prominent family in Istanbul. His early childhood in Basra was enriched by a mosaic of ethnic and religious cultures, both local and foreign. From an early age, Allawerdi was exposed to a wide range of soundscapes; his Mother's songs in Arabic, Armenian, Turkish and French; the sonorous cries of street vendors; Bedouin beggars chanting to the accompaniment of a Rababah (an Iraqi Bedouin single stringed fiddle); wedding processions with Drum and Zurnah (a double reed wood wind instrument ); children beating rhythmic patterns on the Tablah (large, two-sided drum); a blind Sheik in the Bazaar reciting verses from the Koran; the incomprehensible invocations of an Indian Fakir; a Muezzin's call to prayer; a Chaldean Priest chanting litanies from the Bible; all these and more fostered a strong impetus to transgress his own ethnic, religious and national boundaries.

== Education and career ==
His mother, a talented artist, encouraged his artistic development. By the age of five, he was singing, improvising on the mandolin and painting under her guidance and encouragement. This early musical education at home later developed through chanting at Chaldean church services and as a leading member of various school choirs.

It was only in 1944, and after years of residence in different parts of the country, that the family finally settled in Baghdad where Allawerdi had the opportunity to study music academically with European teachers at the then newly established Fine Arts Institute. He studied Violin with Sandu Albu (a former student of Zoltán Kodály) while at the same time studying law at the Law College in Baghdad. As a music student he was recognized as very gifted. Professor Sandu Albu considered him “ ... the only talent for composition in Iraq.” Prof. Sandu Albu's letter of 31 August 1955).

After graduating from Law College in 1948 he devoted himself completely to music and its development in Iraq.

From 1950 to 1952 Allawerdi, was a scholarship student in Paris for his higher theoretical studies under professors Henry Challen and Francis-Paul Demillac (Enyss Djemil) where he absorbed and used creatively the achievements of the new stylistic trends. He was quickly identified with all that was progressive in the musical world of his time.

In 1951 he composed his first piece, Rondo for Guitar and Clarinet which was performed the same year in Baghdad.

In 1952 he returned to Baghdad, where he taught theory of music and harmony at the Fine Arts Institute. Together with his colleagues he established the Baghdad Philharmonic Society and was a member of a Chamber group composed of Professor Julian Hertz, Piano; Professor Sandu Albu, 1st violin; Vartan Manoogian 2nd violin; Farid Allawerdi, Viola; Professor Andre Theurer, Cello. He continues to perform with the Chamber Group until 1959.

Upon the popular Iraqi uprising and subsequent revolution in 1958, he composed a Hymn Al-Mansouriya, which he dedicated to the Iraqi people. It was performed in June 1959 by the Moscow Radio Symphony Orchestra (Tchaikovsky Symphony Orchestra) under Conductor Alexei Kovalev (Алексей Ковалёв). The recording was used extensively by Baghdad Radio and Television after speeches of the leader Abd al-Karim Qasim. The popularity of the Al Mansouriya subsequently led to Allawerdi being condemned to death in absentia and the hymn banned after the 1963 Ba'ath Party coup d'état Ramadan Revolution.

In December 1959 he went to Moscow to continue his education at the Moscow State Tchaikovsky Conservatory Moscow Conservatory where he studied composition under professor Evgeny Golubev.

He also studied instrumentation with Professor Nikolai Rakov#:, Analysis of musical works with Professor Bobrovsky V.V., Universal piano with Smoliakov B.G., Teaching methods with Fedorov T.N., and Harmony and Polyphony with Alfred Schnittke.

In 1964 he presented his thesis on the Theory of Music for publication at the Tchaikovsky Conservatory. Discussing his book, the Dean of the Department of Music, Professor Sergei Screbov (Скребков, Сергей Сергеевич) noted that: “For the first time, in Allawerdi’s book, the characteristics of Arabic music, particularly its Rhythmical scale, quarter tone intonations, etc. were given a scientific basis ... therefore we would like to have a full translation of the book in Russian to enable us to use it in our work at the Moscow Conservatory” (Decision:: Department of Theory of Music at Moscow, Tchaikovsky Conservatory, 29 May 1964).

At the Tchaikovsky Conservatory Allawerdi took part in musical circles with his fellow student composers such as Iosif Andriasov, Dzhivani Mikhailov, Boris Tobis (Тобис, Борис Ильич) and others.

In 1963, after a bloody coup, the Ba’ath Party came to power in Iraq. Allawerdi was condemned to death in absentia due to the popularity of his hymn, Al-Mansouriya, with the previous government. The authorities labelled him a communist for his independent character and radical thoughts. His passport was confiscated and his scholarship was cancelled. As a result, he was forced to join his family in the USA where he continued his studies on his own account under Professor Donald Lybbert of the City University of New York where he graduated with an MA degree in composition. Commenting on his graduation work, Professor Donald Lybbert said: “... in the judgement of the graduate committee of the department, is one of the finest ever to be presented to this committee.” (Letter by Prof Donald Lybbert of September 20, 1968).

While in the US, he was commissioned (1965–1968) to compose for the Annual Festival of American Music in New York. In 1965, he composed the Invention in Triple Counterpoint Pianoforte, in 1966, Sonata for Violin and Piano, in 1967, Fantasy for Violin Alone, and in 1968, Petite Suite for Piano. Upon graduation he found work at the Glassboro State College, now Rowan College of New Jersey.

When in 1968, the new Iraqi government published a General Amnesty for political exiles, Allawerdi returned to Baghdad in October of that year. There he found a very depressing musical scene. The Symphony Orchestra had been disbanded, and many promising musicians were still in exile abroad. The only opportunity for musicians was teaching at the Fine Arts Institute.

The coalition government of Democrats, Nationalists, Communists and other parties with the leading Ba’ath Party permitted him to return to his former position as a music teacher at Baghdad College of Fine Arts, but with the same salary of 1959 without any legal entitlements to compensation for his successful studies. He tried to revive the chamber music orchestra but discovered that musicians were dispirited due to years of oppression, and most were out of practice due to their second jobs that had nothing to do with music.

He also learned that his Hymn Al-Mansouriyah was still blacklisted despite the General Amnesty, and that the Ba’ath party had made a political issue of his musical compositions. A well known Ba’ath party ideologist approached him with the proposition to write a new National Anthem in exchange for a position as head of a new music department. He declined, saying that as long as Al-Mansouriyah remained blacklisted, he would not write a National Anthem.

Allawerdi had this to say: “I returned to Baghdad with a decision not to write, principally, any music that politics could allude to. They kept asking directly and indirectly, and I kept avoiding them by saying that I am not composing anymore. I was sick of their constant pressure and they were fed up with me too.”

He was to remain a target for persecution by the regime until his departure from the country in 1991.

Allawerdi remained active in spite of this political pressure. With his background in Law, he was instrumental in establishing an Artist Union in Iraq. His special concern had been the rights of artists, especially folk singers and musicians, who lacked permanent employment and had no security when they lost their ability to perform. He secured their rights to a pension and raised their professional status in Iraqi society for the sheer gratitude of musicians to the powerful men who employ them, had, more than anything else, displayed the marginalized position of Iraqi musicians.

In 1969 Allawerdi was invited to deliver a speech, Towards International Arab Music, at the Second International Cairo Congress of Arab Music. He proposed to establish a Traditional Music Centres to record and archive folk and traditional music. He expressed the necessity of not only preserving this heritage but also the importance of developing a Modern Arabic Music with the particular identity of each country. He believed that three interrelated factors were crucial for this development: the composer-theoretic; the musicologist-theoretic who analysis Arab music on a scientific basis; and the musician-performer with theoretical knowledge. Thus, concentration on any of them while the other two are neglected would cause imbalance and consequently paralyse the musical art movement as a whole.

He stressed the importance of the official sponsorship of graduates of musical institutions who should be assigned proper fields of application. Noteworthy in this respect is the establishment of national symphony orchestras.

From 1970 to 1975 Allawerdi was Head of the Traditional Music Centre at the Radio and Television Broadcasting Establishment in Baghdad and for two years (1972–1974) carried out an extensive field survey and recording of Iraqi Traditional and Folk music all over Iraq (Arab, Kurdish, Assyrian, Turkmen, and others) safeguarding this heritage prior to the war against the Kurdish people, the Iran-Iraq war, and the subsequent Gulf wars, which annihilated and uprooted the populations of the rural areas where this ancient heritage had flourished for millennium. The collected material was classified and catalogued for academic and public use. He used these recordings in his public and academic lectures abroad to encourage the process of mutual understanding between people with different cultural backgrounds.

In 1971 Allawerdi's Quartet No.1 was first performed in Paris by Quatuor Margand (The Margand String Quartet - Le Quatuor Margand), who added this Quartet to their repertoire of contemporary composers and performed it on their World Tour.

In 1972 Allawerdi was a member of the founding committee that established the School of Music and Ballet in Baghdad. He was of the opinion that the school should be the foundation of musical education in Iraq. He proposed to select talented children from all around the country and provide them with tutors, lodgings and stipends to ensure their future by providing them with scholarships to continue their musical education abroad so that Iraq could ensure professionals able to contribute to the musical development in the country and raise the status of musicians in the community. He was unfortunately outvoted. The school enrolled mostly children of the middle classes in Baghdad, who could afford private teachers but who would never allow their children to become professional musicians.

From 1976 till 1981 he was teaching music appreciation for Drama students at the Academy of Fine Arts, University of Baghdad, and laying the foundation for establishing a music department at university level.

In 1993 and 1997 Allawerdi's Quartet No. 1 and Fantasy for Violin Alone were performed in Tokyo, Japan by the Yasuda Quartet.

In 1995, Allawerdi contributed in al-Said's book, Dialogue in Plastic Arts, Amman, Darat Al Funoon, 1995 (in Arabic).

In 2002, Allawerdi settled in Ireland. He was a member of the Contemporary Music Centre Ireland (CMC) and participated in its activities. He continued to work on his compositions and carry out research on Music Development in Iraq until his death in 2007.

In May 2024, Allawerdi's musical archives were donated to The National Museum of Music MUSEUS E MONUMENTOS, which is located in the Palace of Mafra, for preservation and public research. The archives are composed of original scores, composition reels and recordings, Iraqi newspaper and magazine articles relating to music and arts, dating as far back as 1940s, research notes and theses, original concert programs and invitations, letters from international musicians and composers, such as, Bogusław Schaeffer, Witold Roman Lutosławski, Alfred Schnittke, Bella Eolian, Louis Brodowski, Witold Rudzinski, Witold Szalonek, Francis-Paul Demillac (Enyss Djemil), Iosif Andriasov, Vartan Manoogian, Evgeny Glubev, Michèle Margand, Naziha Rashid نزيهة رشيد, Sayyar Jamil and many others. The donation also included Allawerdi's viola by Carlo De March (1904–1993), dated 1949.

== Memberships ==
- Iraqi Artists Union, of which he was a founding member)
- Union of Iraqi Lawyers
- SACEM, Societe Des Auteurs Compositeurs et Editeurs De Musique, France
- SNAC, Syndicat National Des Autuers et Des Compositeurs De Musique, France
- CMC, Contemporary Music Centre, Ireland

== Compositions ==
- Romance for Soprano/Tenor (Poetry by Wahab Al-Bayati/Selwa Shamelian), 1973
- Song for Soprano, (Poetry by Abdul Wahab Al-Bayati) 1973
- Song (Poetry by Abdul Wahab Al-Bayati), 1973
- String Quartet No. 1, 1968
- Petite Suite, Piano, 1966
- Fantasy for Violin alone, 1965
- Choral prelude, 1965
- Sonata for Violin, 1965
- Sonata for Violin and Piano, 1963
- Piece for String Quartet/Allegro non Tropo, 1962
- Piece for Quartet/Allegro Malto, 1962
- In Memory of Jawad Selim, 6 January 1961
- Hymn Symphonique, 1959
- Al-Mansouriyah, 1959
- Marsh, 1957
- Andante con Eleganza for piano, 1954
- Siciliano for String Orchestra,1953
- Rondo for Clarinet and Guitar, 1951
- Alterne/Instrumental Piece, 1953
- Allegretto, Violin, 1953

== Bibliography ==
- Folk Vocal Traditional Music of Iraq
- Trends in the Secular Music Culture of Iraq today: A preliminary survey
- La melodie l’accent (in French)
- Towards International Arabic Music/IMC Conference on Arabic Music, Cairo, 1969 - in Arabic and English
- Development of Arabic music, 1962 - in Russian
- Eclectism in the Symphony No 2 for String Orchestra and Trumpet (ad libitum) of A. Honegger with brief formal analysis of the Symphony
- The Dramatism and Stylistic Features of the Liturgical Sequence
- The Stylistic difference between G. Machaut's Ballade: Je puis trop bien and G. Binchol's Chanson: De plus en plus
- The Stylistic features of the Free Counterpoint of the late Baroque Polyphonic Themes
- The Stylistic features of the Songs of Hugo Wolf
- The treatment of the Chorale melody in the Buxtehude's and Bach's organ Work
- Critical Analysis of “At du Old Trysting-Place” by Edward MacDavell, op 51
