= Faridi =

Fareedi or Faridi is a clan of the Farooqi tribe named after Farīduddīn Mas'ūd Ganjshakar, a murid of a sheikh who belongs to the Sufi order of Fariduddin Ganjshakar and one of the noble family from Hyderabad known as Paigah family they are also descendant of Fariduddin Ganjshakar. Hazrat Baba Fariuddin GanjShakar was a murid and spiritual successor of Qutbuddin Bakhtiyar Kaki. Baba Farid was a descendent of second caliph of Islam Umar ibn Khattab (RA).

== Surname ==
- Abdul Haque Faridi (1903–1996), Bangladeshi educator and author
- Ayesha Faridi (born 1979), Indian news anchor
- Fazlur Rahman Faridi (1932–2011), Indian Islamic studies scholar, economist and writer
- Humayun Faridi (1952–2012), Bangladeshi actor
- Navid Faridi (born 1977), Iranian footballer
- Sami Faridi (born 1983), Saudi Arabian-born cricketer
- Shadaab Faridi, Indian playback singer
- Shah Shahidullah Faridi (1915–1978), British Muslim convert
- Fazal Razzaq Faridi (1998 to Present) Descendent of Baba Farid and a Jagirdar from Budaun (UP)

== Given name ==
- Faridi Mussa (born 1996), Tanzanian footballer
- Qamar-ul-Zaman Faridi Chishti (1940–2011), Muslim Saint

== Fictional ==
- Ahmad Kamal Faridi, fictional spy, main character of the Jasoosi Dunya series

== See also ==
- Farid
