= Fazlur Rahman =

Fazlur Rahman, Fazlur Rehman or Fazal-ur-Rehman may refer to:

== Politics ==
- Fazlur Rahman (politician, born 1905) (1905–1966), East Pakistani politician and first Education Minister of Pakistan
- Fazlur Rahman Malik (1919–1988), Pakistani Islamic scholar and political philosopher
- Fazlur Rahman (Bangladeshi politician) (born 1950), Bangladeshi politician
- Fazal-ur-Rehman (politician, born 1953), Pakistani politician
- Fazlur Rehman Khalil (born 1963), Pakistani Islamist politician

== Sport ==
- Fazal-ur-Rehman (cricketer, born 1935), Pakistani cricketer
- Fazalur Rehman (field hockey) (1941–2023), Pakistani field hockey player
- Fazal-ur-Rehman (cricketer, born 1995), Pakistani cricketer

== Other people ==
- Fazlur Rahman Ansari (1914–1974), Pakistani Islamic scholar and philosopher
- Fazlur Rahman Khan (1929–1982), Bangladeshi-American structural engineer
- Fazlur Rahman Faridi (1932–2011), Indian writer on Islam and contemporary issues
- Fazlur Rahman Khan (geologist) (1939–1971), Bangladeshi geologist
- Fazal ur Rehman (judge) (born 1943), Pakistani judge
- Fazlur Rahman Babu (born 1960), Bangladeshi actor and singer
- Fazalur Rehman (civil servant), Pakistani civil servant and caretaker Chief Minister of Sindh, 2018
