= Farid Mansour =

Farid Mansour may refer to:

- Farid Mansour (businessman)
- Farid Mansour (artist)
