= Fatih Abd Al Salam =

Iraqi writer

- Born: Mosul, Iraq
- Education: PhD in Arabic Literature, Department of Arabic Language, Faculty of Arts
- Occupations: Writer, storyteller, novelist, journalist, university professor
- Notable work: The London Eye, Thought is a Profession, When the Whale's Back Warms, The Second Flood

Fatih Abd Al Salam is an Iraqi writer, novelist, storyteller and journalist, born in Mosul. He graduated from the Department of Arabic Language, Faculty of Arts in the University of Mosul. He was assigned as a teaching assistant at the college, then get a master's degree in Arabic literature about a study he presented entitled “The Rural Personality in the Stories of Yusef Idris,” and then he get a doctorate for a thesis he presented entitled “Dialogue in the Iraqi Novel.” His writing career began with writing stories at the end of the 1970s, and he also worked for Al-Zaman International newspaper, then became chief editor of its international edition in London, and moved between many Arab and European countries, and he has a daily column in Al-Zaman International newspaper entitled “Signature”. He has published many books in literature and politics in addition to his fiction and fiction works, and some of his books have been translated into English and Spanish.

== His writings ==
Fatih Abd Al Salam wrote many books that varied between intellectual works, literary studies, novels, novels and anecdotal performances, as:

- (Akher Al lail Awal Al nahar) Late Night Early Day (a collection of short stories): published in 1982 by the Publications of the Social Cultural Center in Mosul.
- (Hai L thekrayat al Toyor) Live for Birds' Memories (a novel): published in 1986.
- Al Sheikh Newton and his cousins (collection of short stories): published in 1986.
- Trains Rising towards the Sky (a collection of short stories): published by the Arab House of Science Publishers in Beirut, the collection contains ten stories of refugees and immigrants who were forced to leave their homelands due to wars and political conflicts. – monkey jump
- (Endma Yskhan Dahr Al Hoot) When the whale's back warms up (a novel): published in 1993.
- (Haleeb Al Theyran) Bulls' Milk (a collection of short stories): published in 1999 by the Arab Institute for Studies and Publishing in Beirut.
- Narrative Dialogue – Its Techniques and Narrative Relationships: issued in 1999 by the Arab Institute for Studies and Publishing in Beirut.
- Discovering a ziggurat: published in 2000 by the Arab Institute for Studies and Publishing in Beirut.
- Narrative Interpretation – Rural Character Discourse in Literature: published in 2001 by the Arab Institute for Studies and Publishing in Beirut.
- Thought is a profession: published in 2004 by the Arab Institute for Studies and Publishing in Beirut.
- The Deranged Mind – Self-criticism between 9/11 and the Iraq War: published in 2010.
- London Eye (collection of short stories): published in 2011 by the Arab House of Science Publishers in Beirut.
- The Second Flood (a novel): published in 2020 by the Arab House of Sciences in Beirut

== Awards ==
The writer Fatih Abd Al-Salam has been honored by many parties in Iraq and the Arab world. He has also received many literary awards, the most important of which are:

- The State Prize for the Novel in Iraq.

== Critics' writings ==
In 2021, Alan Jordanian Publishers and Distributors published a book entitled “Drapes of Narrative: Research on the Achievement of Fateh Abd al-Salam’s Stories,” prepared by researcher Jaafar al-Sheikh Abboush, and it includes a set of critical studies for a number of critics on the literary production of Fateh Abd al-Salam.
