= Amin Abbosh =

Iraqi-Australian electrical and biomedical engineer

- Born: Iraq
- Education: University of Mosul (B.Sc., M.Sc., Ph.D.); The University of Queensland (D.Eng.)
- Known for: Electromagnetic medical imaging, Microwave engineering
- Scientific career
- Fields: Electrical engineering, Biomedical engineering
- Workplaces: University of Queensland

Amin Abbosh is an Iraqi-Australian electrical and biomedical engineer, academic, and scientist. He is a Professor in the School of Electrical Engineering and Computer Science at the University of Queensland (UQ), Australia, and the Director of Electromagnetic Innovations (ƐMAGIN). Abbosh is internationally recognized for his contributions to electromagnetic medical imaging and microwave engineering. In 2022, he was named a Fellow of the IEEE for his contributions to electromagnetic medical imaging.

== Early life and education ==
Abbosh earned a Bachelor of Science in Electrical Engineering, followed by a Master’s degree (1992) and a Doctorate (1997) from the University of Mosul in Iraq. He later obtained a Graduate Certificate in Higher Education (2008) and Doctor of Engineering (D.Eng.) from the University of Queensland in 2012.

== Academic career ==
Abbosh joined the University of Queensland in 2005 and has since held several leadership roles, including:

- Head of the School of Information Technology and Electrical Engineering (ITEE)
- Director of Research and Director of Research Training at UQ
- Director of the Medical Electromagnetic Imaging (MEI) Cooperative Research Centre

He currently leads ƐMAGIN (Electromagnetic Innovations), a research group focused on applied electromagnetics, AI-driven imaging, and next-generation antenna systems.

== Research and contributions ==
Abbosh’s research spans:

- Medical Microwave Imaging: Development of non-invasive, portable imaging systems for detecting strokes, brain injuries, pulmonary edema, liver disease, and skin cancer using safe, non-ionizing electromagnetic waves and AI-driven reconstruction algorithms.
- Microwave and Millimeter-Wave Engineering: Design of advanced antennas, reconfigurable arrays, and wideband devices for healthcare and communication applications.
- Satellite Communication Technologies: Creation of flat-panel, low-cost reconfigurable antennas for LEO satellite broadband, enabling connectivity in remote regions.

He is the chief inventor of more than 20 patents, many licensed to the medical industry, forming the core IP of two Australian companies.

== Publications and impact ==
Abbosh has authored over 600 peer-reviewed papers, with approximately 20,000 citations and an h-index of 70.

== Awards and honors ==
- Fellow of IEEE (2022) for contributions to electromagnetic medical imaging
- IEEE Antennas and Propagation Society King Prize (2016 and 2019)
- UQ Excellence in HDR Supervision Award (2016)
- UQ Entrepreneurship Award (2018)
- Multiple Best Paper Awards at premier IEEE conferences

== Professional service ==
Abbosh is a member of the Australian Research Council College of Experts and has served as a keynote speaker at major international conferences on applied electromagnetics and AI-driven imaging.
