= Layla Salih =

Iraqi archaeologist

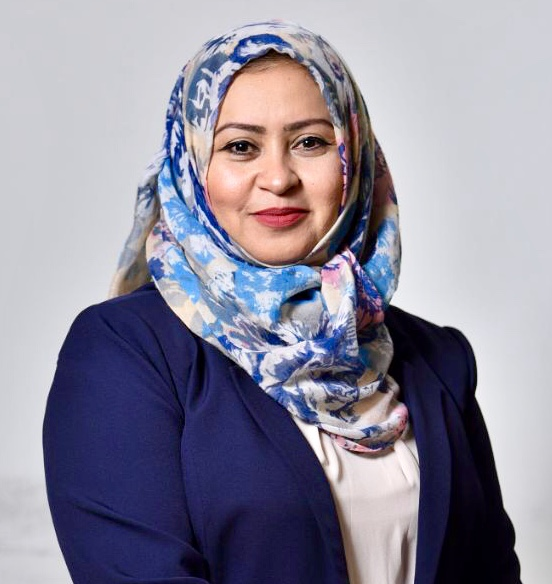

Layla Salih (born 1975) is an Iraqi archaeologist. As head of the Nineveh Antiquities section in the Iraq State Board of Antiquities and Heritage, she has been responsible for the monitoring, rescue, and documentation of Ancient Near Eastern art and architecture following its destruction by ISIS. She is known for her discovery of one of Esarhaddon's palaces in Nineveh.

== Early life ==
Layla Salih was born in Mosul in 1975 in the family of an ex-soldier. She was the fourth of seven sons and six daughters.

She obtained her undergraduate degree in archaeology from the University of Baghdad. During the Iraq War, she completed a master's degree in archaeology. Later, she obtained a PhD from the University of Mosul.

Salih's oldest brother, Nadhim, was killed during the First Battle of al-Faw in 1986. She lost a brother to an al-Qaeda bomb in 2007. In 2011, her sister Khawlah, who was working for the Iraqi government, was shot by militants. When the militant group ISIS occupied Mosul, Salih and her family first evacuated to Kirkuk. She lived in Baghdad for a period, before moving to Erbil. There she joined the office of the provincial governor of Nineveh.

== Career ==
=== Mosul ===
Following her graduation, Salih obtained a role as curator at the Mosul Museum. Just before the 2003 invasion of Iraq, anticipating the destruction of the museum's artifacts, she was tasked with transferring the collections to Baghdad.

Salih was with Mosul Museum till 2009. After ISIS occupied the region in 2014, they emptied much of the museum and began a campaign of destruction of the area's pre-Islamic heritage. Two Assyrian lamassu and a winged lion, each nearly 2 metres tall, which had been the centrepieces of the museum, were destroyed. Ninety-four precious objects of Assyrian history as well as Hellenic works were plundered or wrecked. Salih and others begged ISIS to destroy the tombs and to leave the buildings intact, but the militants did not spare either the tombs or the buildings.

=== Nimrud ===
ISIS was driven out of Nineveh province in November 2016. Salih and a colleague, Faisal Jaber, investigated and reported on the destruction of Christian sites in the province. Next, Salih was tasked with examining the scale of the damage wrought on the monuments in Nimrud. At the time, she was the only antiquities official able to survey the scene, as nearly 50 other Iraqi archaeologists remained trapped in ISIS-controlled Mosul. Salih estimated that about 60 percent of the site was irredeemable, but she also felt that because a lot of the wreckage remained on location, much could be restored. A joint committee of Unesco and the governor of Nineveh agreed to reinstate funding for a rebuilding of the site. But the monuments and ruins remained unprotected, and open to looters. Salih asked the Iraqi militias to preserve as much of Nimrud as possible.

=== Nineveh ===
In 2017, Salih began to document the destruction to the monuments in Nineveh. Beneath the Nabi Yunus shrine, her team found that ISIS had dug tunnels and broken into a hitherto unknown palace in search of antiquities to plunder and sell. Worried about the structural integrity of the walls, ISIS had left the area untouched. Salih discovered a cuneiform inscription of Esarhaddon, dating back to about 672 BC. The king's name does not appear in the inscription, but phrases separately identified with him do, and it describes his reconstruction of Babylon, previously destroyed by Sennacherib, his father. The team also found statues of an Assyrian goddess sprinkling the "water of life" on her devotees. In contrast to previously known reliefs in which figures were depicted in profile, these were in frontal pose. Salih also discovered two alabaster lamassu.

Salih reported that more than a hundred items of pottery, which were likely taken from the Nabi Yunus tunnels by ISIS, were recovered from a house in Mosul.

== Selected publications ==
- Jeber, Faisal; Salih, Layla. "Damages Initial Assessment for Cultural Heritage in Nineveh Governorate" (PDF).
