= Karim Findi =

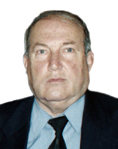
- Karim Findi (Abdulkareem Findi)
- Born: 4 May 1946 (age 79); Qarqarava, Duhok, Kurdistan Region - Iraq
- Citizenship: Iraq
- Occupations: author, Journalist & Kurdish writer
- Years active: 1969–present
- Notable work: Chapters of the Aylol revolution in Iraqi Kurdistan
- Website: Official Website of Findi

Karim Findi (1946, Duhok, Kurdistan Region - Iraq) is an author and Kurdish writer. In 1974 he graduated at University of Mosul – College of Arts English Dept.

He has published books on numerous subjects, including politics, geography, language, literature and history in different languages like English, Kurdish, Arabic.

He was one of the founders of the Kurdistan Journalists Syndicate.

In 1997 he was editor-in-chief of the magazine Karwan, which was issued by the Ministry of Culture. He was a secretary of Karwan Academic magazine issued by Ministry of Culture, Kurdistan Region. He served as editor-in-chief of the magazine Dijla from its inception through its final issue (No. 42), which was the first magazine in a roman-alphabet language issued by the Kurdistan Ministry of Culture.

== Published books ==
-A Collection of Bakir bag Al-Arizee poems, collected and analyzed, 1982, (Kurdish Edition).

-Mairo, transliterated from Latin letters into Arabic letters, 1985, (Kurdish Edition).

-Gulchin, transliterated from Akleerky into Arabic letters, 1988, (Kurdish Edition).

-Chapters of Eylul Revolution in Kurdistan - Iraq written, 1995 (Arabic Edition).

- Guide of Duhok Governorate, 1997. (Arabic and English Edition)

-Kurdish tribes in the north part of Mossel state, 1996. translated from English into Kurdish. (Kurdish Edition)

-Khani Festival, prepared, 1996, (Kurdish Edition).

-Amedi in different eras, critics and analyses, 1997, (Arabic Edition)

-(P.D.K) During Barzani's Absence (1946-1958), 1998, (Arabic Edition).

-The Golden Jubilee of Peshmarge. 1999. Transliterated from southern into northern (Kirmanji) Dialect and from Arabic letters to latini letters. (Kurdish Edition).

-Barzani never gives up, 2001. transliterated from Arabic letters of Southern Kirmanji to Latin letters Northern Kirmanji.

-Badinan Castle and Some of its Historical Places, 2012, (Arabic Edition).

-Badinan Castle ,2012, Arabic language.

-Kurdish Language in Badinan region, 2012, (Arabic and Kurdish Edition).
