= Adnan Koucher =

Iraqi scholar

Adnan Koucher (Arabic: عدنان كوجر ) is an Iraqi scholar.

Adnan Koucher was born and grew up in Mosul, Iraq. After obtaining B.Sc. degree from the Faculty of Agriculture & Forestry at the University of Mosul, he went to the UK and obtained MSc degree in Rural Social Development from the University of Reading in 1984.

== Career ==
For several years he worked as a lecturer in the Faculty of Agriculture at the University of Salahaddin in Arbil, Iraq. In 1996, he left Iraq for the Netherlands and joined the Third World Centre at the University of Nijmegen as a Research Fellow in development studies. His research resulted in obtaining a Ph.D. degree in Social Sciences from the University of Radboud-Nijmegen.

In 1999 he began his work as a Director of Research at Hogeschool Van Hall Larenstein until 2004 when he became in charge of the Master Studies Programme of International Agriculture at Larenstein university, now part of the Wageningen University and Research Centre. His interest in initiating academic collaboration with academic institutions in Arab countries resulted in a joint MSc course in International Agriculture with the University of Cairo in Egypt as well as professional training courses in GIS with the Royal Jordanian Geographic Centre in Jordan.

He participated in various development projects in Asia and Africa. His interest in the issues of globalisation, governance and NGO’s is reflected in his contribution to several scientific conferences worldwide.

== Works ==
He is the author of State and Society: The Question of Agrarian Change in Iraq 1921-1991 (ISBN 388156716X)
