= Misha Geller =

Russian composer

Michael Lazarevich "Misha" Geller (Russian: Михаил Ла́заревич Геллер) (23 July 1937 in Moscow – 17 December 2007 in Vught) was a Russian viola player and composer.

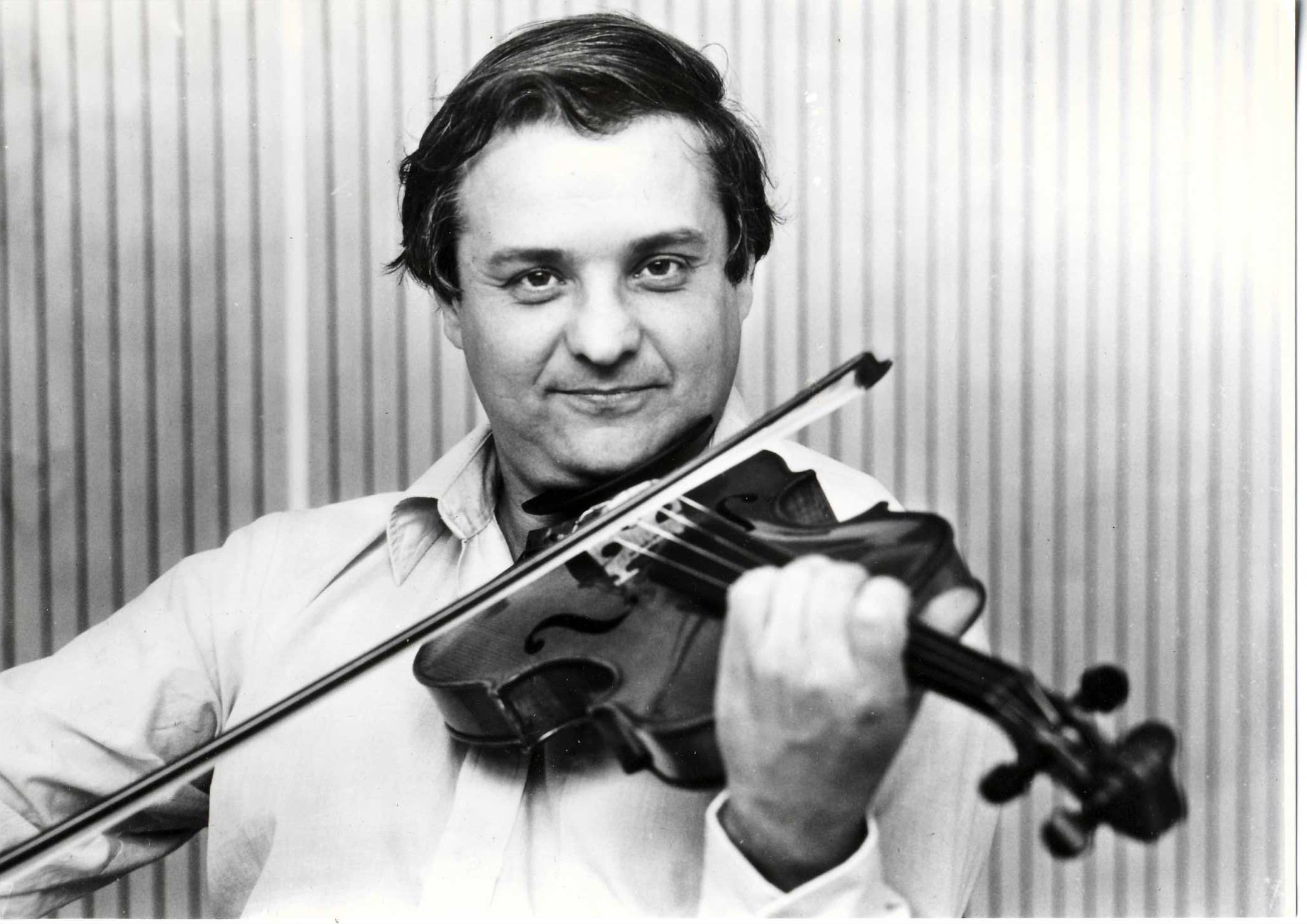
Misha Geller

== Moscow years (1937–1978) ==
Geller was born in Moscow in 1937 in a Jewish family. He started to play the violin at the age of 7, but later on he developed a passion for the viola. He graduated from the Moscow Conservatory in 1963 as a viola player and composer. He studied composition with Professor Evgeny Golubev and Alfred Schnittke (orchestration).

As a viola player he was awarded the Gold Medal at the International Competition in Helsinki (1962). In 1966 he was a founding member of the Composer's Union String Quartet, together with Alexander Arenkow (violin), Dimitri Ferschtman (cello) and Sergei Pischugin (violin). When Russian string quartets have achieved international recognition they are given the name of a great Russian composer. The group won the First Prize at the International String Quartet Competition in Liège, Belgium in 1969 and the name Glinka was bestowed on them. With the Glinka Quartet Geller performed in many countries around the world, made a large number of records and recorded for radio and television.

From 1968 up until his emigration in 1978 he was a member of the Union of Soviet Composers. He obtained commissions from the Russian Broadcasting Corporation to compose for the Radio Philharmonic Orchestra and other symphony orchestras and to create chamber music, vocal cycles and a filmed opera for television titled The Women's Revolt with the cast of the Bolshoi Theatre, conducted by Mark Ermler.

Especially acclaimed was his Sonata for Violin and Piano (1969), which was dedicated to its first performers: violinist Aleksey Mikhlin (the Gold Medal winner of the Queen Elizabeth Competition in Brussels in 1963) and Georgian pianist Tsiala Kvernadze (Russian: Циала Квернадзе), laureate of the Vianna da Motta International Music Competition in Lisbon in 1964). This composition was published by the Union of Soviet Composers in 1976 and the record label Melodiya produced a record with this composition. Music critic N. Dolinsky is cited on the cover of the record: " …This composition is put together in a very modern fashion, as if written in a new language, full of expression and drama. The whole piece is constructed like a precise, graphical drawing, where every line, every hatching has its own distinct character… The monologues of the violin are particularly remarkable. They seem to fix your attention on the intense intellectual and creative process of the composer."

== Life and work in the Netherlands (1978–1994) ==
In 1978 Geller and his family moved to the Netherlands. From 1978–1980 he played with the Netherlands Chamber Orchestra as their principal violinist.

In 1980 he became a member of the re-formed Glinka Quartet together with Dimitri Ferschtman (cello), Zino Vinnikov (violin) and Kees Hulsman (violin), which successfully performed and recorded around the world.

Geller gave solo performances as a viola player and played with many European Orchestras. His most memorable performances were of Mozart´s Symphony Concertante with the violinist Jean-Jacques Kantorow and of Berlioz´s Harold in Italy. The Rhein -Zeitung in Germany wrote about his performance there in 1982: He played with an exceptional delicacy of phrasing… conveying deep warmth and burning inspiration.

He took part in the performances of his own compositions, such as the duet for viola and cello Psalm Music for 8 Strings (D. Ferschtman, cello) with premiere at the Concertgebouw in Amsterdam in 1979. The duet was also played by various European musicians and recorded in the Netherlands, Germany and France. Geller's performance of Fantasy for viola and piano (1980) was recorded with different pianists by several Dutch broadcasting organisations: KRO, VARA, AVRO.

1982 saw the premiere of his Dialogue for Viola and 12 instruments with the Dutch Radio Chamber Orchestra, conductor Ernest Bour.

Geller composed for chamber ensembles, e.g. the String Quintet in commission of the Johan Wagenaar Foundation in the Netherlands (1984). His compositions were performed in the UK, Croatia, France, Belgium, Germany and Switzerland.

He held teaching posts at the University Colleges for the Arts in Amsterdam and Utrecht at the Royal Northern College of Music in Manchester. He served on the juries of several competitions such as The Julius Isserlis Scholarship of the Royal Philharmonic Society in England and gave Master Classes in Germany and the UK.

His successful career as a violist was abruptly ended by a sudden stroke. He was forced to stop performing, which led to his emotional decision to stop teaching as well.

== Second career: traditional Chinese medicine (1992–1997) ==
After being forced to give up his career as a viola player, Misha Geller devoted himself to his other passion: Traditional Chinese Medicine. He graduated from The International Acupuncture Institute in Hong Kong proficient in the ancient Chinese art of healing: Qigong. He worked as a doctor of acupuncture first in the Netherlands and later in Israel, where he was invited to work in co-operation with the Medical Insurance Leumit Health Fund (1994–1997).

In the winter of 1997 Geller was struck by another severe stroke. He was forced to stop working and to get more rest.

== Back to the Netherlands (1998–2007) ==
He returned to the Netherlands, recovered remarkably well from the physical effects of his stroke and started composing again. He worked as a composer full-time and from 2003 onward he actively took part in the realization of his own musical projects.

His musical fairy-tale for children Mishka saw an enthusiastic reception in 2003.

His Chamber Opera The Daughters of Lot (An Intimate Treatment of the Sacred Pages, libretto in English by Sandra Geller) for baritone, soprano, mezzo-soprano, piano and percussion is a personal vision on this episode in the Book of Genesis, featuring Lot, his wife and his daughters as the characters in a drama that enlivens the history of mankind. Performances took place in 2003 in churches and cathedrals throughout the Netherlands.

Misha Geller has always been inspired by the magic of the visual arts. For the program Homage to Marc Chagall he composed Trio for Piano, Violin and Cello and Russian Fantasy for cello and piano. His Ballad for Chamber Orchestra was inspired by the watercolors of Dutch – French painter Ary Scheffer. De fresco's of Piero della Francesca are the décor for his Opera – Ballet The Death of Adam and his oratorio Solomon.

Geller's admiration for Francisco de Goya is expressed in his composition for viola and piano Goya's Caprichos, where music leads you into the fascinating world of Goya's sinister masquerade.

The Garden of Earthly Delights of Hieronymus Bosch is reflected in his composition Nebo for viola, piano and accordion. These two compositions were performed, accompanied by video impressions of the works of Goya and Bosch in the program Image, Mysticism & Music.

Famous images from Russian fairy-tales were shown as a video impression during the performance of Geller's composition for clarinet and piano Russian Fairy-tales.

His Chamber Opera Narcissus based on Ovid's myth of Narcissus, was inspired by Salvador Dalí's painting Metamorphosis of Narcissus (libretto in English by Sandra Geller)

Geller's music also reflects his interest in literature and poetry. He composed romances on Russian, Bulgarian and Japanese poems. For the music theatre production Requiem for a Poet he composed music inspired by the poetry of Osip Mandelstam and Marina Tsvetaeva in Dutch translation by Charles B. Timmer. His Symphony is inspired by The Old Man and the Sea, the novella by Ernest Hemingway. Chamber Comic Opera Madam Popov, is based on the story of Anton Chekhov The Bear (with libretto in English, written by composer).

The duet The Royal Bee is an expressive musical story, inspired by the phenomenon of the queen bee.

The premiere of his String Quartet Flashback, performed by the German Rubin Quartet in 2007, was the last performance attended by the composer.

Michael Geller died suddenly in December 2007 in his home in Vught, Netherlands.

== Overview of compositions ==
=== Operas ===
- The Women's Revolt. Comic opera in 5 episodes based on the stories by Mikhail Sholokhov (ca. 60 min), Libretto in Russian: C. Zenin
- The Daughters of Lot (an Intimate Treatment of the Sacred Pages). Chamber opera in 5 episodes based on the Old Testament and inspired by the Biblical drawings by Marc Chagall (ca. 70 min), Libretto in English: Sandra Geller
- Narcissus. A Chamber Opera in One Act based on Ovid's myth of Narcissus and inspired by Salvador Dalí's Metamorphosis of Narcissus (ca. 75 min), Libretto in English: Sandra Geller
- Madame Popov. Comic opera based on the one – act play by Anton Chekhov The Bear (ca. 70 min), Libretto in English: Michael L. Geller
- The Death of Adam. Opera – ballet, inspired by the fresco of Piero della Francesca in Arezzo, Italy: The Death of Adam

=== Oratorio ===
- MAGNIFICAT: Solomon, the King. Oratorio for Baritone mixed Choir and Orchestra. The composition is inspired by the fresco of Piero della Francesco in Arezetto, Italy: The Meeting of Solomon and the Queen of Sheba(Ca 30 min.) Text in English: Sandra Geller

=== Orchestral works ===
- Divertimento for Violin and Orchestra
- Concerto for Violin, Piano and Orchestra
- Dialog for Viola and Chamber Orchestra
- Ballad Concertante for Chamber Orchestra
- The Royal Bee Concertante for Flute (Violin) and String Orchestra
- Goya's Los Caprichos (Homage to Francisco Goya) for Clarinet (Viola) and 12 instruments
- Concertante for Bassoon and Chamber Orchestra
- Mishka. Musical Theatre for Children
- Symphony The Old Man and the Sea for Orchestra, inspired by the novel of Ernest Hemingway.

=== Vocal cycles ===
- Romances on the texts of Japanese Poems for Soprano and Piano
- Romances on the texts of Bulgarian poems for Soprano and Piano
- Composition for Male Choir on the texts of two poems by Jevgeni Baratynski in Dutch translation of Peter Zeeman
- Requiem for a Poet for Soprano, Baritone, Violin, Cello and Piano (Music Theatre based on the poems and memoirs by the Russian Poets Marina Tsvetaeva and Osip Mandelstam in Dutch translation of Charles B. Timmer).

=== Chamber music ===
- Psalm Music for 8 strings
- Duo for Viola and Cello
- Sonata for Violin and Piano
- Fantasy for Viola and Piano
- Russian Fantasy for Cello and Piano
- The Royal Bee for Flute (Violin) and Piano
- Russian Fairy-tales for Clarinet and Piano
- Goya's Los Caprichos for Viola (Clarinet) and Piano
- NEBO for Viola, Accordion and Piano
- KWINTET for two Violins, two Violas and Cello
- Flashback. String Quartet
- Chagall. Trio for Violin, Cello and Piano
