= K. M. Abdus Salam =

K. M. Abdus Salam retired civil servant and former senior secretary of the Bangladesh Parliament Secretariat. He is a former secretary of the Ministry of Labour and Employment. He was the director general of NGO Affairs Bureau.

== Career ==
In 1989, Salam joined the Bangladesh Civil Service as a cadre of the administrative branch.

Salam was the secretary of the Rajshahi City Corporation. He was a director of the prime minister's office under Prime Minister Sheikh Hasina.

Salam was the director general of the NGO Affairs Bureau from 2018 to 2020. He worked on coordination between non-government organizations working with the Rohingya refugees in Bangladesh.

In 2021, Salam was the secretary of the Ministry of Labour and Employment. He had to ensure garment workers could work during the lockdown due to the COVID-19 pandemic in Bangladesh and had himself caught COVID-19. In July 2021, he provided compensation to workers affected by the Hashem Foods factory fire.

On 28 July 2021, he was appointed secretary of the Bangladesh Parliament Secretariat replacing Zafar Ahmed Khan. He was promoted to senior secretary and reappointed in his position in September 2022 on a one-year contractual appointment. He was a member of the Association of Secretaries General of Parliaments. He administered the oath ceremony of members of parliament Pran Gopal Datta and Nilufar Anjum. He administered the oath of members of parliament Abdus Sattar Bhuiyan, AKM Rezaul Karim Tansen, Hafiz Uddin Ahmed, Md Abdul Wadud, Md Ziaur Rahman, and Ragebul Ahsan. He and Shirin Sharmin Chaudhury, speaker of the parliament, had to declare the seat of Md. Anwarul Azim Anar vacant after he was killed in India. He face complications with the process as the body of the lawmaker had not been recovered. He administered the oath of Mohammad A. Arafat.

After the fall of the Sheikh Hasina led Awami League, Salam's contractual appointed as senior secretary of the Bangladesh Parliament Secretariat was terminated on 15 August 2024.
