= Abdus Salam (newscaster) =

Pakistani newscaster

- عبدالسلام
- Born: 1925; Ajmer Sharif, British India
- Died: 2 July 1992 (aged 66–67)
- Occupations: Radio and TV newscaster
- Years active: 1950s - 1992
- Television: PTV
- Awards: Pride of Performance Award by the President of Pakistan (1994); Nigar Award; (1988)

Abdus Salam (1925 – 2 July 1992) was a Pakistani newscaster at Radio Pakistan and Pakistan Television. He was posthumously awarded the Pride of Performance in 1994.

== Life and career ==
Salam was born to a lower middle-class family in 1925 in Ajmer Sharif, British India. He migrated to Pakistan after the Indo-Pak Independence.

Initially, he joined Radio Pakistan, Hyderabad, as a technical operator. But later, he became successful as a news reader. He also worked for Pakistan Television as an Urdu news presenter from 1977 to 1989.

== Death ==
On 29 June 1992, Salam was hit by a motorcycle when he was leaving the Radio Pakistan station for home after recording the night's news bulletin. Due to severe injuries, he died on 2 July 1992, after remaining in a coma for two days.

== Awards and recognition ==
- Salam received the Nigar Award for best newscaster in 1988.
- Salam was posthumously awarded the Pride of Performance in 1994.
- After his accidental death, Radio Pakistan added a recording of his opening voice as a permanent part of its main bulletin to pay a tribute to his services in the field of broadcasting.
