= Morad Fareed =

Association footballer (born 1979)

Personal information
- Date of birth: 14 September 1979 (age 47)
- Place of birth: New York State, U.S.

International career
| Years | Team | Apps | (Gls) |
| 2004 | Palestine | | |

Morad Fareed (born 14 September 1979) is a former professional athlete.

== Career ==
Born in New York State, Fareed was a member of the first Palestine national team in its attempt to qualify for the 2006 FIFA World Cup. Although Palestine did not qualify for the World Cup, Fareed appeared in one preliminary match against Iraq on 16 November 2004. He was featured in the 2006 film Goal Dreams, a documentary directed by Maya Sanbar and Jeffrey Saunders that follows the Palestinian national team in their attempt to qualify for the World Cup.
