= Farid Nazerfasihi =

- Born: 1 May 1984 (age 41); Iran
- Occupation: Visual effects supervisor
- Years active: 2003-present

Farid Nazerfasihi (Persian: فرید ناظر فصیحی; born on May 1, 1984, in Tehran) is an Iranian visual effects supervisor and VFX producer. Farid is the winner of the Crystal Simorgh award for the best visual special effects of the 36th Fajr International Film Festival for the movie Istanbul Junction and Ablagh.

== Life and activities ==
Farid Nazerfasihi was born on May 1, 1984. He completed a Bachelor's Degree in the field of animation in Tehran, Iran. Commencing his professional career in cinema with the movie entitled "Crime" since 2003-2004. In addition Farid Nazerfasihi is also an instructor at Pars University of Art and Architecture and an official member of the Board of Directors of House of Cinema Visual Effects Guild.

== Works ==
=== Filmography - Visual Effects Supervisor / VFX Producer ===
- No Choice Directed by Reza Dormishian - 2020
- Bi Saro Seda Directed by Majid Reza Mostafavi - 2023
- Hard Shell Directed by Majid Reza Mostafavi – 2023
- World War III - Directed by Houman Seyyedi – 2022
- A Hero – Directed by Asghar Farhadi – 2021
- Instinct – Directed by Siavash Assadi – 2021
- Ablagh - Directed by Narges Abyar – 2020
- When the Moon Was Full - Directed by Narges Abyar – 2019
- Symphony No.9 - Directed by Mohammad-Reza Honarmand – 2019
- Selfie with Democracy - Directed by Ali Atshani – 2018
- The worker Bee – Directed by Afshin Sadeghi – 2018
- Sagband – Directed by Mehran Ahmadi – 2018
- Confiscation - Directed by Mehran Ahmadi – 2018
- Istanbul Junction - Directed by Mostafa Kiaei – 2018
- Rahman 1400 - Directed by Manouchehr Hadi – 2017
- Jandar - Directed by Hossein Amiri Domari and Pedram Pouramiri – 2017
- Darkhongah - Directed by Siavash Assadi – 2017
- Wing Mirror - Directed by Manouchehr Hadi – 2017
- Disappearance - Directed by Ali Asgari – 2017
- Fish Lake - Directed by Maryam Doosti – 2016
- Forty Buddies - Directed by Sadegh Sadeghdaghighi – 2016
- Breath - Directed by Narges Abyar – 2016
- Season of Narges - Directed by Negar Azarbaijani – 2015
- Abji - Directed by Marjan Ashrafizadeh – 2015
- Immortal - Directed by Seyyed Hadi Mohaghegh – 2015
- Endless Light - Directed by Mostafa Soltani – 2015
- Fox - Directed by Behrouz Afkhami – 2014
- Sharafnaz - Directed by Hassan Najafi – 2014
- Borderless - Directed by Amir Hossein Asgari – 2014
- Track 143 - Directed by Narges Abyar – 2013
- Unripe Pomegranates - Directed by Majidreza Mostafavi – 2013
- Bardou - Directed by Seyyed Hadi Mohaghegh – 2013

=== Series ===
- Picolo - Directed by Ali Ahmadi – 2023
- Khatoon - Directed by Tina Pakravan – 2021
- Set Me Free - Directed by Sharhram Shahhosseini – 2022
- Turkish Coffee - Directed by Alireza Amini – 2023
- Capital Season 5 & 6 - Directed by Sirous Moghaddam – 2018 - 2019
- Doping - Directed by Reza Maghsoudi - 2020
- Accomplice - Directed by Mostafa Kiaee – 2020

== Awards and honours ==
- 40th Fajr International Film Festival, Candidate Best Visual Effects – Beyro, 2021
- 39th Fajr International Film Festival, Winner Best Visual Effects – Ablagh, 2020
- 36th Fajr Film Festival, Winner Best Visual Effects – Istanbul Junction, 2018
- 20th The House of Cinema Awards, Winner Best Visual Effects – Istanbul Junction, 2018
- 18th Hafez Awards, Winner Best Visual Effects – Istanbul Junction, 2018
- 7th International City Film Festival – Honors Diploma - Istanbul Junction, 2018
- 34th Fajr Film Festival, Nominated Best Visual Effects – Breath, 2016
- 19th The House of Cinema Awards, Nominated Best Visual Effects – Breath, 2016
- 21st The House of Cinema Awards, Nominated Best Visual Effects – When The Moon Was Full, 2019
