= Farid Wajdi =

Member of the Judicial Commission of Indonesia
- In office 2015–2020
- President: Joko Widodo
- Preceded by: Imam Anshori Saleh

Personal details
- Citizenship: Indonesian

Farid Wajdi is a member and current spokesperson for the Judicial Commission of Indonesia. Wajdi has publicly pushed for greater checks and balances on the Judiciary of Indonesia.
