= Iosif Andriasov =

Russian composer of Armenian descent (1933–2000)

Iosif Arshakovich Andriasov, also Ovsep Andreasian (Russian: Ио́сиф Арша́кович Андриа́сов; 7 April 1933 in Moscow – 16 November 2000 in New York City), was a composer-symphonist, a moral philosopher, and a teacher.

Iosif Andriasov was born in Moscow on April 7, 1933, to an Armenian family. He is a graduate of Moscow Conservatory, where he studied composition with Professor Evgeny Golubev. In 1964 Andriasov became a member of the Union of Soviet Composers on the recommendation of Dmitri Shostakovich, from whom his music obviously is inspired, whilst still maintaining an original quality.

The Head of the Armenian-Gregorian Church, Vazgen I, Catolikos of All Armenians, awarded Iosif Andriasov the Special Charter with Recognition and Blessing for his contributions to music and ethics. In 1974 for his Second Symphony, Iosif Andriasov won the Soviet Composers' Competition to represent Soviet music at the USSR National Celebration. Iosif Andriasov received many international awards in recognition of his services to music and ethics.

Andriasov was married to musicologist Marta Leonidovna Kudryashova-Andriasova.

== Selected works ==
- String Quartet, Op.1
- Musical Sketch for Flute and String Orchestra, Op.4
- Piano Trio, Op. 7
- Symphony No. 1, Op. 12
- Clarinet Concertino, Op. 27
- Spring, for String Quartet, Op.32
