= Farid Melgani =

Farid Melgani is an engineer at the University of Trento, Italy. He was named a Fellow of the Institute of Electrical and Electronics Engineers (IEEE) in 2016 for his contributions to image analysis in remote sensing.
