= Farid Ibrahim =

Egyptian footballer (born 1998)

Farid Ibrahim فريد إبراهيم
Personal information
- Full name: Farid Ibrahim Farid
- Date of birth: 1 March 1998 (age 28)
- Place of birth: Egypt
- Position: Winger

Youth career
- –2017: Al Ahli

Senior career*
Years	Team	Apps	(Gls)
2017–2020	Al Ahli	12	(1)
2020–2021	Al-Wakrah	2	(0)
2021–2022	Al-Kharaitiyat	1	(0)
2022	Al Bidda		
2022–2023	Umm Salal	7	(0)
2024–2025	Lusail		
- * Club domestic league appearances and goals

Farid Ibrahim Farid (Arabic:فريد إبراهيم فريد; born 1 March 1998) is an Egyptian footballer who plays as a winger.

== Career ==
Farid Ibrahim started his career at Al Ahli and is a product of the Al-Ahli's youth system. On 30 September 2017, Fareed Ebrahim made his professional debut for Al-Ahli against Umm Salal in the Pro League, replacing Abdulla Afifa.
