= Farid Chenoune =

French fashion historian (1949–2024)

Farid Chenoune (8 October 1949 – 8 November 2024) was a French scholar, writer, and journalist specialising in the history and sociology of fashion.

== Biography ==
Farid Chenoune was born on 8 October 1949 in Boulogne-Billancourt, France, into a modest bourgeois family of Kabyle origin. His father, Hocine, held various administrative jobs, while his mother, Suzanne Marchellier, worked as a theater and film actress.

Initially a professor of French literature, Chenoune transitioned to fashion journalism, contributing to publications like Libération, Vogue, Mixt(e) (where he was editor-in-chief), and Le Monde d'Hermès.

Chenoune worked as a professor at the Institut Français de la Mode (IFM) and the École Nationale Supérieure des Arts Décoratifs (ENSAD). He also taught at the École de la Chambre Syndicale de la Couture Parisienne and collaborated with the University of the Arts London.

He died on 8 November 2024 of cancer, at the age of 75.

== Work ==
Des Modes et des Hommes, published in 1993, marked the first comprehensive history of men's fashion in France. The book traced the evolution of menswear from the French Revolution onward, challenging the common belief that men's fashion only took shape in the 1980s. Translated into English as A History of Men’s Fashion, it received positive reviews from critics.

He also co-authored the catalog for the Yves Saint Laurent retrospective at the Petit Palais in 2010, which won the Grand Prix du Livre de Mode.

== Publications ==
- A History of Men's Fashion. 1993.
- Jean Paul Gaultier. 1996.
- Brioni, Universe of Fashion. 1998.
- Beneath it All: A Century of French Lingerie. 1999.
- Carried Away: All About Bags. 2004.
- Dior: 60 Years of Style. 2007.
- Yves Saint Laurent. 2010.
- Impressions Dior: Dior et l'impressionnisme. 2013.
- Éloge de la mode: La Bruyère, Wilde, Cocteau, Dior. 2015.

== See also ==
- Dress code
- Haute Couture
