= Farid Zhangirov =

Russian footballer and coach

Personal information
- Full name: Farid Ismagilovich Zhangirov
- Date of birth: 15 May 1966 (age 60)
- Place of birth: Tolyatti, Russian SFSR
- Height: 1.70 m (5 ft 7 in)
- Positions: Forward; midfielder

Senior career*
Years	Team	Apps	(Gls)
1983–1985	FC Torpedo Togliatti	72	(12)
1986–1987	FC Dynamo Kirov	55	(12)
1988	FC Torpedo Togliatti	17	(4)
1988–1989	FC Zenit Leningrad	7	(0)
1989–1991	FC Uralmash Yekaterinburg	81	(10)
1991–1994	FC Lada Togliatti	81	(9)
1995	FC Lada Dimitrovgrad	18	(0)
1997–1998	FC Lada-Togliatti-VAZ Togliatti	17	(1)

Managerial career
- 1998: FC Lada-Togliatti-VAZ Togliatti (assistant)
- 2003: FC Kaisar (assistant)
- 2009: FC Kyzylzhar (assistant)
- 2013: FC Lada Togliatti (academy)
- * Club domestic league appearances and goals

Farid Ismagilovich Zhangirov (Russian: Фарид Исмагилович Жангиров; born 15 May 1966) is a Russian football coach and a former player.
