= Farid Ahmed (publisher) =

- ফরিদ আহমেদ
- Born: 9 August; Mymensingh, Bangladesh
- Education: University of Dhaka
- Occupations: Publisher, writer, television presenter
- Known for: Founder and proprietor of Somoy Prokashon

Farid Ahmed is a Bangladeshi creative publisher, non-fiction writer, and television presenter. He is the founder and proprietor of Somoy Prokashon, one of the preeminent publishing houses in Bangladesh. He served as the central president of the Academic and Creative Publishers Association of Bangladesh and was the key pioneer behind the inception of the first 'Bangladesh Book Fair' in Kolkata in 2011.

== Early life and education ==
Ahmed was born in Mymensingh, Bangladesh, to Md. Golam Hossain and Emrun Nesa. He completed his secondary education at the historic City Collegiate School, Mymensingh (founded in 1883 by Anandamohan Bose). During his school years, he actively participated in cultural competitions, recitation, theatre, and sports, training at the inter-district junior football coaching camp.

He pursued his higher secondary education at Ananda Mohan Government College. He later moved to Dhaka for higher studies and earned his Bachelor of Science (Honors) and Master of Science degrees in zoology from the University of Dhaka.

== Cultural and organizational life ==
During his youth, Ahmed trained in Hawaiian guitar under the prominent Mymensingh musician Samir Chandra Cotton. He performed as an assistant instrumentalist alongside Cotton at various cultural venues, notably providing background score support for live theatre and performing in a solo concert by Rabindra Sangeet singer Fahmida Khatun. He also accompanied Cotton on guitar during a grand musical evening hosted by the Mymensingh district administration for the noted vocalist Mitali Mukherjee.

Ahmed co-founded a community library with his classmates during his school days. He served as an officer for the Mymensingh branch of the national youth organization 'Chander Hat' and later became its district convener during his college years. Upon moving to Dhaka, he was inducted into the central executive committee of Chander Hat. It was during this period that he began writing non-fiction articles for the youth magazine Kishore Bangla.

== Career ==
=== Media and television ===
In the late 1980s, encouraged by the children's writer and media personality Ali Imam, Ahmed debuted as a television presenter on Bangladesh Television (BTV). From 1987 to 1992, he regularly hosted and scripted outdoor development programs, family planning documentaries, and science and sports-related shows across Bangladesh. Following the launch of Channel i, he hosted several programs dedicated to books and literature for several years.

=== Publishing and Somoy Prokashon ===
Ahmed established an office named 'Adhuna' at Dhanmondi Road 4. In 1987, in collaboration with the national poet Shamsur Rahman, he published a high-quality quarterly literary magazine titled Adhuna, with Rahman as the chief editor and Ahmed as the publisher.

To sustain the institutional costs of the magazine and venture into alternative media, Ahmed entered the publishing trade under Rahman's guidance. The venture began with the publication of translated paperback editions of foreign books, translated by poet Abu Kaisar. He subsequently relocated his operations to Sheikh Shaheb Bazar, a prominent printing hub at the time, where he established a large-scale manual lead-type composition section. Due to the short market shelf-life of paperbacks, Ahmed decided to shift towards permanent creative book publications.

Consequently, on 9 August 1989, Ahmed formally launched his independent publishing house, Somoy Prokashon. The house made its debut at the Amar Ekushey Boimela in 1990. Under his editorial direction, Somoy Prokashon published early definitive works by major contemporary authors including Syed Shamsul Haq, Humayun Ahmed, Muhammad Zafar Iqbal, Imdadul Haq Milan, and Taslima Nasrin. He oversaw the publication of monumental national reference works, including the 12-volume Muktijuddho Kosh (Encyclopedia of the Bangladesh Liberation War) edited by Muntassir Mamoon. To date, the house has published over 2,000 titles.

=== Organizational leadership ===
Ahmed has held several apex leadership roles in the Bangladeshi publication industry. He served as the General Secretary (2011–2013) and twice as the central President (2018–2020 and 2020–2022) of the Academic and Creative Publishers Association of Bangladesh. He served three terms as a General Body Member of the Federation of Bangladesh Chambers of Commerce and Industry (FBCCI) between 2010 and 2017. Since 2016, he has been the convener of the weekly literary circle at Bishwo Shahitto Kendro.

He has been a member of the Amar Ekushey Book Fair Organizing Committee multiple times and has served on the selection boards for the Department of Public Libraries and the National Book Centre under the Ministry of Cultural Affairs.

== International activities ==
Ahmed represented Bangladesh officially at the Frankfurt Book Fair in 2018 and 2019, and displayed books through Somoy Prokashon at the Gothenburg International Book Fair, Sweden, in 2016. He was the primary pioneer behind launching the historic 'Bangladesh Book Fair' in Kolkata in 2011. He has also regularly participated in international book fairs and seminars across London, New York, Toronto, and New Delhi.

== Bibliography ==
- Prokashoknama o Humayun Ahmed (Memoir, 2017)
- Tusharrajjo Kashmir o Bhutan (Travelogue, 2018)
- Humayun Ahmed-er Uttoradhikari Nirdharon (Memoir, 2018)

== See also ==
- Somoy Prokashon
