= Farid Majari =

German cultural director (1958–2023)

Farid Majari (also spelled Fareed) (12 August 1958 – 8 April 2023) was a German cultural manager and film producer.

== Biography ==
Majari was born the son of an Iranian father in Marburg, West Germany, and died at age 64 in Tucson, Arizona. After having joined the German Cultural Center – Goethe-Institut – in Munich, Majari served as director of the institute's branch offices in Moscow, Russian Federation, Ramallah, Palestine, Beirut, Lebanon, as well in Abu Dhabi, UAE, and in Los Angeles, USA.

While working in Ramallah, he produced and co-wrote the 10-part TV series Matabb (Speed Bump), set in Ramallah in the West Bank. Directed by Palestinian film director George Khleifi, the series presented an entertaining story of intrigue, romance and crime, as well as the Israeli occupation and was centred around a fictitious Palestinian non-governmental organisation. The series had been scheduled for Ramadan 2008 by the public television channel, Palestine Broadcasting Corporation (PBC), but was cancelled shortly before the planned start. PCB justified the canellationl of Matabb by saying that they wanted to ensure "that no scenes that could be offensive to one side or the other". They took this decision, after a committee had reviewed all ten episodes and come to the conclusion that some scenes needed to be changed.

In May 2009, Majari participated in an international symposium titled “When Everything Else Fails – The Role of the Arts in Conflict Resolutions – Cultural cooperation between Palestine, Israel and Lebanon.” Referring to his experience of organizing a festival in Lebanon, he spoke about people experiencing moral support in arts festivals even amid the destruction in conflict areas. One of his last projects as director of the institute in Abu Dhabi was an art exhibition called Love | Labour | Leisure, reflecting the lives of migrant workers in the United Arab Emirates.
