= Farid Hourani =

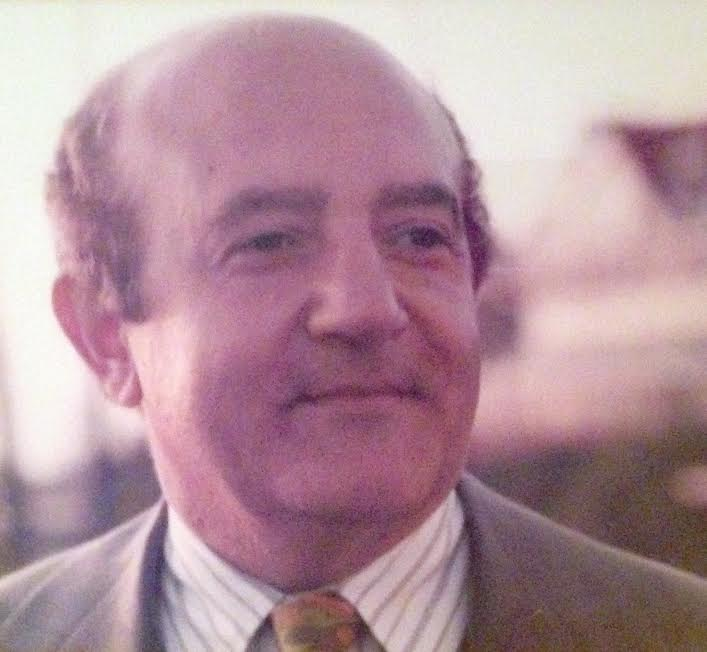
- Farid I. Hourani in Coronado, California

Farid I. Hourani (also spelled Farid I. Haurani) was a Lebanese-American physician and author of Olinda's Dream.

Dr. Hourani was born in 1928 in Gaza, Palestine to Iskander Hourani, MD and Olinda Negeim. His father was born in Judaidet Merjayoun, Lebanon, educated at Syrian Protestant College, now, known as American University of Beirut, Lebanon. After First World War, Dr. Iskander Hourani, serving with the Ottomans in Palestine and imprisoned by the British, he became physician and public health officer with the British Mandate Government of Palestine (1918–1948). His mother was born, raised and educated in Jerusalem. She worked for the British government as secretary (1918–20). Both parents got married in 1920 and started their married life in Gaza.

Dr. Hourani took his early education at the American Ramallah Friends Schools, Palestine and his BA and MD degrees at the American University of Beirut. Immediately after graduation, Dr. Hourani came to the United States in 1953. After three year of medical residency, he took two years of Fellowship in Hematology at the Cardeza Foundation for Hematologic Research of Jefferson Medical College, now, of Thomas Jefferson University, Philadelphia, PA USA, under the tutelage of the late Leandro Tocantins MD, who became Dr. Hourani's professor and mentor. Dr. Haurani took an early retirement in 1988 to work at the Pasteur Institute in Paris on iron and later at the Royal Free Hospital in London on vitamin B12. He lived in South Carolina at the time of his death, 11 November 2014.
