= Evgeny Golubev =

Russian composer (1910–1988)

Yevgeny Kirillovich Golubev (Russian: Евге́ний Кири́ллович Го́лубев; 16 February 1910 – 25 December 1988) was a Soviet and Russian composer.

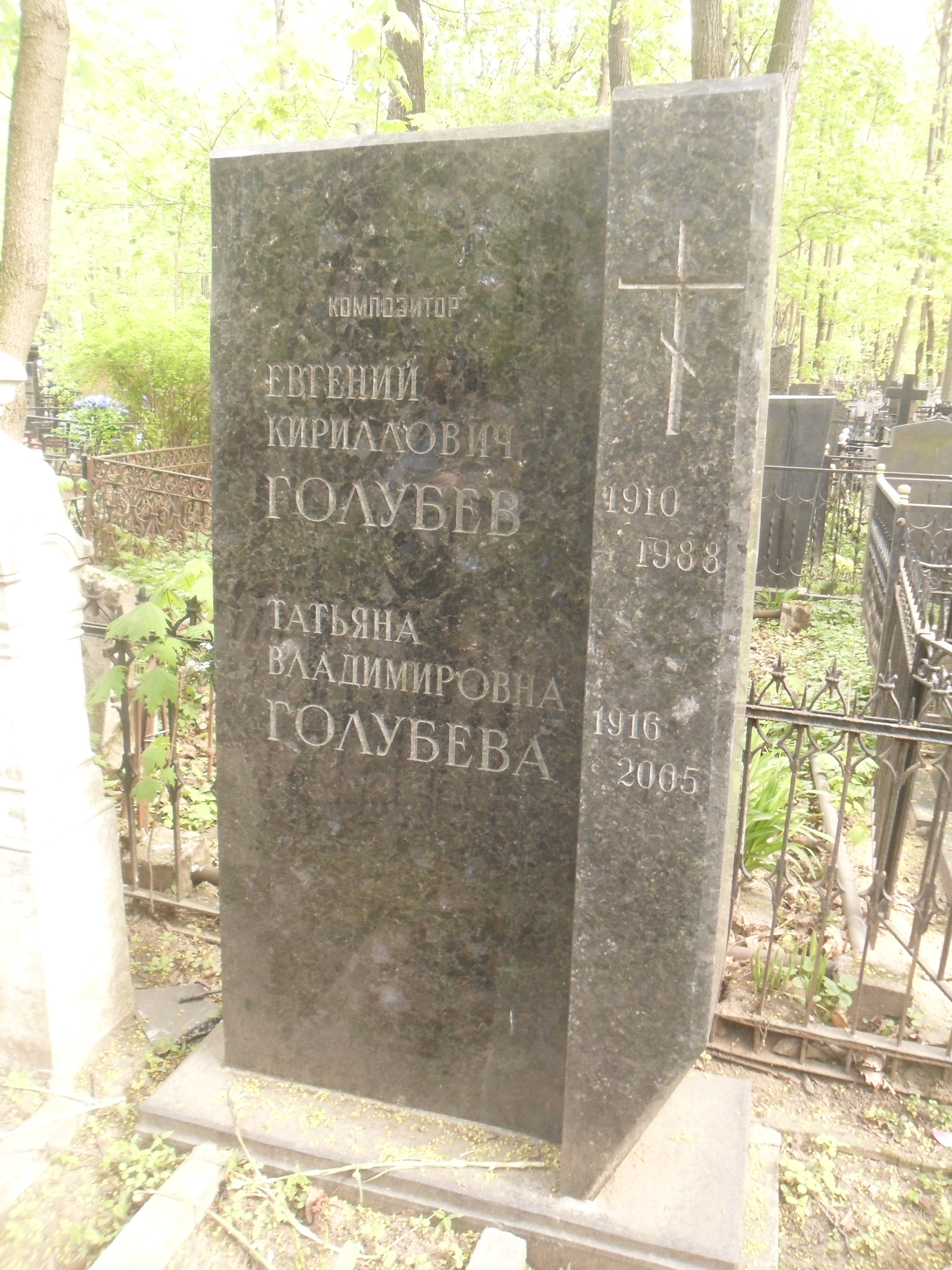

Golubev was born and died in Moscow. He was taught by Nikolai Myaskovsky, and his students included Iosif Andriasov from 1958 till 1963, Alfred Schnittke, who studied with him from 1953 until 1958, Asya Sultanova, and Misha Geller. His own compositions included at least twenty-four string quartets, seven symphonies, three piano concertos - the last dedicated to and recorded by Tatiana Nikolayeva -, concertos for violin, cello and viola, ten piano sonatas (the sixth dedicated to Myaskovsky), sonatas for violin, cello and for trumpet (1956) (the latter dedicated to Sergei Nikolaevich Yeryomin), and quintets for strings with piano and with harp, among other works. This harp quintet is one of Golubev's few works that are still occasionally performed.

The Soviet state record label Melodiya released several LPs of his music, including the three piano concertos, two of the symphonies, and some chamber works and songs which are no longer easily available. During the last years, some of these old recordings were released on CD. Melodiya has in 2005 reissued Nikolayeva's recordings of the 3rd piano concerto and 4th piano sonata (1942–1943).

== Selected works ==
=== Symphonic ===
- Symphony no. 1 op. 11 (1933, rev. 1950)
- Symphony no. 2 op. 17 (1938, rev. 1973)
- Symphony no. 3 op. 21bis (1942, rev. 1974)
- Symphony no. 4 op. 28 (1947)
- Symphony no. 5 in A minor op. 45 (1960)
- Symphony no. 6 op. 51 (1966)
- Symphony no. 7 in B minor op. 67, ‘Heroic’ (1972)
- Ukrainian Rhapsody in G minor, op. 81 (1982)

=== Concertante ===
- Piano concerto no. 1 in A minor op. 24 (1944)
- Piano concerto no. 2 in D flat op. 30 (1948)
- Piano concerto no. 3 in G minor op. 40 (1954)
- Cello concerto in D minor, op. 41 (1956)
- Violin concerto in D minor op. 56 (1970)
- Viola concerto op. 57 (1962)

=== Stage works ===
- Ballet – Одиссей (The Oddysey) (1965)
- Oratorio – Возвращение солнца (Return of the Sun) op.12, Sami folk tale (1936, rev. 1980)
- Oratorio – Герои бессмертны (Immortal Heroes) op. 25 (1946, Stefanovich/Gorodestky)

=== Chamber works ===
- 24 string quartets (1931-1986)
- Piano quintet op. 20 (1938)
- Quintet for harp and string quartet in C minor op. 39 (1953)
- Quartet for two flutes and two harps op. 49 (1963)
- Violin sonata op. 37 (1952)
- Cello sonata op. 60 (1972)
- Trumpet sonata in E flat op. 36/1 (1951)

=== Piano ===
- 10 sonatas (1930-1977)
- Ukrainian rhapsody op. 14 (1936)
- Triptych for piano or organ op. 85 (1985)
- 5 pieces in memory of M. Lermontov (1939)
- Children’s album (1945–46)
- Additional smaller pieces

=== Vocal ===
- Works for voice and piano
- Works for unaccompanied chorus
- Russian folk songs, etc.
