= Farid Isfarayini =

13th-century Persian poet

Farid Isfarayini (died after 1264) was a Persian poet of the 13th-century, who served at the court of the Salghurids in Shiraz.

== Sources ==
- Safa, Zabihollah (1999). "Farīd Esfarāyenī, Malek-al-Šoʿarāʾ Ḵᵛāja Farīd-al-Dīn Aḥwal". Encyclopaedia Iranica.
