= Farid Raymond-Anthony =

Farid Raymond Anthony
- Born: 1933; Freetown, Sierra Leone
- Died: 16 September 2015; Gillingham, Kent, UK
- Occupation: Sierra Leonean writer

Farid Raymond Anthony (born 1933 in Freetown, died 2015 in Gillingham) was a Sierra Leonean writer, author and poet. He was born in Freetown, Sierra Leone to parents of Lebanese descent. Farid Anthony has written several books, including Stories from Sierra Leone (ISBN 0948193905), and Sawpit Boy.

Farid Anthony was called to the English bar by Inner Temple in 1962, but he returned to practice at the Sierra Leone bar. He became a door tenant in the chambers of Sir Desmond de Silva QC, then at 2 Paper Buildings in the Temple, whom he met in the course of the 1969 treason trial of Samuel Hinga Norman in Sierra Leone.

Farid left Sierra Leone in 1991 with his English-born wife, Joan, and settled in England. He belated finished his pupillage to practice at the English bar, but instead of remaining at the bar he practised as an immigration consultant, publishing in 1996 a book "Questions and Answers on Immigration in Britain".
