= Farid Stino =

Egyptian scientist

Farid Kamal Ramzi Stino is an Egyptian scientist, scholar, and entrepreneur who was born in Cairo on September 1, 1943. He is the son of Kamal Ramzi Stino, Deputy Prime Minister of Egypt under Nasser's regime, and Lady Farida Shawky Shenouda, daughter of Shawkey BEK Shenouda. He earned his Bachelor of Science degree from Cairo University, Egypt, in 1964. He then travelled to the United States and earned his Master of Science degree in 1968 and his Ph.D. degree in 1971, from The University of Georgia, in Athens, Georgia. It was there that he met and married his wife Zandra Hargrove Stino. He has five children.

Stino was the President and CEO of Ismailia-Misr Poultry Company, one of the largest poultry companies in the Middle East. He is also the owner and founder of Stino Farms, based in Cairo.

He founded Stino Agriconsults, an agricultural consulting firm. Stino taught Poultry Breeding and Genetics at Cairo University. He also taught Biostatistics and Computer Methodology, as a visiting professor, at Florida Agriculture and Mechanical University (FAMU) in Tallahassee Florida for twelve years starting 1988. He returned to Cairo University in 2000 to head the Department of Animal Production, Faculty of Agriculture, Cairo University.
