= Farid Trad =

Farid Trad (1901-1969) was a Lebanese engineer, architect, and art collector. He designed buildings in Beirut, including the UNESCO headquarters, hotels and cinemas, as well as in Damascus, Syria. He collected artwork by Michel Basbous, Georges Cyr, Haroutiun Galentz and his wife Armine Kalents, Paul Guiragossian, Youssef Howayek, and Elie Kanaan.
