= Farid Khabibulin =

Uzbek footballer (born 1967)

Personal information
- Full name: Farid Khabibulin
- Date of birth: November 8, 1967 (age 58)
- Place of birth: Tashkent Region, Uzbek SSR, Soviet Union
- Height: 1.82 m (5 ft 11 1/2 in)
- Positions: Midfielder; forward

Youth career
- Sohibkor

Senior career*
Years	Team	Apps	(Gls)
1989-1991	Sohibkor	14	(1)
1991	Chirchiq	48	(23)
1992	Kosonsoy	16	(5)
1993-1995	Navbahor Namangan	77	(25)
1996-2001	Dustlik Tashkent Region	170	(76)
2002	Qizilqum Zarafshon	22	(8)
2003	Metallurg Bekabad	14	(5)
2003-2004	Andijon	14	(7)
2004	Sogdiana Jizzakh	13	(3)
2005-2006	Kimyogar Chirchiq	54	(24)
2006	Dinamo Samarqand	9	(1)
2007	Shaykhontohur	6	(5)
2007	Sho'rchi-Lochin	5	(1)

International career
1996-1997	Uzbekistan	2	(0)
- * Club domestic league appearances and goals as of 1 January 2008

Farid Khabibulin (born 8 November 1967) is an Uzbek former professional footballer who played as a midfielder and forward.

== Playing career ==
During the Soviet period, Khabibulin played two seasons in the competitions of masters, appearing in the lower leagues for Sohibkor (Khalkabad) and Chirchiq. In 1991 scored 23 goals for Chirchiq in the Soviet Second League B.

From 1992 he began playing in Uzbekistan championship. After the collapse of Soviet Union he spent the first season with Kosonsaychi. In 1993 he transferred to Navbahor Namangan and with the club won several bronze medals in the national championship as well as the Uzbekistan Cup and reached the cup final once.

In 1996 he moved to Dustlik Tashkent Region and played six seasons for the club, making 170 appearances and scoring 76 goals. With Dustlik he became a two-time national champion and Uzbekistan Cup winner. While playing for Navbahor and Dustlik he scored more than 10 goals in six different seasons. His best results came in the 1997 and 2000 seasons when he scored 17 goals.

In 2002 he played for Qizilqum Zarafshon, winning the bronze medals of the Uzbekistan championship.

Later he played in the top division for Metallurg Bekabad, Andijon, Sogdiana Jizzakh and Dinamo Samarqand. Toward the end of his career he also played in the First League for Kimyogar Chirchiq, Shaykhontohur and Sho'rchi-Lochin. Khabibulin retired from professional football at the age of 40.

In total he scored 130 goals in the Uzbekistan top division (according to some sources - 131).

Khabibulin made his debut for the Uzbekistan national football team on 11 September 1996 in a friendly match against the Japan national football team. In total he played two matches for the national team between 1996 and 1997, both as a substitute.

He also participates in veterans tournaments.

== Honours ==
- Uzbekistan Super League champion: 1999, 2000
- Uzbekistan championship bronze medalist: 1993, 1994, 1995, 2002
- Uzbekistan Cup winner: 1995, 2000
- Uzbekistan Cup finalist: 1993
- Member of Gennadiy Krasnitsky Club: 145 goals
