= Farid Dosayev =

Soviet swimmer (born 1933)

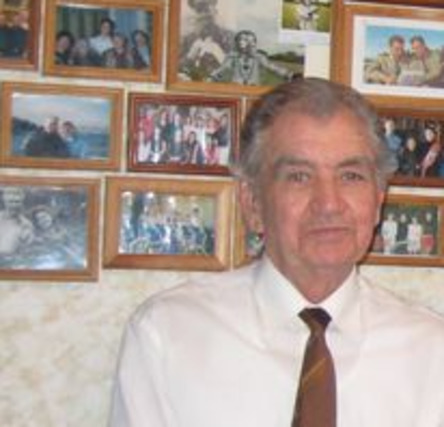

Personal information
- Born: 6 March 1933 Lwów, Poland

Sport
- Sport: Swimming

Farid Abdulovich Dosayev (Ukrainian: Фарід Абдулович Досаєв; Russian: Фарид Абдулович Досаев; born 6 March 1933) is a Soviet retired swimmer and sports commentator. He competed in the 200 m breaststroke at the 1956 Summer Olympics, but did not reach the final. He won a national title in the same event in 1956 and set a national record in the 100 m breaststroke in 1951.

Dosayev retired from senior competitions in 1959. Since 1958 he worked as a sports commentator on central TV and radio, first in Kiev, then in Moscow for 11 years, and then back in Kiev. He took part in the first Soviet master championships in 1989 and finished second in the 50 m breaststroke event, but then realized that he could not combine his work with competitions and stopped.

Dosayev is a graduate of Lviv State Institute of Physical Culture (now Lviv State University of Physical Culture).
