= Abdul Salam (jurist) =

1990s Taliban judge

Abdul Salam عبدالسلام
- Occupation: Judge

Abdul Salam was a Judge of the Supreme Court of the Islamic Emirate of Afghanistan during the 1990s regime of the Taliban.
