= Farid Hazem =

French footballer (born 1986)

Personal information
- Date of birth: 19 June 1986 (age 40)
- Place of birth: Montreuil, France
- Height: 1.78 m (5 ft 10 in)
- Position: Midfielder

Senior career*
Years	Team	Apps	(Gls)
2003–2004	Paris Saint-Germain B		
2004–2006	Guingamp B		
2005–2006	Guingamp	1	(0)
2006–2007	SO Châtellerault	35	(2)
2007–2008	FC Martigues	14	(0)
2008–2009	Pau FC	33	(7)
2009–2010	Red Star	6	(0)
2010–2012	Pau FC	26	(3)
- * Club domestic league appearances and goals

Farid Hazem is a French former professional footballer who played as a midfielder. He played on the professional level in Ligue 2 for En Avant de Guingamp, then in Championnat National from 2006 to 2008. In 2009, he was with Red Star FC, but had limited appearances due to a knee injury. As of 2016, he was playing for JS Saint-Pierroise in Réunion.
