= Farid Dieck =

Mexican writer, speaker, psychologist and internet personality (born 1993)

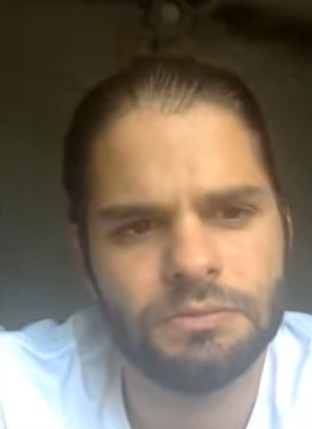
- Dieck in 2021
- Born: Farid Dieck Kattás; April 26, 1993 (age 33); Monterrey, Nuevo León, Mexico
- Education: Monterrey Institute of Technology and Higher Education; National Autonomous University of Mexico
- Occupations: Writer, musician, influencer, psychologist and speaker
- Years active: 2017-present
- Notable work: Relatos y Reflexiones (podcast); Axel & Astro (web series)
- Website: faridieck.com

Farid Dieck Kattás (born April 26, 1993), known simply as Farid Dieck, is a Mexican writer, speaker, musician, internet personality, and psychologist.

== Early life ==
Farid Dieck was born in Monterrey, on April 26, 1993, the youngest of five brothers (one of whom died in a car accident). He is of Palestinian and Lebanese descent, as his grandparents had emigrated to Mexico from those countries in search of a better future.

Dieck began his studies in Music Production Engineering at the Monterrey Institute of Technology. He later expanded his training in areas such as psychology, moral philosophy, and happiness sciences, earning diplomas at universities such as Yale and Berkeley. He is currently pursuing a Bachelor's degree in Psychology from the National Autonomous University of Mexico (UNAM) and a Master's degree in Mental Health with a psychoanalytic focus from the University of León, Spain.

== Career ==
In 2015, Dieck co-founded Ecü, a vegan footwear brand made from recycled tire soles. This venture allowed his to begin sharing his vision of sustainability and social entrepreneurship. In an interview, she mentioned that the idea arose as "a way to channel his pain and give a positive purpose to his lived experience." Starting in January 2017, he began creating audiovisual content on social media, addressing topics such as philosophy, psychology, and personal development.

Dieck has been a speaker in more than fifteen countries in the Americas and Europe, where he has shared his message at various academic, cultural, and personal development events. During the months of September and October 2017, he gave lectures at the Autonomous University of Tamaulipas (UAT) in Ciudad Madero. In 2018, he participated in a conference in Guatemala entitled Las cosas no pasan por algo, pasan para algo ("Things don't happen for a reason, they happen for a reason"), which brought together more than six hundred attendees and aimed to raise funds for the Guatemalan Foundation for Children with Deafblindness Alex (FUNDAL). That same year, he held other conferences of the same name, such as one in Tlajomulco, one titled "Fear for Dreams" in the Dominican Republic, among others. In 2019, he gave a lecture at the Tecnológico de Monterrey, where he had previously studied.

During that time, Dieck opted for podcasts, creating his own podcast called Relatos y Reflexiones ("Stories and Reflections") in addition to venturing into TikTok.

In 2023, he participated in the Culiacán International Book Fair, where he presented his talk Construyendo un Sentido ("Building a Meaning"), addressing topics such as death, love, identity and existential purpose. That same year, he also participated in the Innovation and Creativity Festival held in León, Guanajuato. In 2025, he presented his talk Construyendo un Sentido ("Building a Meaning") again at the Gymnasium of the Colegio de Bachilleres (Cobach) in Ciudad Juárez.

In November 2024, he announced the premiere of a web series called Axel y Astro, focusing on the lives of two robots trying to understand the human world and its psychological aspects.

== Personal life ==
In 2022, Dieck met influencer and speaker Jessica Fernández during a social entrepreneurship conference where they participated as speakers, which led to a professional collaboration. Over time, the two began dating, and in mid-2025, the couple announced their decision to get married.

== Discography ==
=== Singles ===
- Las Cosas Pasan para Algo (2018)
- La Oportunidad (2019)
- Bella (ft. José Ignacio Martínez) (2020)
- A Expectativas (2021)
- Futuralgia (2021)

== Awards and nominations ==
Year	Award	Category	Result	Ref.
2024	TikTok Awards	Me Hizo Ver	Won	
2025	Spotify Podcast Awards	Welfare	Won	
2025	Eliot Awards	Storyteller	Won	
