= Farid Agamoglanov =

Azerbaijani kickboxer

Personal information
- Nationality: Azerbaijan
- Citizenship: Azerbaijani
- Born: 27 July 1994 (age 31) Baku
- Height: 1.76
- Weight: 63,5

Sport
- Sport: boxer, kickboxer
- Weight class: 63

Farid Agamoglanov - Azerbaijani boxer and kickboxer, competing in the weight category up to 63.5 kg full contact, winner of the III European Games and V Islamic Solidarity Games, bronze medalist of the 2022 European Championship. Sergeant of Justice.

== Biography ==
Farid Azakh ogly Agamoglanov was born on July 27, 1994, In September 2010, in Belgrade, he became the bronze medalist of the World Junior Championships in the weight category up to 51 kg (full contact). In April 2019, representing the Gabala club, he became the bronze medalist of the Great Silk Road International boxing tournament in Baku In the fall of 2020, he took part in the Second Karabakh War, was awarded medals three times, including the medal "For the Liberation of Jabrayil" and the medal "For the Liberation of Khojavend". In August 2022, he won the gold medal of the V Islamic Solidarity Games in Konya, Turkey. In November of the same year, he won bronze at the European Championship in Antalya, thereby winning a license for the III European Games. In June 2023, he took part in the III European Games in Krakow, where he defeated an athlete from Slovakia Filip Barak in the quarterfinals of the weight category up to 63.5 kg, reaching the semifinals. Here he defeated the Norwegian representative of the world champion Americo Barrios, and in the final — the Italian world champion of 2021 Damiano Tramontana, becoming the winner of the European Games.
