= Farid Mansour (businessman) =

Egyptian businessman

Farid Sabry Mansour (Arabic: فريد منصور) (14 August 1933 – 16 September 2012) was an Egyptian businessman who led the merger of Coopers & Lybrand and Price Waterhouse alongside Afifi Alshahawi PricewaterhouseCoopers in Egypt. The first office PwC was founded in 1907 in Egypt under the name Pricewaterhouse, which later in 1980 merged with Coopers & Lybrand. Born to an Austrian Mother and an Egyptian father. He was also a Rotarian, and Chairman of the Quseir Heritage Preservation Society. President of the Islamic and Coptic Museum Friendship Associations in Egypt, heading the renovation and restoration. He had 4 sons Tarek (Eldest), Sherif, Hani and Ahmed (Youngest). Also he had 13 grandchildren which Karim is the oldest and Ali was the youngest.
