= Abdessalem Arous =

Tunisian judoka (born 1979)

Abdessalem Arous (born 14 January 1979) is a Tunisian judo securing third place in the African Judo championships(2001) and 2nd place in the African Judo Championships(2000) ka.

== Achievements ==
Year	Tournament	Place	Weight class
2001	African Judo Championships	3rd	Half middleweight (81 kg)
2000	African Judo Championships	2nd	Half middleweight (81 kg)
