= Fazlur Rahman Faridi =

Indian Islamic studies scholar, economist and writer

Dr. Fazlur Rahman Faridi
- Born: 4 April 1932 (age 94); Uttar Pradesh, India
- Died: 25 July 2011; Aligarh

Education
- Education: Allahabad University; Aligarh Muslim University

Fazlur Rahman Faridi (2 April 1932, Jaunpur, Uttar Pradesh, India – 25 July 2011, Aligarh, India) was an Islamic studies scholar, economist and a writer on Islam and contemporary issues. He was the director of research and studies of Jamaat-e-Islami Hind.

== Biography ==
Faridi completed his schooling in Jaunpur. He then went on to pursue his graduation and post graduation from Allahabad University and received a PhD in Economics from Aligarh Muslim University (AMU). He studied Arabic and Islamiat at Thanvi Darsgah, Rampur. He retired as a Professor in Economics after serving at AMU and King Abdul Aziz University.

He was the editor of Urdu monthly Zindagi-e-Nau and English magazine Radiance Viewsweekly and served as a board member of various Trusts. He was a member of Central Advisory Council of Jamaat-e-Islami Hind besides being a member of Zonal Advisory Council of Jamaat-e-Islami Hind, Uttar Pradesh.

He has about two dozen books, in English and Urdu, to his credit.

Faridi was a descendant of Sufi preacher Khwaja Farīduddīn Mas'ūd Ganjshakar.

== See also ==
- Jamaat-e-Islami Hind
- Maulana Maududi
- Mohammad Najatuallah Siddiqi
