= Abdulsalam Abdullah =

Iraqi politician (born 1965)

Dr. Abdulsalam Abdullah

Provincial Council Chairman of Anbar

Personal details
- Born: 1965 (age 60–61)

Abdulsalam Abdullah Mohammad Al-Ani (born 1965) is the current Provincial Council Chairman (PCC) of Al Anbar Province, Iraq. In December 2007, Dr. Abdullah presided over a joint meeting of the Anbar Provincial Council (PC) and the Council of Tribal Sheikhs as part of an outreach effort to the province's tribal leaders. It was the first PC meeting in Ramadi since November 2007, when the Iraq Awakening Council, Sahawa al-Iraq (SAI) had called for Abdulsalam's replacement as its chairman and suspended its activities. SAI leaders were invited, but did not attend.
