= Sayyar Jamil =

Iraqi scholar (1952)

- سيار الجميل
- Born: 1952 (age 73–74); Iraq
- Education: University of St Andrews
- Scientific career
- Workplaces: Arab Center for Research and Policy Studies
- Website: www.sayyaraljamil.com/English

Sayyar al Jamil (Arabic: سيار الجميل) is a Research Professor at the Arab Center for Research and Policy Studies in Doha, Qatar. Jamil was born in Iraq in 1952, and lived in Mosul before receiving his PhD at the University of St Andrews in Scotland.

== Writings on generational throughout Arab history ==
Jamil's website states a number of works which he has published in Arabic, but he is mostly widely known for his work on his contribution of a new theory (known in Arabic as Arabic: المجايلة or "successive generational shifts") of historical development, in which successive generations shape the course of events over roughly periodic cycles of 30 years or (the estimated duration of a single generation).
