= Mikael Davud =

Al-Qaeda operative (born 1971)

- Born: Muhammed Rashidin; 24 April 1971 (age 54); Xinjiang, China
- Citizenship: Norwegian

Mikael Davud (born 24 April 1971) is a Chinese-Norwegian Al-Qaeda operative convicted for conspiracy to commit terror against the Danish newspaper Jyllands-Posten, along with co-conspirator Shawan Bujak. Arrested in 2010, Davud was sentenced to eight years imprisonment in 2013.

== Early life ==
Born Muhammed Rashidin, an ethnic Uyghur from the Xinjiang province in China, Davud came to Norway in 1999 as a refugee and was granted Norwegian citizenship in 2007. He changed his name to Mikael Davud the same year, in 2007. He has been described as deeply religious and to have refused to learn the Norwegian language for perceived religious purposes. In the 1990s he studied at a Quran school with alleged ties to the Taliban in Karachi, Pakistan. His activities in Pakistan and China's subsequent demand for extradition caused Davud to flee to Norway as a refugee in 1999.

== Arrest and conviction ==
As part of the investigation of a suspected terror plot revealed in 2010, Davud was reportedly subjected to the "full arsenal of surveillance" of the Norwegian Police Security Service (PST). After cooperation with US and British intelligence, Davud was thought to be the leader of a Norwegian Al-Qaeda cell, with connections to the terror network responsible for the 2009 New York City Subway and United Kingdom plot. Evidence included series of emails, and having received bomb-making training abroad. He is suspected of having had direct contacts with the commander of the Turkistan Islamic Party (TIP), and Al-Qaeda tops like Saleh al-Somali thought to have ordered the attacks.

Davud is alleged to have spent five months at an Al-Qaeda training camp in the Waziristan region in Pakistan from 2008 to 2009, although he himself claims to have received training in Iran and in Turkey as part of a solo terror plot to bomb the Chinese embassy in Oslo. Considered the ringleader, he was convicted to seven years in prison by the Oslo District Court for conspiracy to commit terror by plotting to bomb the Danish newspaper Jyllands-Posten and/or shoot cartoonist Kurt Westergaard. His solo terrorist claims, which would have avoided the stricter anti-terror law sentencing associated with conspiring with at least one other person, was dismissed by the court. His accomplice Shawan Bujak was sentenced to three and a half years, while the third suspect David Jakobsen was acquitted for terror charges due to having contacted and assisted PST. The verdicts were upheld following appeals to the Borgarting Court of Appeal and finally the Supreme Court of Norway, while Davud's sentence was raised to eight years.

In 2016 Davud sued the Norwegian state, demanding to be released on probation as he had served two thirds of his sentence, claiming good behaviour.
