= 2010 Norway terror plot =

Terrorist plot in Norway

The 2010 Norway terror plot was a Norway-based plan to bomb the Danish newspaper Jyllands-Posten and to kill the cartoonist Kurt Westergaard. Two men with links to Al-Qaeda were convicted of the plot, while a third person was acquitted of terror charges.

== Background ==
After investigations by Norwegian intelligence in cooperation with US and British intelligence, three Norwegian residents were arrested on 8 July 2010 in what was described as part of the largest terrorist network uncovered since the September 11 attacks. The men were thought to be part of an Al-Qaeda cell in Norway with links to the network responsible for the 2009 New York City Subway and United Kingdom plot, and were charged with conspiracy to commit one or more acts of terrorism in Norway. The plots were thought to have been ordered by Saleh al-Somali, and to have had links to Adnan Gulshair el Shukrijumah. At least two of the suspects had regularly attended the Muslim Cultural Center in Sarpsborg, a radical mosque known for its militant views.

== Suspects ==
- Mikael Davud (born Mohammad Rashidin), 39, a Uyghur from China, came to Norway as a refugee in 1999 and became a Norwegian citizen in 2007.
- Shawan Sadek Saeed Bujak, 37, a Kurd from Iraq, came to Norway in 1999 and was granted residence on humanitarian grounds.
- David Jakobsen (born Alisjer Abdulaif), 31, an Uzbek, came to Norway as an asylum seeker in 2002, had his application rejected but gained permanent residence based on family reunification.

== Investigation and trial ==
According to the Norwegian Police Security Service (PST), the men were thought to have planned to make bombs based on hydrogen peroxide. Jakobsen had contacted PST months prior to the arrest and had functioned as their informant. Due to being under extensive surveillance, Norwegian police were able to replace the dangerous chemicals thought to be acquired by the cell with harmless ones.

In September, Bujak confessed to having planned to bomb the Danish newspaper Jyllands-Posten and to shoot the cartoonist Kurt Westergaard together with Davud. In a statement to the Associated Press, Brynjar Meling, Bujak's defense attorney, confirmed that his client acknowledged his involvement in the plot: "He says it's vital that he, like a true Muslim, tells the truth", Meling said. "It is important that the case will no longer be more serious than it was before and will not cause more harm to Muslims than it has already done." All three men had changed their names in the aftermath of the Jyllands-Posten Muhammad cartoons controversy. Some days later, the suspected main perpetrator Mikael Davud claimed that he had planned to bomb the Chinese embassy and other Chinese interests in Oslo and other parts of Norway as part of a personal vendetta because of the treatment of ethnic Uyghurs in China, unknown by the other suspects. A solo plot would have avoided the stricter sentencing under Norway's anti-terror laws which required a person to have entered into a conspiracy with at least one other person.

On 30 January 2012 the Oslo District Court convicted Davud and Bujak for conspiracy to commit terror against Jyllands-Posten in Copenhagen or Århus, while dismissing Davud's claims of plans to bomb the Chinese embassy. Davud was sentenced to seven years in prison, Bajuk to three and a half years, while Jakobsen was acquitted of the terror charges. All three were convicted of having produced explosives.

The verdicts were upheld on appeals to the Borgarting Court of Appeal and the Supreme Court of Norway, with Davud's sentence being increased to eight years.

== See also ==
- 2011 Norway attacks
- 2010 Copenhagen terror plot
