= Hazrati Abu Bakr Siddique Mosque =

Flushing, Queens, New York, United States

Coordinates: 40°46′6.08″N 73°49′30.28″W

Masjid Hazrat Abu Bakr Siddique
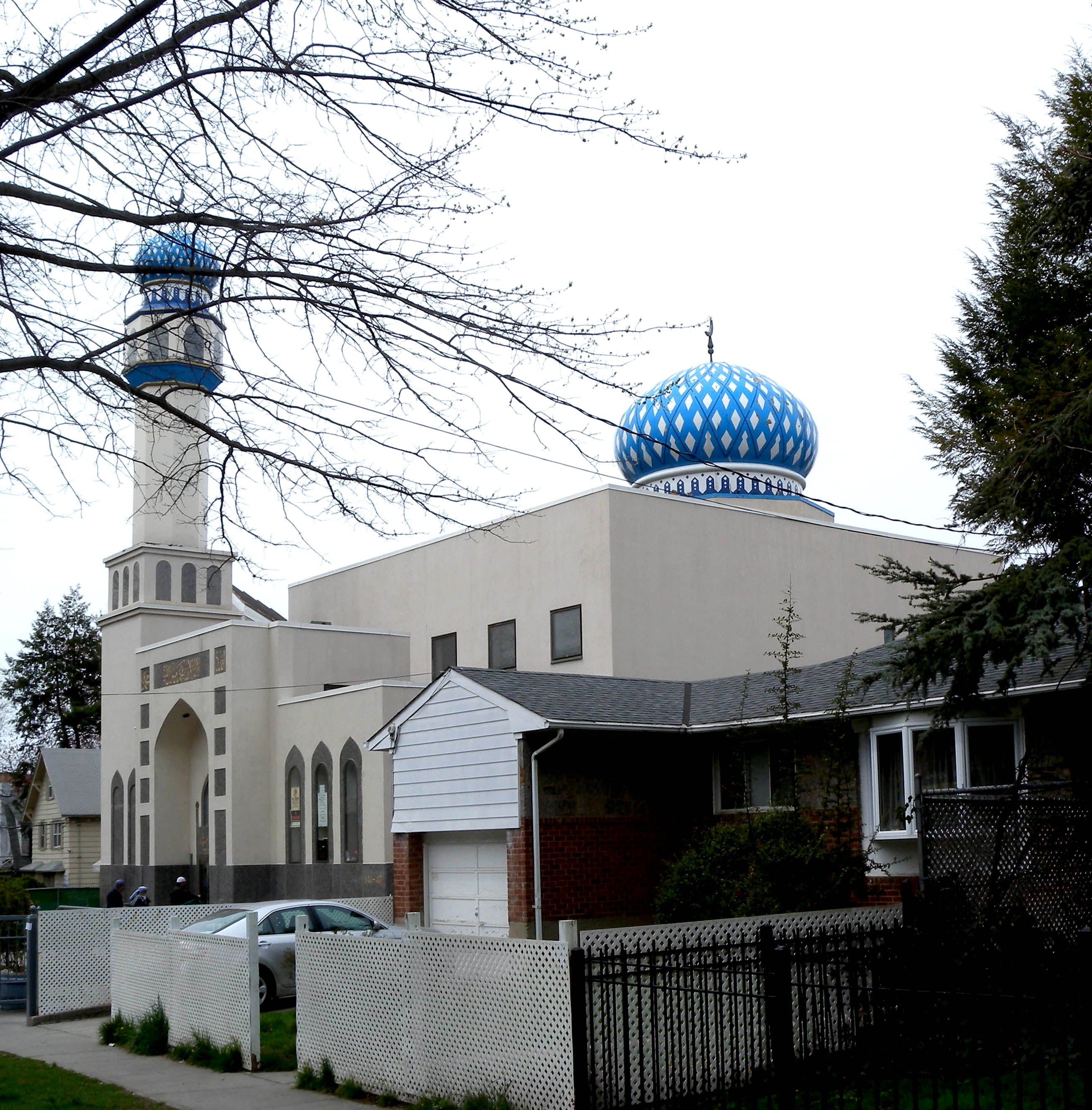

Religion
- Affiliation: Islam

Location
- Location: Flushing, Queens, NY
- Interactive map of Masjid Hazrat Abu Bakr Siddique

Website
- masjid-abubakr.org

Masjid Hazrat Abu Bakr Siddique (Arabic: مسجد حضرة أبو بكر الصديق) Is a Mosque in Flushing, Queens, New York, United States. It is located at 141-47 33rd Avenue.

Masjid Hazrat Abu Bakr Siddique is a nonprofit 501(c) organization, a community of believers adhering to Islam, The Quran and the life traditions of Muhammad. Masjid Hazrat Abu Bakr Siddique was established by Pakistani, Afghan, and Uzbek immigrants in 1986 as a community center for religious events and helpful programs. The Mosque, Al-Masjid in Arabic, is the Muslim gathering place for prayer. Al-Masjid simply means “Place of prostration.”

The mosque came to national attention when it was revealed that it had been regularly attended by Najibullah Zazi, Mohammed Wali Zazi, and Ahmad Wais Afzali. The three were directly linked to Al-Qaeda and were charged with issues related to Terrorism.

== See also ==
- List of mosques in the Americas
- Lists of mosques
- List of mosques in the United States
