= Saifur Rahman Halimi =

- سيف الرحمن حليمي
- Born: Afghanistan
- Known for: Chief representative of Gulbuddin Hekmatyar in the USA

Saifur Rahman Halimi (Pashto: سيف الرحمن حليمي) was born in Afghanistan, and became a legal resident of the United States. Following the arrest of bombing suspect Najibullah Zazi, and his father Mohammed Wali Zazi, the Associated Press characterized Saifur Rahman Halimi as Gulbuddin Hekmatyar's "chief representative".

In 1996, Halimi was an expert witness in a sexual abuse case. Mohammad Kargar, a man from Afghanistan who was living in Maine was tried for kissing his 18-month-old son's penis. Halimi testified about the cultural background of Kargar's act when he appealed his conviction. Kargar's conviction was overturned.

Newsday reported on October 14, 2001, five weeks after Al Qaeda's attacks on September 11, 2001, Halimi was a leader of one faction who were disputing control over New York City's largest mosque.

Najibullah Zazi was a 24-year-old Afghan who had triggered suspicion that he had planned to explode a bomb or bombs in New York City on the eighth anniversary of Al Qaeda's attacks on September 11, 2001. On October 4, 2009, the Associated Press offered a further trigger for suspicion—when Najibullah Zazi was a teenager in Queens, New York, his family lived in the same family as Saifur Rahman Halimi, and had attended the same mosque.
