= Andrew Mearns =

Scottish minister (1837–1905)

Andrew Mearns (1837–1905) was a Scottish Congregational minister, now best known as the prime mover behind the sensational anonymous 1883 pamphlet The Bitter Cry of Outcast London. While scholarly debate has concluded that the author was the journalist William Carnall Preston, it has always been clear that the basis for the pamphlet's claims about poverty in London rested on research commissioned by Mearns.

== Early life ==
He was born at Burnside, New Cumnock in Ayrshire, to John Mearns (1810–1882), born in Ochiltree and employed at the St Rollox Chemical Works, and his wife Agnes Hyslop. The Rev. Peter Mearns of Coldstream was his uncle. His grandfather James Mearns, a farmer, was an elder of the United Secession Church at Muirkirk.

Mearns was educated at the normal school in Glasgow, then at Glasgow University. He was a pupil teacher at the normal school, and went on to be an assistant master at the Royal Grammar School, Newcastle under James Snape.

== Pastor ==
From 1860 Mearns trained for the ministry at the Theological Hall of the United Presbyterian Church in Edinburgh. In 1863 he took a co-pastor post in the Great Marlow Congregational church. In 1865 he married. He became in 1866 the pastor at the Congregational chapel in Markham Square which had been founded c.1859 (demolished 1953).

== London Congregational Union ==
The London Congregational Union (LCU) began in a small way in 1873. In 1894 it claimed 250 affiliated churches. Its headquarters was the Congregational Memorial Hall.

Mearns became its secretary in 1876, and in 1879 the post was made full-time, Mearns giving up his role at Markham Square. He has been called "a forceful character, sometimes quite ruthless in his business dealings", if committed to developing Congregationalism. Charles Leach in building up the Queen's Park Congregational Church found the LCU financial handling and administration by Mearns less than ideal.

In 1887, speaking in Adelaide, the congregationalist Albert Spicer described an all-night walk he and his wife Jessie had taken with Mearns eastwards in London, starting from the West End. In 1892 Mearns, allied with the chairman Edward Spicer and the treasurer, threatened not to stand again, in reaction to constitutional changes making the Union's Council fully elected, without co-option. Edward Spicer (1839–1912) was chairman of Spicer Brothers, while Albert Spicer was a partner in James Spicer & Sons, two paper companies run by cousins that merged in 1922.

=== The Bitter Cry of Outcast London ===
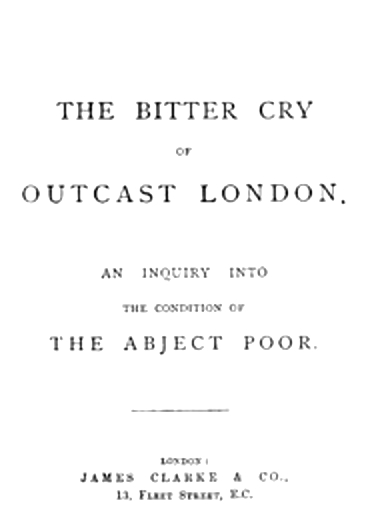
The Bitter Cry of Outcast London, title page

Albert Spicer and Mearns were credited in 1888 for the LCU initiative in publishing the 1883 pamphlet The Bitter Cry of Outcast London. The writer was, by current consensus, William Carnall Preston (1837–1902); James Munro was involved in the field work and research, with Mearns. (Munro, who had been pastor at the Congregational church in Limerick, had before that been at Muirkirk, Ayrshire, at the Evangelical Union Church.) Ben Tillett, who disliked the pamphlet's sensationalism, gave attribution to Arnold White. The pamphlet itself acknowledges research assistance from Archibald G. Brown at the East London Tabernacle (now a Baptist church) and the London City Mission. Its substance covered overcrowding, "slum narrative" and criticism of current church attitudes.

Darley in her biography of Octavia Hill comments that The Bitter Cry of Outcast London "was merely the most sensational publication in what had become a debate in print." The year 1883 saw also the publication of the books How the Poor Live by George Robert Sims, illustrated by Fred Barnard, based on articles first appearing in the Pictorial World. Mearns permitted Sims to write that the articles had assisted the pamphlet. Gertrude Himmelfarb writes "It is not clear why Sims's articles, which were provocative enough at the time, were overshadowed four months later by The Bitter Cry of Outcast London." She states that the author had in common with Sims a wish for state intervention and "the right to live as something better than the uncleanest of brute beasts."

== Later life ==
In 1906 Mearns retired from his position as London Congregational Union secretary. He left London, moving to Burnham-on-Sea.

== Works ==
- London and its Teeming Toilers (1885)

== Family ==
Mearns married in 1865 Ann Knapp (Annie, Anne), daughter of William Knapp of Maidenhead; his uncle Peter Mearns officiated. She died in 1908 at age 62. She was occupied with voluntary work in the distribution of clothes to the destitute. This project from 1883 operated from 277 Coldharbour Lane, Brixton. Also in 1883, she set up a convalescent home as a charity, at East Cliff, Folkestone.
