= Death of Mark Saunders =

2008 shooting death in London

Mark Saunders
- Family photograph of Saunders
- Born: 1975 or 1976; Alderley Edge, Cheshire, England
- Died: 6 May 2008 (aged 32); Markham Square, Chelsea, London
- Cause of death: Gunshot
- Occupation: Barrister

Mark Saunders was a British barrister who was shot dead by police on 6 May 2008 after a five-hour siege at his home in Markham Square in Chelsea, London. Saunders was a successful divorce lawyer who struggled with depression and alcoholism. He had been behaving erratically and drinking heavily in the hours before the incident. Neighbours called the police after Saunders repeatedly fired a shotgun from a window shortly before 17:00 (BST, UTC+1). When armed police officers arrived, Saunders fired at their vehicle and the siege began. More armed officers arrived and took up positions in surrounding buildings and on the street. Saunders fired on two more occasions and the police returned fire, slightly wounding him. Around 20 minutes after the previous round of shooting, just after 21:30, Saunders waved the shotgun out of a window. As he lowered it in the direction of a group of police officers, seven officers fired eleven shots, of which at least five struck him. Police entered his flat minutes later and Saunders was taken to a waiting ambulance where he was pronounced dead.

The Independent Police Complaints Commission investigated the shooting as a matter of course. During the investigation, the Saunders family applied for judicial review of the investigation, claiming that the practice of conferring between the police officers involved made it inadequate; the practice was found lawful and the case dismissed, though it prompted a review of the practice. An inquest held in September 2010 heard that Saunders repeatedly asked during the siege to speak with his wife and a friend (both of whom were at the scene) but that the police refused the requests. It also learnt that Saunders' shotgun was in the open position and not capable of being fired when the police recovered it. The police officers who fired testified that they acted out of fear for their lives and the lives of their colleagues, and felt that they had no choice. The jury returned a verdict of lawful killing, but found several flaws in the police handling of the incident, including the lack of consideration to allowing him to speak to his wife, confusion in the chain of command, and a failure to take account of Saunders' drunken state. The jury did not consider that any of these factors significantly contributed to the outcome of the incident. They could not decide whether Saunders had intentionally aimed his weapon to provoke a lethal response from the police ("suicide by cop").

Some journalists criticised the shooting, contrasting it with incidents where the police waited longer before resorting to force. Retired police officers and academics responded that the police had previously been criticised for not acting quickly enough, and observed that the police faced a "damned if you do, damned if you don't" dilemma. The shooting was one of two by the Metropolitan Police in 2008; in the other, deemed to be a "suicide by cop", a man pointed a replica firearm at police officers. In the same year, the inquest into the death of Jean Charles de Menezes—shot by police in a case of mistaken identity in 2005—was ending, resulting in renewed public interest in police shootings. In 2010, the Metropolitan Police created a unit of senior officers to manage similar incidents.

== Background ==
Mark Saunders (born 1975/1976) was a 32-year-old barrister specialising in family law, particularly divorce proceedings, and was well-regarded within the field. He was raised in Alderley Edge, Cheshire, and educated at the private King's School in nearby Macclesfield. He earned a law degree from Christ Church, Oxford, in 1998 then undertook his pupillage at QEB chambers, a leading London set. He was called to the bar the following year, and joined QEB as a barrister. He worked on several high-profile and complex cases as well as writing and lecturing on his area of expertise. Almost a decade into his career, he was widely regarded as a future Queen's Counsel and potential judge.

Saunders lived with his wife in a rented flat in Markham Square, a quiet, upmarket street in Chelsea, West London. He spent three years as a reservist in the Territorial Army. He had long suffered with alcoholism and largely refrained from drinking but had had several relapses, at least one of which had resulted in his requiring hospital treatment for injuries sustained while drunk. He was also being treated for depression, for which he had been prescribed Prozac and attended therapy. On one occasion he received a police caution for being drunk and disorderly and on another neighbours found him sitting outside his flat in a distressed state; in May 2008 he had been teetotal for three months.

On the day of his death, Saunders left work early, before his wife—a barrister at the same chambers. He arrived home in a taxi at around 16:30, telling the taxi driver, "I'm going to die". Saunders began drinking large quantities of red wine and sent a text message to a friend which read "this is the end, my only friend, the end"—a quote from the song "The End" by The Doors used in the soundtrack to the film Apocalypse Now. The friend travelled to Saunders' house, as did Mrs Saunders, but the police had already arrived and cordoned off the street by the time they reached the area.

== Shooting ==
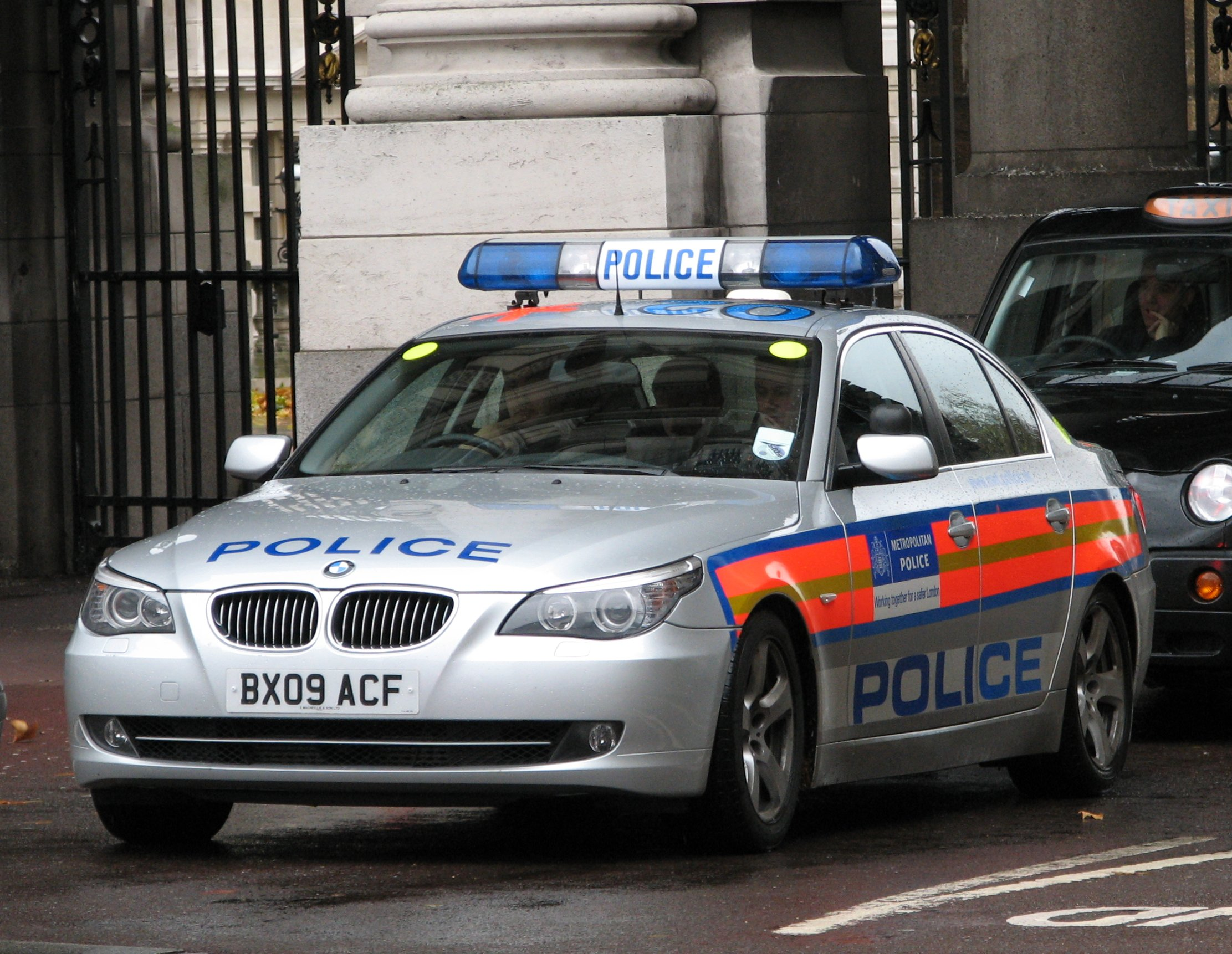
A Metropolitan Police armed response vehicle, similar to the type used at the incident

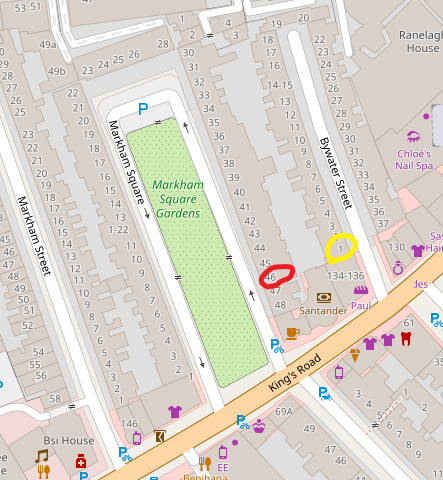
Map showing Markham Square and the surrounding streets. Saunders' position is marked in red. Marked in yellow is 1 Bywater Street, one of the overlooking positions occupied by police.

On 6 May 2008, shortly before 17:00 (British Summer Time, UTC+1), Saunders fired several shots from his shotgun (a Beretta Silver Pigeon, for which he held a licence for clay pigeon shooting) through a first-floor window and into the square. Several pellets struck buildings opposite, causing neighbours to flee and call the police. An armed response vehicle from the Metropolitan Police, crewed by specially trained officers carrying firearms, arrived shortly afterwards. Saunders fired at the vehicle and a stand-off began. The police called in further armed officers, who surrounded the area, and trained negotiators. At the peak of the incident, 59 armed officers were at the scene, mostly armed with Heckler & Koch MP5 carbines and Glock 17 pistols, though some were armed with longer-range rifles.

Armed police officers took up positions in surrounding buildings. Saunders opened fire in the direction of one officer stationed in a nearby house, and the officer responded by firing three shots at Saunders; neither was hit. Police attempted to contact Saunders on his mobile phone. When negotiators got through, shortly after 19:00, Saunders was obviously heavily intoxicated and was heard vomiting shortly afterwards. Around half an hour into the phone call, Saunders was seen re-loading the shotgun despite the negotiator's request to put it down. An hour into the call, around 20:00, he stopped talking to the police and several minutes after that the phone went dead. Saunders was seen holding the shotgun and a phone while he was out of contact and was continuing to drink heavily. Shortly after 20:30, contact was re-established when Saunders called 999 and asked to be connected with the negotiators. A negotiator, Superintendent John Sutherland, attempted to calm Saunders, who warned that he intended to "end it all" and that he planned to fire more shots. Saunders told Sutherland he was "resigned" to killing himself and asked to speak to his wife.

At 21:09, Saunders fired his shotgun through a window into a building opposite. A police officer returned fire with two shots, wounding Saunders in the arm. Saunders did not resume telephone contact with the negotiators, instead shouting out of an open kitchen window. He demanded to speak to his wife and friend who were at the police command post in a nearby bank, but the police negotiators refused to allow them to speak to Saunders, fearing that he planned to say goodbye before killing himself. Further shouts from Saunders were inaudible over the background noise, including a police helicopter which was providing aerial surveillance and transmitting video to officers on the ground. As darkness fell and the police prepared for a protracted siege, powerful spotlights were installed shortly before 21:30. At 21:32, Saunders began waving the shotgun out of the kitchen window, pointing the barrel up and down. A police officer with a megaphone shouted at Saunders to put the gun down. Saunders continued to wave the shotgun, then lowered it, pointing the barrel in the direction of police officers. Seven police officers fired eleven shots and Saunders collapsed.

Minutes after the last round of shooting, armed police forced entry into Saunders' flat, using CS gas and stun grenades to incapacitate him in case he resisted. Officers found Saunders severely injured and carried him downstairs to a waiting ambulance, where he was pronounced dead. Over 200 live shotgun cartridges were found in the flat, along with eight spent shell casings.

== Investigation ==
As with most police shootings in England and Wales, the case was referred to the Independent Police Complaints Commission (IPCC), who launched an investigation which was expected to take around six months to complete. Three days after the shooting, on 9 May 2008, an inquest was opened at Westminster Coroner's Court under Paul Knapman. Opening statements from the Metropolitan Police and the IPCC revealed that Saunders was hit by at least five police bullets, which struck him in the head, heart, liver, and lower body. The inquest was adjourned until September to allow the IPCC investigation to progress.

The Saunders family applied for judicial review of the IPCC investigation in July 2008, claiming that the inquiry was inadequate because the police officers involved in the shooting had been allowed to confer before giving their statements. The case was dismissed in October 2008 on the grounds that the IPCC was following established practice in line with national guidelines. Nonetheless, the Association of Chief Police Officers announced that it would be revising the guidelines after the judge expressed concern about the practice of officers conferring. A year after the shooting, in May 2009, the IPCC announced that its investigation was complete and that it was passing its files to the Crown Prosecution Service (CPS) for consideration of criminal charges. The following September, the CPS announced that it had considered charges including murder and manslaughter, but would not be bringing charges as there was no evidence that the police officers acted other than in self-defence. In a statement, the CPS recognised that "Saunders was in a distressed state but the police have a duty to protect the public and the right to defend themselves".

== Inquest ==
The inquest did not resume fully until September 2010, presided over by Knapman. Among the witnesses were 12 police firearms officers who were at the scene (they were granted anonymity and identified by their call signs), Saunders' wife, his doctor, and IPCC investigators. Commander Ali Dizaei, who was in charge of the police operation, gave evidence in writing because he was serving a prison sentence for corruption in an unrelated case. The inquest heard that Saunders held several messages up to the window during the siege, including "I can't hear" and "I want to say goodbye and kill myself". Mrs Saunders and a friend testified that they asked the police to be allowed to speak to Saunders, but the police denied their requests and instructed them to switch off their mobile phones to keep Saunders focused on talking to the police negotiators. Patrick Gibbs, representing Mrs Saunders, criticised the police operation and described their handling of the incident as "chaotic", suggesting that it was led principally by a plain-clothed negotiator and a junior uniformed officer rather than by Dizaei, the gold commander. The jury visited the scene of the shooting and were shown video footage of the siege taken from the police helicopter. The police negotiators defended their decision not to allow Saunders to speak to his wife because they worried that he would endanger her or that he planned to kill himself in front of her. Mrs Saunders told the inquest she believed she could have defused the situation had she been allowed to intervene.

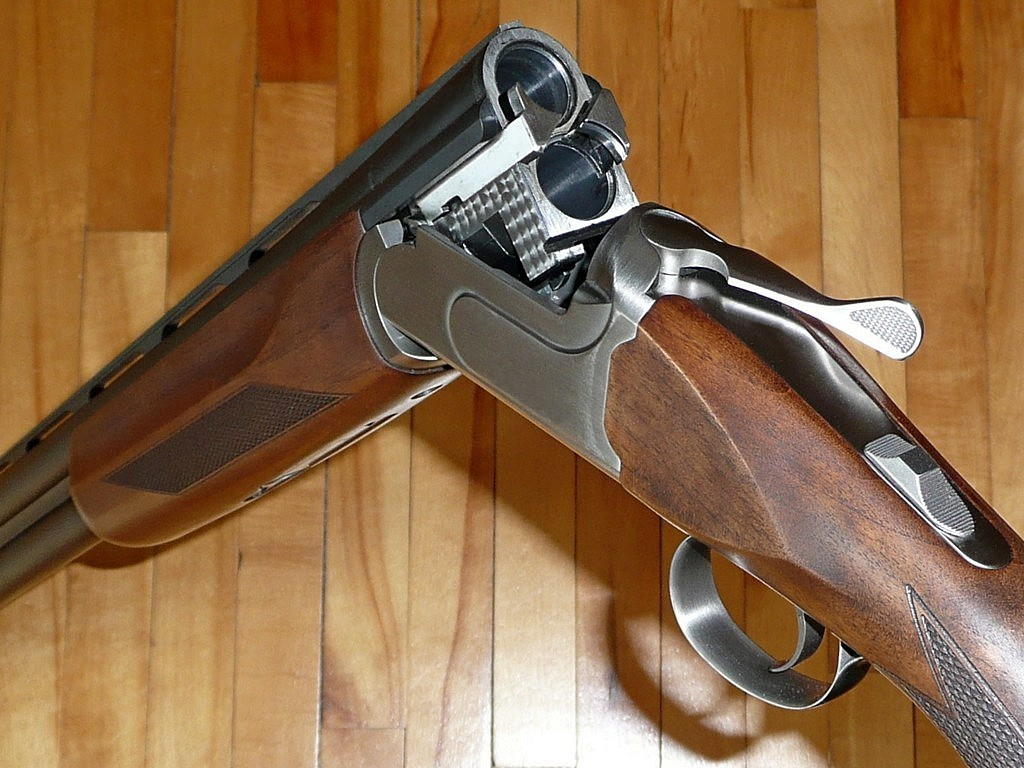
A shotgun in the "open" or "broken" position, meaning it cannot be fired; Saunders' weapon was found in this position when police entered his flat.

The police officers who fired shots gave evidence on 23 September, identified by their call signs instead of their names. The inquest heard that the decision to fire rests with each individual officer. AZ6, who fired at Saunders at 21:09, was stationed in a bedroom window in 1 Bywater Street, overlooking the rear of Markham Square. He testified that he feared for his life and that of the householder when Saunders pointed the shotgun in AZ6's direction and fired. Officer AZ12, one of the seven who fired on Saunders at the conclusion of the siege, told the inquest he fired because he believed Saunders was aiming his shotgun towards officers who were stood on a ledge on an adjacent building. AZ14, who was near AZ12, stated that he decided not to fire because he could not be certain that Saunders presented a threat to other officers. AZ4, who did fire, witnessed the same movement but believed Saunders was bringing the shotgun into a firing position. AZ7, one of the officers on the ledge, said he initially hoped Saunders was moving to drop the shotgun out of the kitchen window and into the garden below. He broke down as he described seeing Saunders apparently pointing the shotgun towards him, and the fear that he was about to be shot which motivated him to fire at Saunders. Pressed on why he did not wait to see if Saunders intended to lower the barrel further, AZ7 replied "In my mind, if he wanted to pull the trigger at that point I would have been too late. I would be dead". During the firearms officers' testimony, the inquest learnt that Saunders' shotgun was in the open position when police broke into the flat, meaning it could not have been fired, though it was unclear whether it was open or closed when Saunders was shot.

Testimony at the inquest revealed that the senior police officers on the scene disagreed on the effect that the spotlights (switched on shortly before the fatal shooting) would have. Some felt that illuminating Saunders was likely to provoke an adverse reaction, while others felt it might prompt him to re-engage with the negotiators. Ultimately, the lights were introduced after complaints from the firearms officers that they could not adequately see Saunders. At the inquest, the tactical firearms advisor (an inspector) denied that the lights were intended to provoke a reaction, and told the court they were intended to minimise the need for overt police action. The inspector also rejected the suggestion that the police could have tried less-lethal methods to incapacitate Saunders—especially a baton round, which he described as "an exceptionally high-risk strategy" which could have provoked a reaction from Saunders. It could also have caused Saunders to step or fall further into the property, requiring police officers to provide assistance and putting them at risk.

The inspector and the silver commander (a superintendent) both testified that they had considered the possibility that Saunders was attempting "suicide by cop", though the silver commander was unaware of significant developments, including Saunders' 999 call and the switching on of the lights. He defended the police tactics and stated that he aimed to "achieve a peaceful resolution to extremely demanding and difficult circumstances when, at that time, shots had been fired again at my officers".

The IPCC commissioned experts from other police forces to review the Metropolitan Police's handling of the siege, two of whom gave evidence at the inquest. Superintendent Liz Watson from South Yorkshire Police agreed with Saunders' widow that there was confusion over the command structure—she testified that it was unclear whether the bronze commander was the tactical advisor or a sergeant identified as SE (the silver commander believed the inspector to be the bronze commander, while the inspector and SE believed that SE was the bronze commander). She observed that the roles of bronze commander and tactical advisor should have been clearly separated, and criticised SE for spending most of his time at the command post rather than with front-line officers. Watson found that the lack of clarity hampered communication between commanders and the firearms officers, and led to a risk of "key decisions being made in isolation". Neither expert believed the problems contributed to the outcome. Watson found the police actions "reasonable and proportionate", and the other expert believed that Saunders was intent on forcing the police to shoot him.

=== Conclusion ===
Knapman summed up the evidence for the jury on 5 October 2010 and instructed them to consider seven points:

- whether the fatal shots were fired in reasonable self-defence or the defence of another
- whether Saunders "deliberately and consciously" provoked the police with the intention of being shot ("suicide by cop")
- whether the police should have given greater consideration to allowing Saunders to talk to his wife
  - if they considered that he should have been allowed contact with his wife, whether the police refusal contributed to the outcome
- whether there was confusion over which police officer was the bronze commander (responsible for instructing and supervising the officers at the scene)
  - if there was such confusion, whether it contributed to Saunders' death
- whether the police gave due consideration to Saunders' vulnerability caused by his intoxication.

Knapman instructed the jurors to "put emotion to one side to decide the issues dispassionately" and "beware also of the advantage of hindsight". He reminded them that for a killing to be lawful, it must be in self-defence or the defence of another, and that the force used must be "reasonable and proportionate".

The jury returned a verdict of lawful killing after two days of deliberations. They could not decide whether Saunders had intended to provoke the police into shooting him, but concluded that the fatal shots were fired lawfully in self-defence. On the other questions, the jury believed that the police should have given more consideration to allowing Saunders to speak to his wife early on in the incident, that the police did not adequately consider Saunders' vulnerability in his drunken state, and that there was confusion over which officer was the bronze commander. The jury did not consider that any of these factors significantly contributed to the outcome of the incident.

Saunders' widow announced after the inquest that she accepted and respected the verdict, and that her aim had been to ensure her husband's death was properly investigated and to hear the explanations of those involved as to why the shooting was necessary. Senior police officers with experience of managing similar incidents felt that the role of the police in containing armed offenders was not widely appreciated, and that the public did not understand the dangers faced by firearms officers. Knapman wrote to the Home Secretary, Theresa May, to express his concern that the police manuals for firearms incidents were excessively long and not widely understood, having devoted several days of the inquest to experts explaining the guidelines. He also wrote to the Metropolitan Police commissioner, Sir Paul Stephenson, setting out the jury's conclusions on the conduct of the operation.

== Impact and analysis ==
The incident was compared in the media to several other police shootings. In particular, journalists from The Guardian and The Independent compared it to the shooting of Jean Charles de Menezes (2005) and the Hackney siege (2002–2003). De Menezes was shot dead in a case of mistaken identity; similar criticisms were made of the Metropolitan Police's control of that incident and the post-incident management, including the practice of officers conferring. In the Hackney incident, police laid siege to a block of flats in East London after a known criminal brandished a firearm at police officers on the street below. The stand-off lasted 15 days and ended with the apparent suicide of the suspect. Some journalists suggested that the police showed a lack of patience in dealing with Saunders when compared to the Hackney siege.

Multiple senior police officers with experience of commanding firearms operations pointed out that protracted confrontations involving armed suspects were extremely rare in the United Kingdom. Bob Quick, a former police officer who was gold commander at the Hackney siege, pointed out that media coverage of that incident criticised the police for taking too long to resolve the situation, and that the police allowed the subject of that siege to speak to his family, with poor results. Quick explained that the police objective in such cases is always to contain the threat and negotiate a resolution, but that the police had a duty to protect public safety. Maurice Punch, a criminologist who researched police use of firearms, described the situation as a "damned if you do, damned if you don't" dilemma. In a BBC interview after the inquest, John O'Connor, a former senior police officer with experience of firearms operations, said "it is about time every senior officer who may be in charge at one of these incidents had specific training". He believed that confusion around the chain of command was common, but "it took an incident involving an upper-middle class lawyer for these issues to come to light", whereas previous incidents involved low-status individuals, particularly career criminals.

At the time of Saunders' death, De Menezes' shooting was still under investigation. An inquest jury returned an open verdict on the latter case in December 2008, prompting a renewed interest in police shootings. According to statistics from the Metropolitan Police, it deployed armed officers to 2,352 incidents in the twelve months to October 2008. Only two of those incidents resulted in police officers opening fire. Besides Saunders, the other person shot was Andrew Hammond, whose death was ruled to be an instance of "suicide by cop". Hammond was shot when he pointed a replica AK-47 at the crew of an armed response vehicle who had been dispatched to a report of a man brandishing a firearm in the street in Harold Hill, north-east London.

In 2010, taking into account the findings of the inquest as well as other incidents, the Metropolitan Police established the Firearms Command Unit, a specialist unit of ranking officers trained as tactical (silver) commanders. The unit was initially responsible for pre-planned operations but was expanded to be on call at all times to take over command of spontaneous firearms incidents where previously local inspectors or superintendents controlled such operations.

== See also ==
- Police use of firearms in the United Kingdom
- List of killings by law enforcement officers in the United Kingdom
