= Ferid Imam =

Ethiopian-born Canadian citizen (born 1980)

- Born: September 28, 1980 (age 45); Ethiopia
- Other names: Yousef
- Known for: allegedly traveled to Pakistan to engage in Jihad

Ferid Imam is an Ethiopian-born Canadian citizen who is believed to have provided military training to al Qaeda jihadists in Pakistan in 2008. Charges filed against him on March 15, 2011, were reported to have been the first time a Canadian had faced terrorism charges for offences alleged to have been committed outside of Canada.

== Life in Canada ==
According to The Globe and Mail In grade 7 Ferid was an "immigrant from East Africa" in the 1990s. They report he was popular in high school and was on the honor roll and soccer team.

One The Globe and Mail article says he studied biochemistry at the University of Manitoba, while another article says he studied pharmacy. He voiced an opinion during the debates of the publication of cartoons that depicted Mohammed, Islam's prophet, calling the publication "a crisis rather than a controversy."

In 2006, he made a pilgrimage to Mecca.

== Alleged jihadi activities ==
In 2007 Imam and two of his friends from Winnipeg, Muhannad al-Farekh and Miawand Yar, traveled to Waziristan, one of Pakistan's loosely controlled Federally Administered Tribal Agencies, where it is believed they sought out jihadis for military training.

On March 15, 2011, the Royal Canadian Mounted Police charged Imam with terrorism related offenses. The Globe and Mail called the charges a "crucial test" of a new anti-terrorism law. They reported it was the first time in Canadian history a Canadian had been charged with a terrorism related offense committed outside Canada. However, The Globe and Mail reported that Canadian and American security officials had sought Imam for years, and the formal charges merely made the search official.

A Bosnian-American named Adis Medunjanin was convicted in 2012. At his trial further allegations against Imam emerged. Najibullah Zazi and Zarein Ahmedzay testified at Medunjanin's trial that the three were friends, who had travelled to Pakistan together, to train for Jihad, and that they were trained by an English speaking individual they knew as "Yousef". Colin Freeze, writing in The Globe and Mail, reported security officials believe "Yousef" is Imam's nom de guerre.

According to that testimony, Imam provided training in the use of hand grenades, rocket propelled grenades and the use, maintenance and assembly and disassembly of AK-47 rifles.

== Whereabouts ==
Imam remains at large. He has been indicted in both the Canadian and US Civil justice systems. Although journalist Colin Freeze speculated that Imam may have been killed by a missile fired from a Predator drone, the United States Department of Justice confirmed in a statement on Farekh's arrest on April 2, 2015 that Imam is still alive and under indictment.
