= Muhanad Mahmoud Al Farekh =

American citizen convicted of terrorism related offenses in 2017

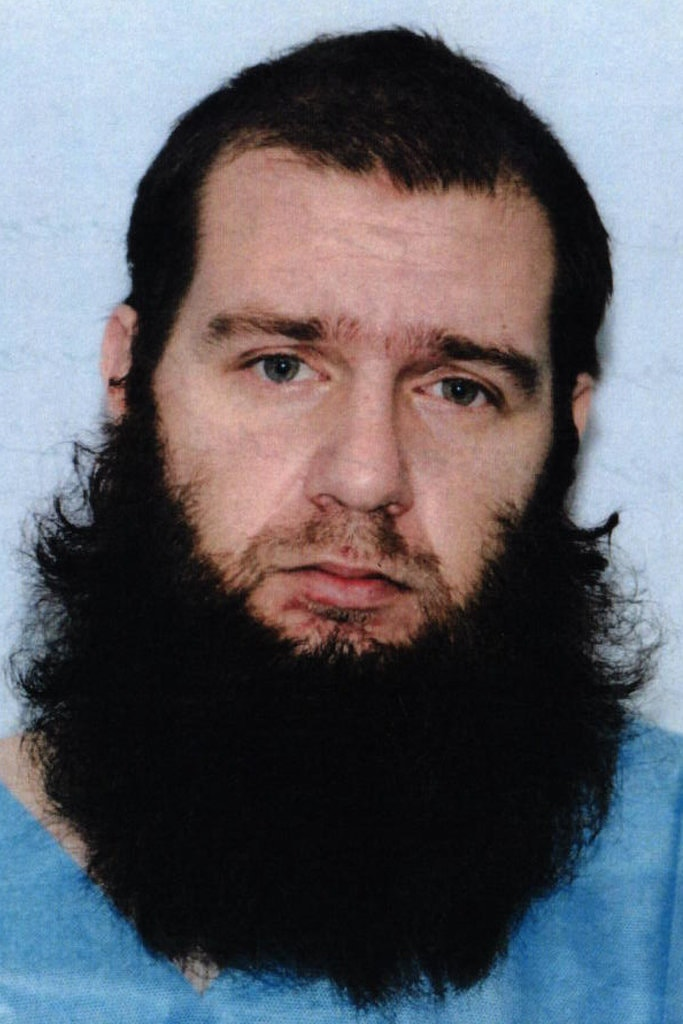
- Born: 1985 (age 40–41); Houston, Texas
- Other name: Abdullah al-Shami
- Known for: convicted of material support of terrorism
- Criminal charge: material support of terrorism
- Criminal penalty: 45 years imprisonment
- Criminal status: Incarcerated at ADX Florence supermax prison in Fremont County, Colorado.

Muhanad Mahmoud Al Farekh (born 1985) is an American citizen who was convicted of terrorism-related offenses in 2017. Al-Farekh joined al Qaeda and attended an al Qaeda training camp in Afghanistan.

He served al Qaeda from 2007 until his capture by Pakistani security officials in 2014. He was returned to the US, stood trial, and was convicted in 2017. He was charged with material support of terrorism for a planning role in a 2009 attack on Forward Operating Base Chapman in Khost, Afghanistan. Al-Farekh's fingerprints were among those found on packing tape used in the vehicle-born improvised explosive devices used in the attack.

Zarein Ahmedzay, convicted off various terror offenses in 2010, testified that he had helped train Al-Farekh.

Although he was born in Texas, he spent most of his childhood in Dubai in the United Arab Emirates. He is reported to have been radicalized by recordings of Anwar al-Awlaki's sermons, while attending university in Manitoba, Canada.

Al Farekh moved to Winnipeg, Canada, in 2003, to live with his grandmother and uncle, to prepare to attend the University of Manitoba.

After his radicalization he made his way to Pakistan with friends Ferid Imam and Maiwand Yar. Al Farekh is reported to have married the daughter of an al Qaeda leader.

The Counter-Terrorism Project reported he worked under an al Qaeda leader named Abdul Hafeez, until his death, when he was promoted to a leadership role, himself.

According to The New York Times, the discovery that Al-Farekh, an American citizen, was engaged with enemies of the US, triggered a debate over the legality of killing a US citizen by missiles fired from unmanned surveillance aircraft. Alan Feuer reported both the Pentagon and the Central Intelligence Agency pushed to have his name placed on a "kill list".

Al Farekh's sentence called for 45 years of imprisonment.
