= Operation Pathway =

- Location: Manchester, Liverpool and Lancashire
- Type: counterterrorism operation

Operation Pathway was a British counterterrorism operation. The operation first came under public scrutiny when details of its activities were accidentally released in April 2009.

The name of the operation, and at least some of its details were inadvertently revealed when Assistant Commissioner for Special Operations Robert Quick was photographed entering Number 10 Downing Street with classified documents in plain sight. The operation was hurriedly executed after the security breach resulting in a dozen arrests of suspects of Pakistani origin in northwest England near Manchester, Liverpool and Lancashire.

Quick resigned on 9 April.

The operation continued following Quick's resignation. On November 9, 2009 The Telegraph reported that the operation produced the tip that lead American security officials to place Najibullah Zazi under investigation. British security officials were reported to have intercepted an email from a Pakistani planner to Najibullah Zazi containing instructions on how to conduct his attack. Najibullah Zazi was alleged to have begun to implement a plan to set off bombs in New York City on the 2009 anniversary of Al Qaeda's WTC attacks on 9-11. His plan was described as the most serious plan against the USA since 9–11.
