= Bob Quick (police officer) =

Bob Quick QPM

Assistant Commissioner (Specialist Operations) Metropolitan Police Service
- In office 2008–2009
- Preceded by: Andy Hayman
- Succeeded by: John Yates

Chief Constable of Surrey Police
- In office 2004–2008
- Preceded by: Denis O'Connor
- Succeeded by: Mark Rowley

Personal details
- Born: Robert Frederick Quick; 25 April 1959 (age 67)
- Citizenship: United Kingdom
- Education: University of Exeter; University of Cambridge

Robert Frederick Quick QPM (born 25 April 1959) is a British former senior police officer. From 2008 to 2009, he was the Assistant Commissioner (Specialist Operations) of London's Metropolitan Police Service at New Scotland Yard. The role is a key national security post with responsibility for counter-terrorism within the United Kingdom, protection of the Queen and senior members of the British royal family, protection of the UK Prime Minister and Cabinet Ministers. He also oversaw the protection of visiting heads of state to the UK and the diplomatic community in London.

== Early life and education ==
Quick was born on 25 April 1959 in London, England. He studied at the University of Exeter, graduating with a Master of Business Administration (MBA) degree, and completed a diploma in applied criminology at the University of Cambridge.

== Police career ==
Quick joined the police service in 1978 at the age of 18, first serving in Lambeth. From 1978 to 1991, he served in a range of positions in both uniform and CID in South London, dealing with armed robbery, drug trafficking, murder and other serious offences.

In 2000 he was appointed head of the Metropolitan Police CIB and Anti-Corruption Command overseeing corruption investigations and public complaints. In November 2001 he led "Operation Safer Streets" in London against robbery and armed crime which resulted in large falls in these crime categories. In December 2002, he took charge of the Hackney siege, a police operation in east London to deal with a gunman who had taken a hostage at a flat in Hackney after shooting at police officers. For this operation he was widely praised for the restraint shown, in what was at the time London's longest armed siege. He was awarded the Queen's Police Medal in the 2002 New Year's Honours for distinguished service.

He later became Chief Constable of Surrey and during his tenure (2004–2008) Surrey Police was rated as one of the best performing forces in England and Wales. In 2008 he was succeeded by Mark Rowley as Chief Constable. Quick then returned to London to become an assistant commissioner of the Metropolitan Police Service.

Since 2018 he has been the managing director of GSA Global Ltd.

== Damian Green investigation; resignations ==
In October 2008, Quick received a complaint from senior officials at the Government Cabinet Office regarding a series of leaks of official documents from the Home Office, which found their way into some national newspapers. Some of the documents were classified as "secret". An ensuing investigation by Quick found that documents had been stolen from the home secretary's safe, including correspondence with the prime minister; this led to the arrest of senior civil servant Christopher Galley who implicated two prominent opposition MPs. Galley was sacked for gross professional misconduct.

After consultations with the Crown Prosecution Service (CPS) one of these MPs, Damian Green, was arrested for aiding or abetting misconduct in public office and the police searched the MP's home and his parliamentary office, which caused a political furore.

Opposition Conservative MPs claimed the police were acting under the orders of, or with knowledge of, the then-Home Secretary, Jacqui Smith. Evidence was later taken by Parliament, which proved these claims to be unfounded (Hansard).

No search warrant was obtained for the raid on Green's office in the House of Commons and permission for the search was given by the Serjeant at Arms, who is in charge of Commons security, not by the Speaker.

A subsequent Parliamentary inquiry concluded the police had "followed the correct procedures", there being a requirement on the police to seek consent of the Parliamentary Authorities for the search (which was given) before resorting to applying for a search warrant. The controversy continued whilst an investigation into the leaks continued. The MPs claimed parliamentary privilege over the material seized by police, which prevented the material being examined for several weeks. During the investigation a series of press articles were published criticising the arrest of Green. An articles also appeared with details of Quick's wife's business. In response, Quick made public comments suggesting Conservative politicians and the press were seeking to undermine him. He later withdrew the allegations.

An Inspectorate of Constabulary review of the case described the use of police resources as "questionable"; an internal police review concluded that arresting Green was "not proportionate". The Crown Prosecution Service decided there was insufficient evidence to prosecute either Galley or Green because the information leaked to Green on the government's immigration policy was not secret and did not affect national security or put lives at risk. The two had been warned they could face life imprisonment if convicted.

On 8 April 2009, when Quick arrived at a briefing at 10 Downing Street he inadvertently exposed a document marked Secret dealing with "Operation Pathway" to photographers which compromised the counter-terrorist operation which the document concerned, forcing police in the North West of England to strike sooner than planned, making twelve arrests within hours. He resigned the following day and was replaced by John Yates. Quick later suggested that he would not have needed to resign if political forces had not been angered by his arrest of Green.

Reacting to his resignation, the president of the Association of Chief Police Officers said Quick had "led a number of critical counter-terror operations over the past year or so and we are all the safer for that"; the home secretary and prime minister thanked Quick for his contributions. London Mayor Boris Johnson said he accepted Quick's resignation with "great reluctance and sadness".

Within days of Quick's resignation, a decision was taken by the Director of Public Prosecutions, Keir Starmer QC, not to prosecute Green or the senior civil servant involved, Christopher Galley. The commentary on the decision highlighted that:

In coming to a conclusion in this case, it has not been necessary for me to resolve the question of the legality of the searches of Mr Galley's home address and Mr Green's home address, his Constituency offices and at his Parliamentary office. I do not propose to do so. However, as noted above, once the pattern of leaks was established in this case it was inevitable that a police investigation would follow. There has been a thorough investigation and, without it, I would not have been able to reach a conclusion on the particular facts of this case

— Keir Starmer QC

Later in 2012, Quick testified under oath at the Leveson Public Inquiry into "the culture, practices and ethics of the press, including contacts between the press and police" that a series of misleading articles about the case appeared in the press during the investigation quoting "senior police sources" and that he had come under pressure at the outset to drop the investigation before the evidence has been examined. He stated that he had resisted this on the basis he had duty in law to fully investigate the Cabinet Office allegations that the leaks constituted criminal offences on the basis of CPS advice.

In 2017, the Green controversy was revived when Quick told journalists that the police had found pornography on a computer seized from the politician's office during the 2008 raids. Green said: "The allegations about the material and computer, now nine years old, are false, disreputable political smears from a discredited police officer acting in flagrant breach of his duty to keep the details of police investigations confidential, and amount to little more than an unscrupulous character assassination." Quick commented that, "I bear no malice to Damian Green".

Subsequently, Green was found to have lied and was asked to resign from the Cabinet by Prime Minister Theresa May.

Police appointments
Preceded by Denis O'Connor	Chief Constable of Surrey Police; 2004–2008	Succeeded by Mark Rowley
Preceded by Andy Hayman	Metropolitan Police Service; Assistant Commissioner (Specialist Operations); 2008–2009	Succeeded by John Yates
