= Najibullah Zazi =

Afghan-American member of Al-Qaeda (born 1985)

- نجيب الله زازي
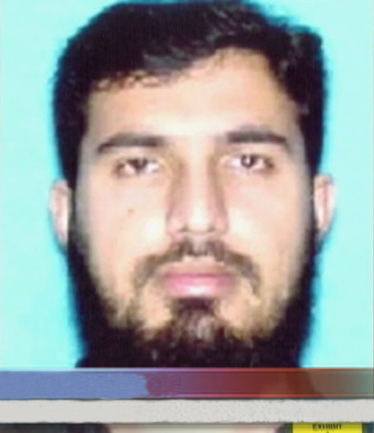
- Mugshot of Zazi
- Born: August 10, 1985 (age 41); Paktia Province, Afghanistan
- Occupation: Airport shuttle bus driver
- Parent: Mohammed Wali Zazi (father)
- Status: Released
- Motive: Martyrdom in Islam, Islamic terrorism
- Conviction: Pleaded guilty (February 22, 2010)
- Criminal charges: i) conspiring to use weapons of mass destruction (explosive bomb); ii) conspiracy to commit murder in a foreign country; and; iii) providing material support to a terrorist organization
- Penalty: 10 years' imprisonment

Najibullah Zazi (Arabic: نجيب الله زازي, Pashto: نجیب الله ځاځی; born August 10, 1985) is an Afghan-American who was arrested in September 2009 as part of the U.S. al Qaeda group accused of planning suicide bombings on the New York City Subway system, and who pleaded guilty as have two other defendants. U.S. prosecutors said Saleh al-Somali, al-Qaeda's head of external operations, and Rashid Rauf, an al-Qaeda operative, ordered the attack. Both were later killed in drone attacks.

Zazi underwent weapons and explosives training at an al-Qaeda training camp in Pakistan in 2008. On September 9, 2009, he drove from his home in Aurora, Colorado, to New York City, intending to detonate explosives on the New York City subway during rush hour as one of three coordinated suicide "martyrdom" bombings. Spooked, however, by surveillance from U.S. intelligence, and warned by a local imam that the authorities were inquiring about him, he abruptly flew back to Colorado. He was arrested days later.

On February 22, 2010, he pleaded guilty to conspiring to use weapons of mass destruction, conspiring to commit murder in a foreign country, and providing material support to a terrorist organization. He said he was recruited by al-Qaeda in Pakistan for a suicide "martyrdom" attack against the U.S., and that his bombing target was the New York City subway system. Zazi faced a possible life sentence without possibility of parole for the first two counts, and an additional sentence of 15 years for the third count. Sentencing was initially scheduled to take in June 2011. In May 2019, it was announced Zazi would be released from prison after serving 10 years due to extensive cooperation with law enforcement.

Two of his high school classmates who had traveled with him to Pakistan, his father, his uncle, and an imam from Queens were indicted on related charges. U.S. Attorney General Eric Holder referred to the planned attack as "one of the most serious terrorist threats to our nation since September 11, 2001."

== Early life ==
Zazi was born in a village in Paktia Province, Afghanistan to a Zazai Pashtun family. He has two sisters and two brothers. At the age of seven in 1992, he and his family moved to the city of Peshawar in Pakistan where they settled as Afghan refugees.

In 1999, he and the family left Pakistan and immigrated to New York City. They moved into a two-bedroom apartment in the Flushing, Queens section of the city. Mohammed Wali Zazi, Najibullah's father and now a naturalized U.S. citizen, found work as a New York City taxi driver.

From 1999–2009, Zazi lived with his family in Flushing. While he was a teenager, he and his family lived in the same apartment building as, and attended the same mosque, the Afghan Hazrat-i-Abu Bakr Sadiq mosque, as did its imam, Saifur Rahman Halimi. Halimi was a vocal pro-global jihad imam. He was chief representative to Gulbuddin Hekmatyar, an Afghan warlord who was declared a "Specially Designated Global Terrorist" by the U.S. in 2003. Halimi and the Zazi family, among others, left the mosque at the same time, during a leadership disagreement. According to one of his friends, Zazi liked listening to Zakir Naik, an Indian Muslim televangelist who is an expert on comparative religion and theology.

Zazi struggled as a student at Flushing High School in Queens, eventually dropping out. From 2004–09, he operated a coffee and pastries vending cart on Stone Street in Lower Manhattan's Financial District., displaying a "God Bless America" sign on his cart.

In 2006, he traveled to Pakistan and married his 19-year-old cousin in an arranged marriage. He claimed that several trips he made to Pakistan between 2006 and 2008 were to visit his wife. In the course of his visits, Zazi and his wife had two children, whom he planned to relocate to the U.S.

== Events leading to arrest ==
=== Al-Qaeda training and direction ===
On August 28, 2008, Zazi and others flew from New York to Peshawar, Pakistan, a city just east of Pakistan's volatile Federally Administered Tribal Areas (the FATA). The Center for Strategic and International Studies describes the FATA as:

ground zero in the U.S. Jihadist war, and home to many al-Qaeda operatives, especially the numerous foreigners from the Arab world, Central Asia Muslim areas of the Far East, and even Europe who flock to this war zone for training [and] indoctrination.

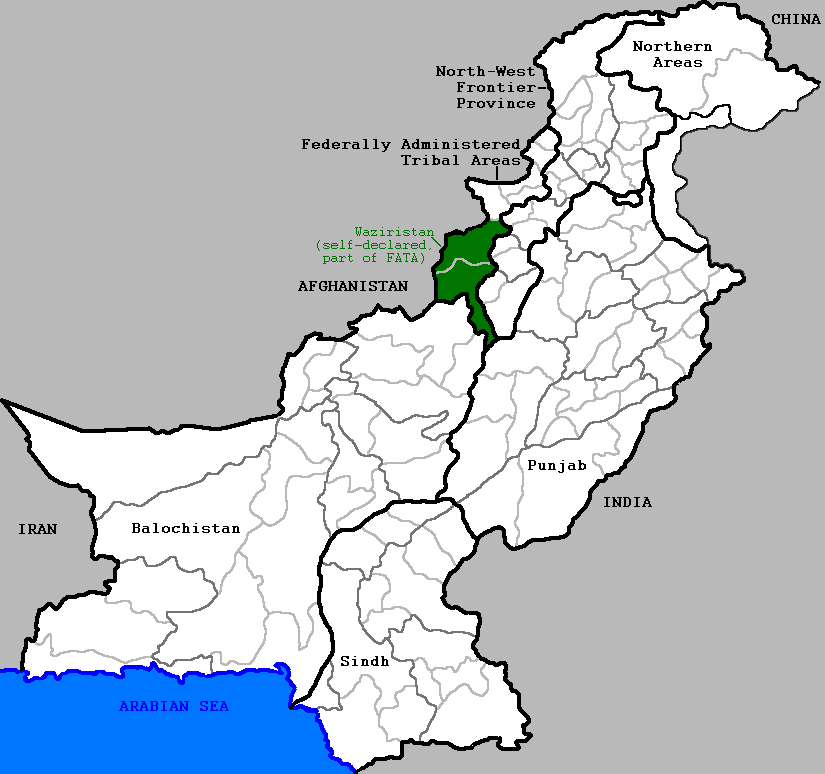
Map of Pakistan and Waziristan

While there, they were recruited by al-Qaeda instead, and taken to a training camp in Waziristan, where they received training on several kinds of weapons. Al-Qaeda leaders asked them to return to the U.S. and conduct a martyrdom operation, and they agreed to do so. Later, he received additional training at the camp on explosives construction for an attack in the U.S., or to carry out a martyrdom operation. He took lengthy notes and emailed them to himself, so he could access them upon his return to the U.S. Al-Qaeda leaders also discussed target locations with Zazi, such as New York City subways. He gave money and computers to al-Qaeda before leaving Pakistan.

==== Bryant Neal Vinas ====
Zazi met American Bryant Neal Vinas in Pakistan in 2008. Vinas, born in Queens, had also traveled to Pakistan (in November 2007) to join a jihadist group to fight against the U.S. military in Afghanistan.

Vinas was also recruited by al-Qaeda, and taken to a training camp in Waziristan. There, he also underwent weapons and explosives training (from late 2007 through August 2008). A senior al-Qaeda leader also discussed the operation of the New York City transit system with Vinas, in his case to help plan a bomb attack on a Long Island Rail Road commuter train in New York's Penn Station. Vinas was arrested in Peshwar, Pakistan, in November 2008, and pleaded guilty in the U.S. in February 2010 to participating in and supporting al-Qaeda plots in Afghanistan and the U.S.

==== Jihad Jane plot ====
Over the internet, Zazi befriended Jamie Paulin-Ramirez, a Kansas City, Missouri-born medical assistant from Leadville, Colorado, who had converted to Islam, according to her family. She was arrested in March 2010 in the Jihad Jane plot to wage jihad and murder Swedish artist Lars Vilks, collecting the bounty offered by an al-Qaeda affiliate for his assassination.

=== Return to United States ===
On January 15, 2009, Zazi returned to the United States Within days of his return, he moved to Aurora, Colorado, to live with his aunt and uncle. He worked as a driver for a company named "Big Sky", and then for ABC Airport Shuttle, driving a 15-person airport shuttle van between Denver International Airport and downtown Denver. Zazi filed for bankruptcy in New York State on March 26, 2009, with $51,000 in debts, and his bankruptcy was discharged on August 17, 2009. He lived with his aunt and uncle until July 2009, when his parents moved to Aurora from New York, and the three took up residence together.

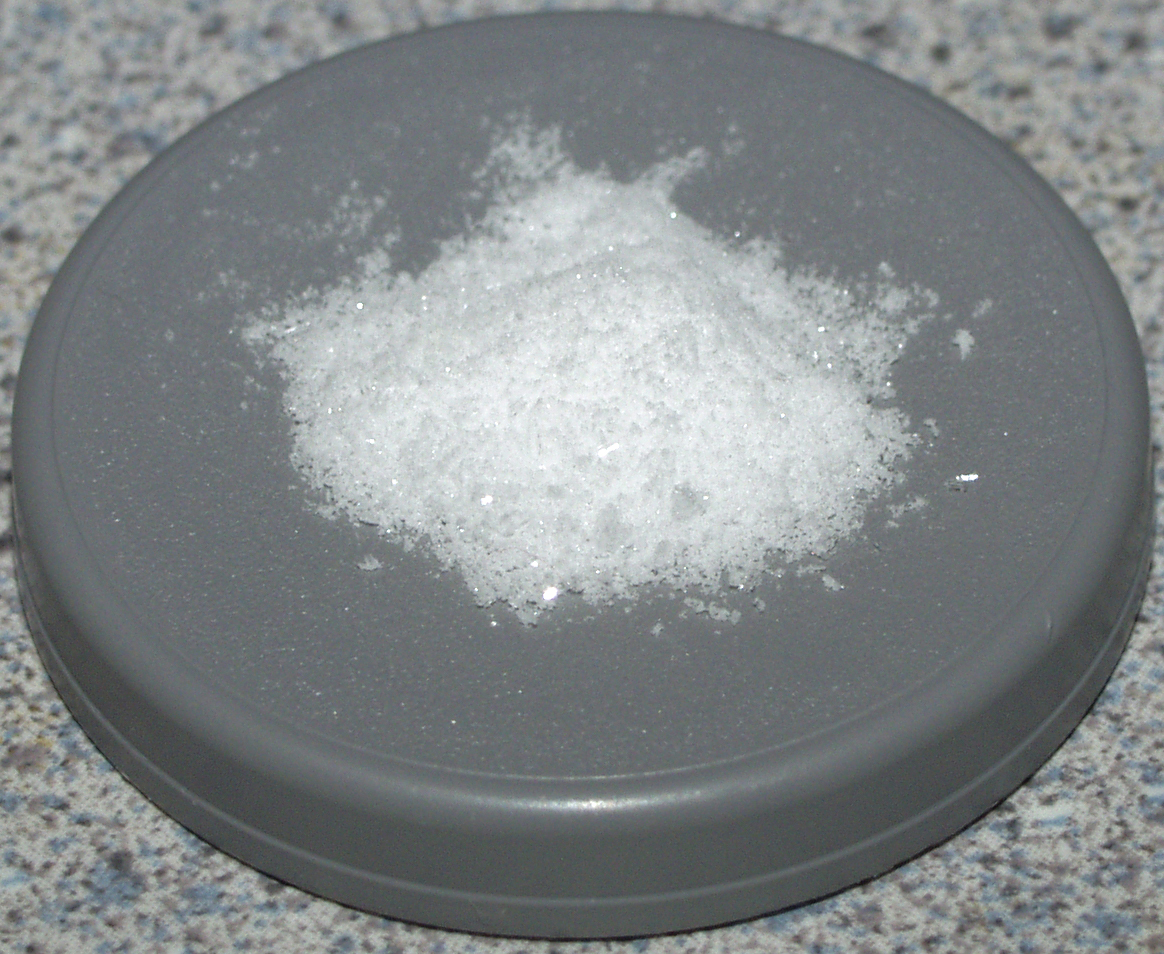
Acetone peroxide

Beginning around June 2009, he began looking for ingredients to make bombs. He conducted several internet searches for hydrochloric acid. He made some acetone peroxide for use as a detonator. He went to New York, where he reportedly had planning sessions with other conspirators.

Over the course of several months, the FBI listened to Zazi's phone conversations. In August 2009, the FBI overheard him speaking about mixing chemical substances. It learned that in July and August 2009 he and his three associates were buying large quantities of hydrogen peroxide and acetone products from beauty supply stores around Denver, Colorado. Workers at the Beauty Supply Warehouse in Aurora, Colorado would later tell CNN that Zazi was "a regular" at the store and had made several recent purchases shortly before his arrest, telling them that he had "a lot of girlfriends." Hydrogen peroxide and acetone are components of triacetone triperoxide (TATP; also known as acetone peroxide)-based bombs. TATP was also used in the 2005 London subway bombings, and by Richard Reid, the "shoe bomber". According to the United States Department of Justice, JPEG images of nine pages of handwritten formulations and instructions for making and handling TATP and other explosives were found in one of Zazi's email accounts; they mention that acetone is found in nail polish remover, and that hydrogen peroxide can be found in "Hair Salon - 20-30%."

Zazi checked into an Aurora motel suite on August 28 and on September 6 and 7, and used the room's kitchenette to create chemicals for use in bombs. Authorities examined the kitchenette, and found traces of chemicals in the vent.

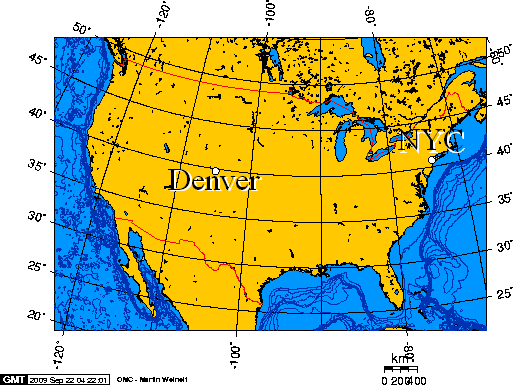
Zazi drove from Denver to New York City on September 9 and 10, 2009.

On September 9, 2009, he began a 1,800 miles (2,900 km) drive in a rented car from Denver to New York with bomb-making materials. Agents followed him. The day after he left Denver, two New York City Police Department Intelligence Division detectives asked imam Ahmad Wais Afzali, a Muslim cleric whom they had developed as an informant, to identify and provide information with regard to four individuals whose photographs they showed him. Afzali identified Zazi, who had prayed at Afzali's mosque, and two of the other three photos.

Zazi arrived in New York City on the afternoon of September 10, and spent the night at the residence of his childhood friend Naiz Kahn in Flushing, Queens. He intended to finish building the bomb that weekend.

=== Bombing plot ===
The plan was for him and two high school friends to conduct coordinated suicide bombings early in the week. They planned to detonate backpack bombs on New York City Subway trains near New York's two busiest subway stations, the Grand Central and Times Square stations in Manhattan, during rush hour. They planned to board the middle of packed trains on the 1, 2, 3, and/or 6 trains, to cause maximum casualties. Zazi rode the subway numerous times to try to determine where to set off the bombs. According to TIME, authorities believe Zazi was possibly planning an attack using backpack bombs, as previously used in the Madrid and London bombings.

The Daily Telegraph reported that the plot had been uncovered by Scotland Yard, which intercepted an e-mail from a senior al-Qaeda member in Pakistan to Zazi, instructing him how to implement his attack. The e-mail was intercepted as part of "Operation Pathway". Scotland Yard notified the FBI, which led to the operation that resulted in his arrest.

=== Capture ===
On September 10, as he crossed the George Washington Bridge headed for New York City, Zazi was pulled over by Port Authority Police, acting at the FBI's request, for what he was told was a routine random drug search, and his car was searched. They did not find anything of note, and he was allowed to go. Afzali's lawyer later wrote the court: "Even though [Zazi] is not the brightest bulb in the terrorist chandelier, the thinly-transparent ruse of a 'random' checkpoint stop did not fool him."

On September 11, Afzali called Zazi's father. Zazi's father then spoke with Zazi, told him that "they" had shown Afzali his photos and photos of others, said Afzali would call him and he should speak with him as soon as possible, and added "So, before anything else, speak with [Afzali]. See if you need to go to [Afzali] or to make ... yourself aware, hire an attorney." Afzali called Zazi, and told him that the authorities had asked him about "you guys." He also asked Zazi for the telephone number of one of the other men whose photos he had been shown, and set up a meeting with him.

Later that day, Zazi's rental car was towed due to a parking violation, and was searched. Agents found a laptop with a JPEG image of nine handwritten pages on how to make initiating explosives, main explosive charges, detonators, and fuses. The FBI asserted the nine pages of handwritten notes were in Zazi's handwriting.

Zazi called Afzali, said his car had been stolen and he feared he was being "watched", and that the people watching him took his car. Afzali asked if there was any "evidence" in the car, and Zazi said no.

When Zazi realized they were under investigation, the group threw away their bomb-making materials.

=== Arrest and incarceration ===
On September 12, Zazi flew back to Denver. FBI agents searched several homes in New York on September 14, and found his fingerprints on an electronic scale and several AA batteries at the home he had stayed at in Queens, as well as a dozen black backpacks. An alert was issued to American law enforcement officials to be on the lookout for hydrogen peroxide-based bombs.

On September 16, Zazi voluntarily appeared and was interviewed by members of the Joint Terrorism Task Force at the Denver FBI offices in the presence of his lawyer. During his eight-hour interview, he denied knowing anything about the nine-page handwritten document found on his hard drive, and speculated he must have accidentally downloaded it in August as part of a religious book which he had downloaded and later deleted. In subsequent interviews on September 17 and 18, however, he acknowledged receiving explosives and weapons training in the tribal areas of Pakistan.

On September 19, 2009, authorities arrested Zazi, and on September 21 they charged him in the United States District Court for the District of Colorado with making false statements in a matter involving international and domestic terrorism.

He testified against fellow American al-Qaeda recruit Muhanad Mahmoud Al Farekh at his trial in 2017. He testified he provided Al Farekh with military training when he arrived in 2007.

== Charges ==
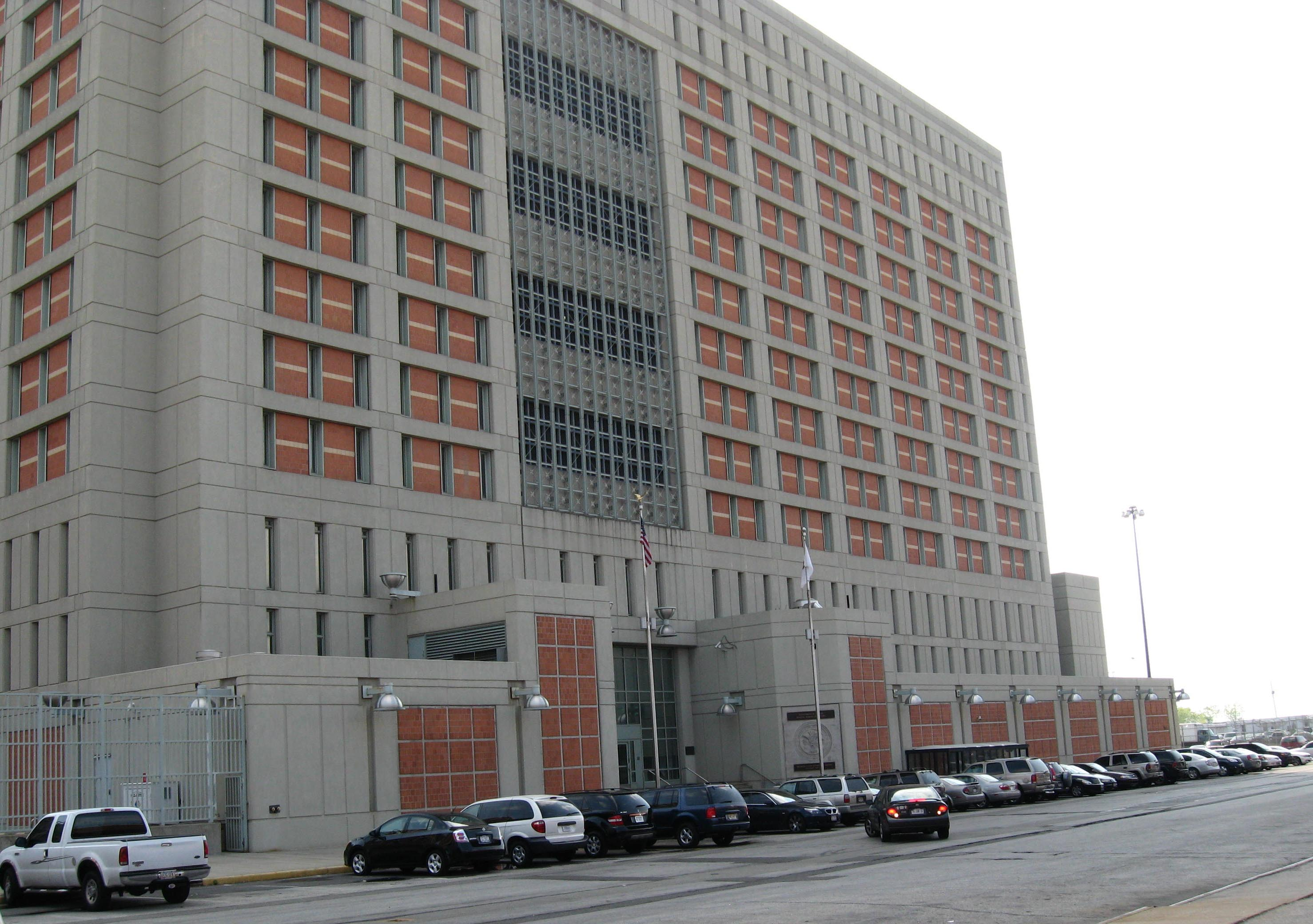
Metropolitan Detention Center, Brooklyn

=== Najibullah Zazi ===
New charges and allegations were filed against Zazi in the Eastern District of New York on September 23, 2009, and the prior charges dropped. A federal grand jury there returned an indictment charging him with conspiracy to use weapons of mass destruction.

Zazi was initially held as a federal inmate (registration # 36553-013) at the Metropolitan Detention Center, Brooklyn. He was held without bail, and was initially scheduled to be sentenced June 25, 2010. By mid-April 2010, however, he had been moved to a secret location.

=== Adis Medunjanin and Zarein Ahmedzay ===
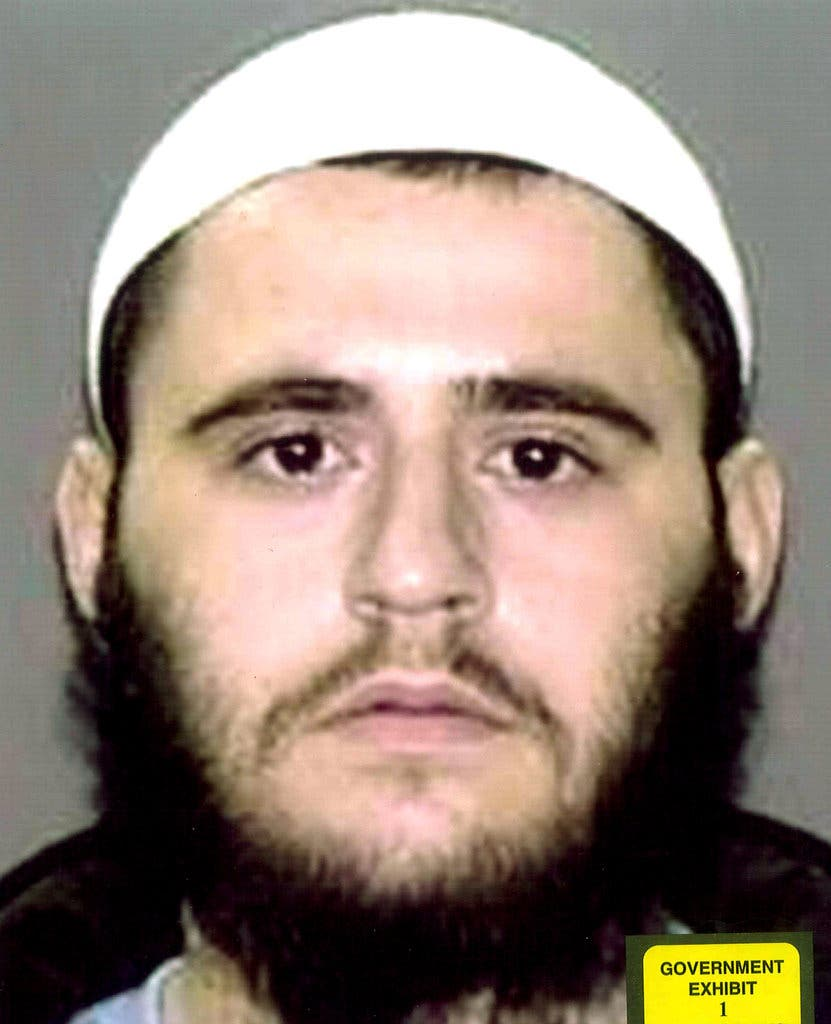
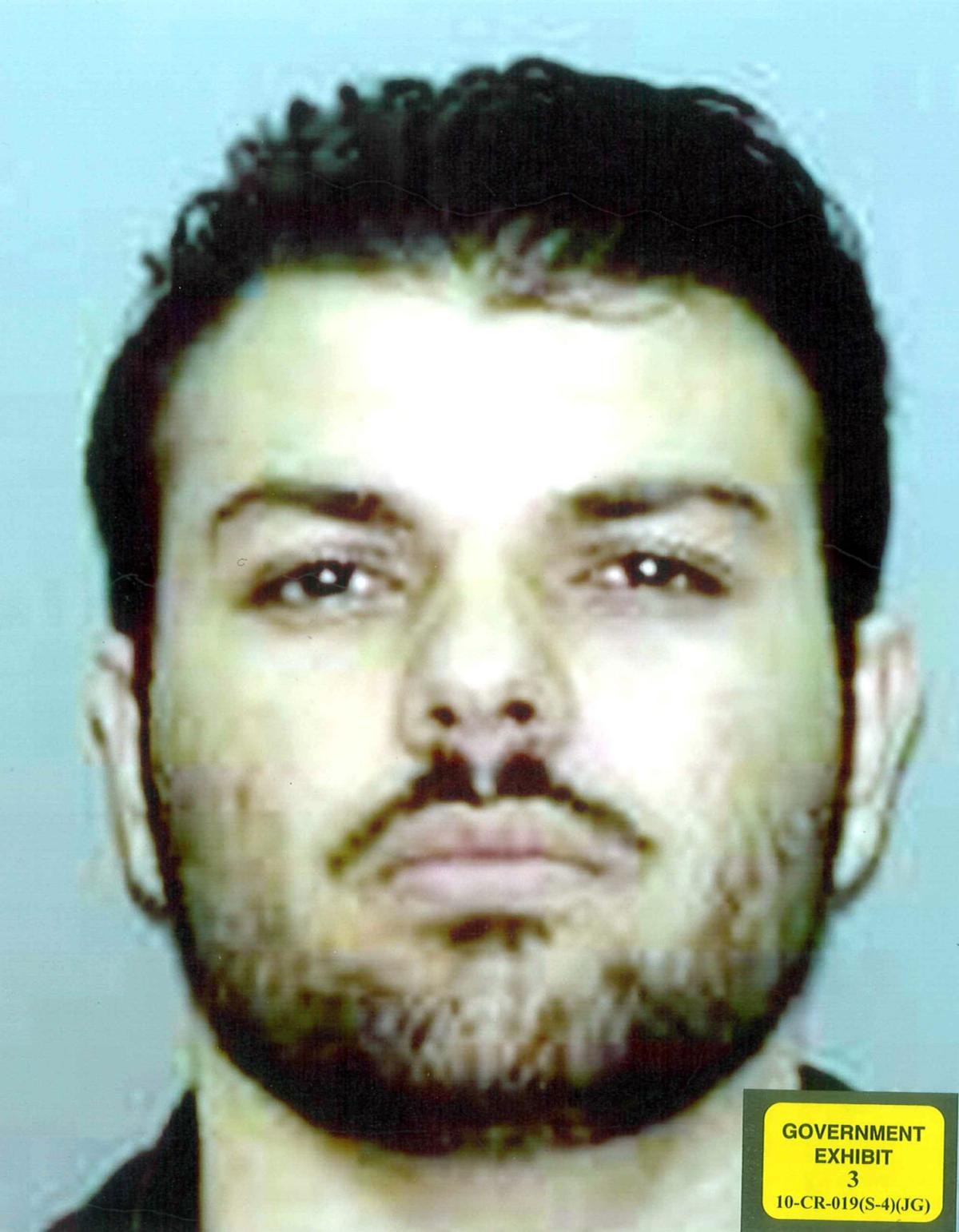
Adis Medunjanin (left) and Zarein Ahmedzay (right)

On January 7, 2010, the FBI also arrested two of his high school classmates from Queens, Adis Medunjanin and Zarein Ahmedzay, who had traveled with him to Pakistan in 2008. They were held without bail. Both Medunjanin and Ahmedzay were indicted for receiving military-type training from al-Qaeda.

Medunjanin is a Bosnian immigrant who came to the U.S. in 1994, was naturalized in 2002, and lived in Flushing, Queens. He played on his high school football team and graduated from Queens College with a degree in economics in June 2009. He worked as a building manager at a property management company. On January 7, 2010, while police were executing a search warrant at Medunjanin's residence, he left his apartment and attempted to turn his car into a weapon of terror and become a martyr. Moments before crashing into the rear of another car on the Whitestone Expressway and fleeing on foot, Medunjanin called 9-1-1, identified himself and left his message of martyrdom, during which he invoked the name of Allah, shouting an al-Qaeda slogan: "We love death more than you love your life"—a refrain al-Qaeda trainers used to inspire recruits to commit murder and suicide. He reportedly told authorities he trained with Zazi in the al-Qaeda camp in Waziristan, Pakistan. He reportedly discussed possible target locations in Manhattan, including the subway system, Grand Central Station, the New York Stock Exchange, Times Square, and movie theaters to carry out suicide bombings during the Muslim holiday of Ramadan. Medunjanin pleaded not guilty to charges of conspiracy to kill U.S. soldiers in Afghanistan and receiving military-style training from al-Qaeda. On February 25, 2010, he pleaded not guilty to additional charges of conspiracy to use weapons of mass destruction, conspiracy to commit murder in a foreign country, and providing material support to al-Qaeda.

==== Conviction of Medunjanin ====
On May 21, 2012, Medunjanin was found guilty of conspiring to use weapons of mass destruction, conspiring to commit murder of U.S. military personnel abroad, providing and conspiring to provide material support to al-Qaeda, receiving military training from al-Qaeda, conspiring and attempting to commit an act of terrorism transcending national boundaries, and using firearms and destructive devices in relation to these offenses.

On November 16, 2012, United States federal judge John Gleeson sentenced him to life imprisonment. When asked if he had anything to say, Medunjanin responded by reciting several verses from the Quran before launching into a critique of US foreign policy.

On October 6, 2020, Medunjanin's sentence was reduced to 95 years.

==== Zarein Ahmedzay ====
Ahmedzay, a New York City cab driver born in Afghanistan and living in Flushing, Queens, tested to become a city firefighter in 2007. He initially pleaded not guilty to a charge of making false statements to the FBI about his activities in Pakistan and Afghanistan. On February 25, 2010, he also pleaded not guilty to additional charges of conspiracy to use weapons of mass destruction, conspiracy to commit murder in a foreign country, and providing material support to al-Qaida. However, on April 23, he pleaded guilty to the charges. He told the court that two Senior Al-Qaeda leaders sought him out because of his familiarity with New York, that the leaders "said the most important thing was to hit well-known structures and to maximize the number of casualties," he made the decision to attack the subways, a decision that was based on the amount of explosives he could access. He met with al-Qaeda leaders Saleh al-Somali and Rashid Rauf, who explained that Najibullah Zazi, Ahmedzay, and Medunjanin "would be more useful to al-Qaeda and the jihad by returning to New York and conducting terrorist attacks." He traveled to Waziristan for terrorist training and discussed bomb plots similar to those of Medunjanin. His motive was to end alleged wars against Islam. At one point he hesitated, but later resolved to carry out the plot. He then claimed "the real enemies of this country are the ones destroying this country from within. And I believe these are the special group, the Zionist Jews, I believe, who want a permanent shadow government within the government of the United States of America." On December 14, 2018, he was sentenced to 10 years in prison.

=== Mohammed Wali Zazi ===
On September 19, 2009, authorities also arrested his father, Mohammed Wali Zazi, for destroying evidence. He was released on $50,000 bond and was placed under house arrest. He was convicted in July 2011 of destroying evidence and lying to investigators to cover up his son's plot. On Friday, February 10, 2012, he was sentenced to four and a half years in prison for obstructing the federal investigation of his son.

=== Imam Ahmad Wais Afzali ===
American authorities also arrested imam Ahmad Wais Afzali, who was charged with and convicted of lying to the FBI about a conversation in which Afzali informed Zazi he was under surveillance. Afzali was formerly a resident of Flushing, Queens, and legal permanent resident of the U.S., born in Kabul, Afghanistan. He was an imam at a Queens mosque, and ran the Islamic Burial Funeral Service, a Queens funeral parlor. He was charged with having told Zazi that he was being watched, and lying to the FBI in a matter involving terrorism. He initially pleaded not guilty, faced up to eight years in prison and deportation if convicted, and was freed on $1.5 million bail.

On March 4, in a plea bargain he pleaded guilty to a reduced charge of lying to U.S. federal agents, and said he was sorry. Afzali faced up to six months in prison, and as part of the plea arrangement the government agreed not to request any jail time. Brooklyn federal judge Frederic Block sentenced him on April 15. As part of his plea agreement, Afzali voluntarily left the U.S. in July 2010, within 90 days of his conviction. As a felon and under the terms of his plea bargain Afzali may not return to the U.S. unless given special permission.

Afzali denied any intention of aiding terrorism or misleading authorities, and according to his lawyer he was "caught in a turf war between the NYPD and the FBI." His last words in the United States were "God Bless America," according to his lawyer.

=== Naqib Jaji ===
Zazi's uncle by marriage, Naqib Jaji, had lived in Queens before moving to Colorado. He was also arrested. Jaji was brought before a judge in closed proceedings on January 14, 2010. He is believed to have pleaded not guilty to one felony count for participating with Zazi's father in the attempt to dispose of evidence. He was released on January 22.

=== Fourth suspect ===
On April 12, 2010, it was reported that a fourth suspect, an unidentified Pakistani citizen, was arrested in Pakistan. It was anticipated that he would be extradited to the U.S., and tried in Brooklyn Federal Court with Medunjanin and Ahmedzay on charges that he helped orchestrate the planned attack. One or two more suspects are being sought outside the U.S.

== Guilty plea ==
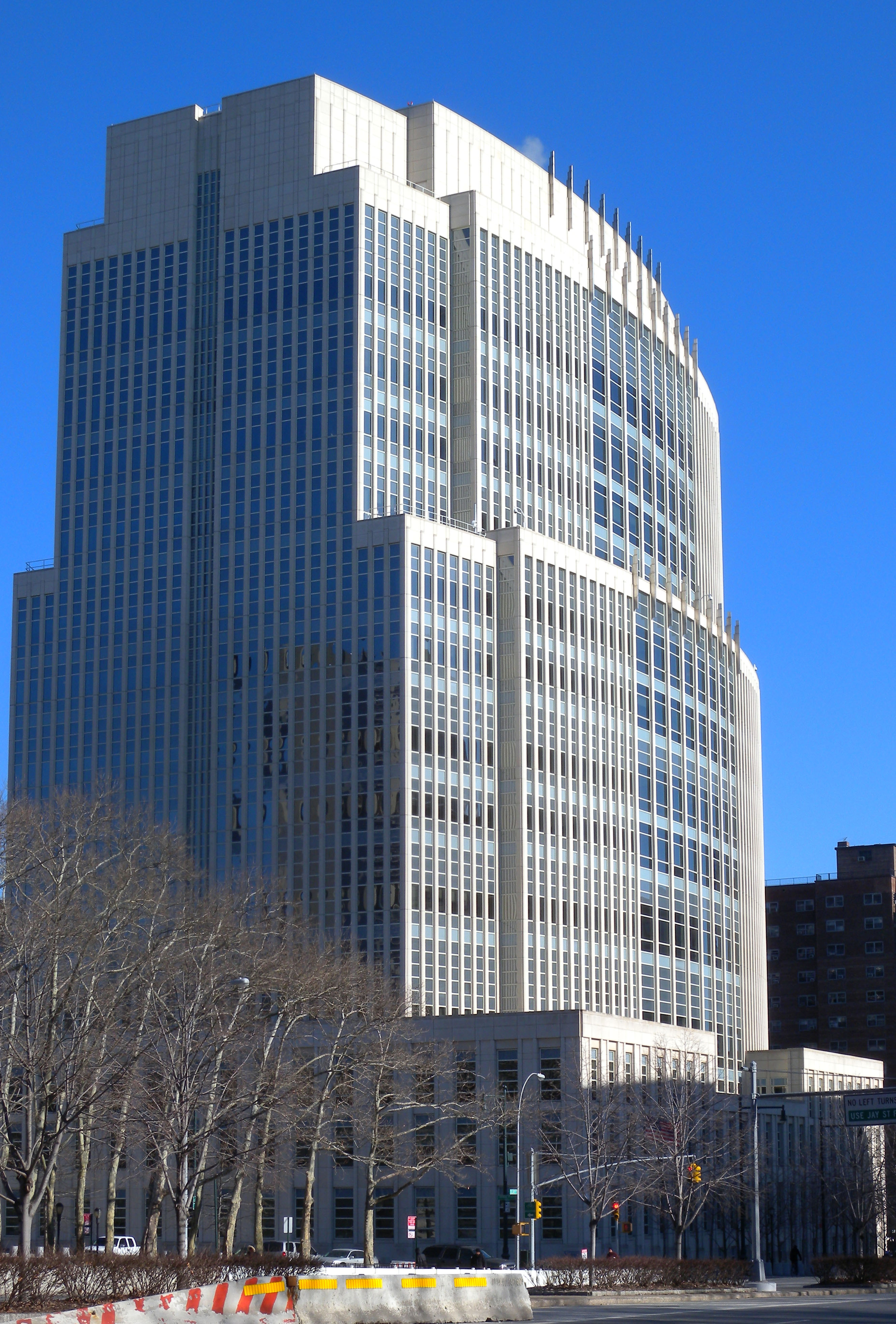
Brooklyn federal courthouse

Zazi cooperated after being told that his parents could be charged with immigration fraud.

On February 22, 2010, Zazi pleaded guilty to conspiring to use weapons of mass destruction (a bomb), conspiracy to commit murder in a foreign country, and providing material support to a terrorist organization, before Chief Judge of the United States District Court for the Eastern District of New York Raymond J. Dearie. His guilty plea was the result of a plea bargain with the prosecution.

He refused to name which subway line was the target of the plot. He said the intent of his suicide mission was to draw attention to activities of the U.S. military in Afghanistan.

Zazi faced a possible life sentence without possibility of parole for the first two counts, and an additional sentence of 15 years for the third count. Sentencing was initially scheduled to take place on June 24, 2011. Sentencing was extensively delayed while Zazi cooperated with law enforcement. In 2019 Zazi was sentenced to ten years in prison (effectively, time served), and released.

== 2025 Arrest ==
On 13 September 2025, Zazi was arrested in North Carolina for violating the terms of his release. Zazi is accused of communicating with “individuals or organizations that are affiliated with foreign terrorist organizations.” The charges were based on four payments, totaling several hundred dollars, sent anonymously to the prison commissary accounts of his friends and former co-conspirators, Zarein Ahmedzay and Adis Medunjanin. According to Zazi's lawyer, the payments, sent in March, were part of Mr. Zazi’s annual religious charitable giving to the poor, or zakat. He pleaded not guilty.
