= Markham Square =

Garden square in the Royal Borough of Kensington and Chelsea

Coordinates: 51°29′22.98″N 0°9′52.37″W

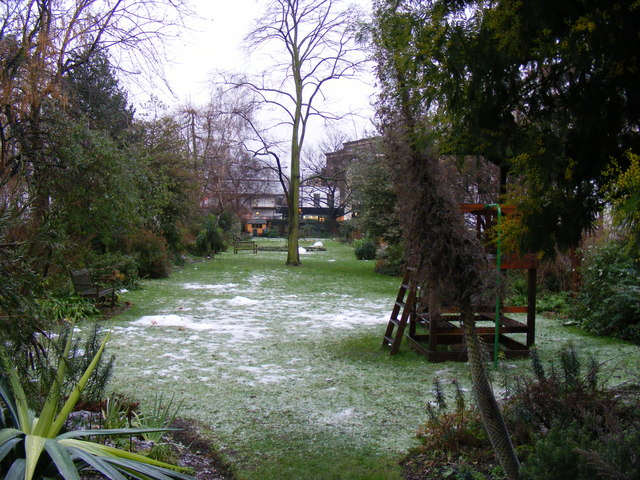
Gardens in Markham Square

Markham Square is a garden square in Chelsea, London. It was laid out in 1836. The square is accessed from the King's Road.

A Congregational chapel that stood at the north end of the square was demolished in 1953.

The 1965 TV special The Incredible World of James Bond filmed at Markham Square for fictional secret agent James Bond's flat.

In 2008, the square was the scene of a police siege after a resident (Mark Saunders, a lawyer) opened fire with a shotgun from a kitchen window. After a five-hour standoff, the gunman was shot dead by police.
