= Saleh al-Somali =

Somali terrorist

- Born: Somalia
- Died: 8 December 2009; Khyber Pakhtunkhwa, Pakistan
- Occupation: Alleged al Qaida operational planner
- Known for: Killed by a missile strike

Saleh al-Somali, born Abdirizaq Abdi Saleh, was described as being an al-Qaeda leader and the group's head of external operations. He was killed by a missile fired from an unmanned predator drone on 8 December 2009. The missile strike was on a suspect compound in Janikhel village near Pakistan's Federally Administered Tribal Areas, today a part of the Khyber Pakhtunkhwa.

Initially the identity of the senior al Qaida leader reported killed was not made public. But on 11 December 2009 ABC News quoted a US security official who said: "There are strong indications that senior al Qaeda operations planner Saleh al-Somali has been killed".
