= 2009 New York City Subway and United Kingdom plot =

Foiled bombing plot

- Location: United States, United Kingdom
- Attack type: Planned suicide bombings
- Convicted: Najibullah Zazi, Mohammed Wali Zazi, Imam Ahmad Wais Afzali, Zarein Ahmedzay, Adis Medunjanin

The 2009 New York City Subway and United Kingdom plot was a plan to bomb the New York City Subway as well as a target in the United Kingdom.

In September 2009, several individuals fell under suspicion and were arrested due to fears that a suspected jihadist cell in New York was planning to explode bombs in the United States. According to a July 2010 indictment, the cell had members in London plotting to carry out a companion bombing in the United Kingdom. Information gathered during the interrogation of one of the men triggered a nationwide bomb alert. Officials were told to be on alert for individuals with burns on their hands that might be chemical burns. They were told to be on alert for apartments with bad smells, or with multiple window fans.

== Participants ==
Najibullah Zazi, his father Mohammed Wali Zazi (born 1955 in Afghanistan), and Imam Ahmad Wais Afzali (born 1987) were arrested on 19 September 2009, for lying in a matter involving terrorism. All three men were long-time legal residents of the US, born in Afghanistan. According to the Chicago Tribune, American security officials suspected up to 12 individuals.

The central figure in the United States wing of the group was 24-year-old Zazi, said by the FBI to have been trained in the use of weapons and explosives at an Al Qaeda training camp in Pakistan in 2008. Zazi had initially said that trips he made to Pakistan in 2007 and 2008 were to visit his wife. His last trip lasted five months. Zazi acknowledged receiving weapons and explosives training in Pakistan's semi-autonomous Federally Administered Tribal Areas. The FBI found images of hand-written notes on how to build bombs on Zazi's laptop. Zazi said he was unaware of these notes, and speculated that he might have downloaded them accidentally with a religious book he had downloaded in August. The FBI found Zazi's fingerprints on a scale and on batteries found in a house in Queens they raided after his visit.

In 2009, Zazi was living in Colorado, and got a license to work as an airport shuttle driver. Previously he had lived in Queens, New York City, where he was eventually declared bankrupt. Zazi had been under surveillance for some time, prior to renting a car for a trip to New York on 9 September 2009.

On 9 January 2010, two more men were arrested in connection to the bomb plot. Taxi driver Zarein Ahmedzay and Bosnian immigrant Adis Medunjanin were charged with making false statements to the police, and pleaded not guilty. Medunjanin was arrested after his car crashed on the Whitestone Bridge on 7 January in New York City. The July indictment, noting Medunjanin called an operator and said "We love death", alleged that the crash was intentional and part of a suicide attack.

Mohammed Zazi was charged on the counts of conspiracy to obstruct justice, as well as conspiring to dispose of his son's bomb-making materials and chemicals. Based on a request of the Denver Joint Terrorism Task Force (JTTF), an arrest warrant for his arrest in violation of 18 U.S.C. §1001(a)(2) was issued on September 19, 2009. He was released on a $50,000 bail on February 18, 2009. He pleaded not guilty in February 2010. He was convicted in July 2011 of destroying evidence and lying to investigators. He was sentenced in February 2012 to four and a half years in prison. In October 2011, he pleaded guilty to instructing his lawyer to falsify immigration documents for his nephew.

Afzali was arrested on September 19, 2009, on "charges of lying in a matter involving terrorism.", citing that during his September 11, 2009, conversation, he warned Zazi that the police had come asking questions about him, and then lied to the FBI about having done so in two subsequent interrogations. He also said that the call was being monitored. Afzali was represented by human rights lawyer Ron Kuby. He was released on secured bail of $1.5 million. On March 4, 2010, in a plea bargain Afzali pleaded guilty to a reduced charge of lying to US federal agents, and said he was sorry. He faced up to six months in prison, and as part of the plea arrangement the government agreed not to request any jail time. Brooklyn federal judge Frederic Block sentenced Afzali on April 15, 2010. Afzali voluntarily left the US on 5 July, within 90 days of his sentencing. As a felon and under the agreement of his plea deal, he is not allowed to return to the US except by special permission. Most of Afzali's family remains in the United States. According to his lawyer, Afzali's last words in the United States were "God Bless America". Afzali denied ever having intended to aid Zazi or deceive American authorities.

== Other persons of interest ==
Another man who was questioned was Naiz Khan, who attended the same mosque as Najibullah Zazi when he lived in New York. A U-Haul dealership in Queens had contacted authorities to tell them that it had recently declined to rent a van to three suspicious men whose credit cards had been declined and wanted to pay cash. Naiz Khan was questioned about the failed rental, but denied he had ever been to the U-haul dealership. Khan's apartment was one of those that had been searched because Zazi was believed to have stayed there. According to The New York Times, Zazi had shared an apartment with Khan, Amanullah Akbari, and three other men, when he lived in New York a year earlier.

On 7 July 2010, five al Qaeda members were indicted in relation to the alleged plot. Abid Naseer and Tariq Ur Rehman were charged with involvement in a companion plot in the United Kingdom. Naseer was already in custody after his arrest for sending e-mails to an al-Qaeda operative in Pakistan that were reported to be at the heart of a plot to bomb targets in north-west England. On 3 January 2013, Abid Naseer was extradited from the UK to the US. On 4 March 2015, Naseer was found guilty by a Brooklyn court of plotting bomb attacks in the US and of plotting to blow up the Manchester Arndale in the UK. Most of the evidence in his trial consisted of email exchanges between Naseer and an al-Qaeda handler who was directing plots to attack civilians in Manchester, New York City and Copenhagen. It was the first terrorist trial to include documents recovered during the 2009 Navy Seal raid against Osama bin Laden’s compound.

Adnan Shukrijumah, reported to be charge of planning Al Qaeda attacks worldwide, was charged with plotting and recruiting members for the New York attack. Over four years later, in December 2014, Shukrijumah was killed in a Pakistani manhunt operation.

In the wake of NSA worker Edward Snowden's surveillance disclosures, the US government argued NSA spying helped foil the subway plot by tracking communications between Zazi and a bombmaker in Pakistan.
