= Iraq =

Country in West Asia

Republic of Iraq: جُمْهُورِيَّة ٱلْعِرَاق (Arabic) Jumhūriyyat al-ʿIrāq; کۆماری عێراق (Kurdish) Komarî Êraq
- Flag Coat of arms
- Anthem: مَوْطِنِيْ Mawṭinī "My Homeland"
- Capital and largest city: Baghdad; 33°20′N 44°23′E; Country: 33°N 44°E
- Official languages: Arabic; Kurdish
- Recognised regional languages: Assyrian; Western Armenian; Turkmen (Note: Although referred to as Turkmen, the official written language of the Turkmen is Istanbul Turkish.)
- Ethnic groups (1987): 75–80% Arabs; 15–20% Kurds; 5–10% Assyrians, Turkmen, Jews, Persians, Yazidis, Mandaeans, and others
- Religion (2020): 90–95% Islam (official); 61% Shia; 35% Sunni; 5-10% other religions (incl. Christians, Mandeans, Yazidis) (Note: Christianity, Mandaeism, Yazidism, Judaism, Yarsanism, irreligion and others)
- Demonym: Iraqi
- Government: Federal parliamentary republic under confessionalism
  - President: Nizar Amidi
  - Prime Minister: Ali al-Zaidi
  - Speaker: Haibat al-Halbousi
- Legislature: Council of Representatives
  - Upper house: Federation Council (Note: The Federation Council is envisioned by article 65 of the constitution as an upper house but has never convened, meaning the legislature de-facto practices as a unicameral system solely under the Council of Representatives.)
  - Lower house: Council of Representatives

Establishment
  - Sumer: c. 3300 BC
  - Akkadian Empire: c. 2334 BC
  - Assyria: c. 2025 BC
  - Babylonia: c. 1890 BC
  - Abbasid Caliphate: 750 AD
  - Mamluk Iraq: 1704 AD
  - Mandate of Mesopotamia: 14 April 1920
  - Independence declared: 3 October 1932
  - Republic declared: 14 July 1958
  - Current constitution: 15 October 2005

Area
  - Total: 438,317 km^{2} (169,235 sq mi) (58th)
  - Water (%): 4.93 (as of 2024)

Population
  - 2024 census: ▲46,118,793 (34th)
  - Density: 82.7/km^{2} (214.2/sq mi) (125th)
- GDP (PPP): 2026 estimate
  - Total: ▼$606.636 billion (48th)
  - Per capita: ▼$13,007 (110th)
- GDP (nominal): 2026 estimate
  - Total: ▼$245.234 billion (54th)
  - Per capita: ▼$5,258 (112th)
- Gini (2012): 29.5 low inequality
- HDI (2024): ▲0.712 high (122nd)
- Currency: Iraqi dinar (IQD)
- Time zone: UTC+3 (AST)
- Calling code: +964
- Internet TLD: .iq; .العراق

Iraq, (Note: Arabic: ٱلْعِرَاق, romanised: al-ʿIrāq, IPA: [lʕi.raːq]; Kurdish: عێراق, romanised: Êraq, IPA: [ʕe̞ː.ɾaːq]; Syriac: ܥܝܪܐܩ, romanised: ʿĪrāq, IPA: [ʕiːˈraːq]; Western Armenian: Իրաք, romanised: Irak, IPA: [iɾɑkʰ]; Turkmen: Yrak, IPA: [jɯˈɾɑk]) officially the Republic of Iraq, (Note: Arabic: جُمْهُورِيَّة ٱلْعِرَاق, romanised: Jumhūriyyat al-ʿIrāq [d͡ʒʊmhuːˈrɪj.jat elʕɪˈraːq]; Kurdish: کۆماری عێراق, romanised: Komarî Êraq, [komɑːri ʕeːrɑːq]; Syriac: ܩܘܛܢܝܘܬܐ ܕܥܝܪܐܩ, romanised: Quṭnāyūṯā d-ʿĪrāq, [qʊtˤ.naːˈjuː.θaː d‿ʕiːˈraːq]; Western Armenian: Իրաքի Հանրապետություն, romanized: Iraki Hanrabedutyun, [iɾɑˈkʰi hɑnɾɑbɛdutyun]; Turkmen: Yrak Respublikasy, [jɯˈɾɑk ɾespʊbliˈkɑsɯ]) is a country in West Asia. Located within the Middle East, it is bordered by Saudi Arabia to the south, Turkey to the north, Iran to the east, the Persian Gulf and Kuwait to the southeast, Jordan to the southwest, and Syria to the west. The country covers an area of 438,317 square kilometres (169,235 sq mi) and has a population of over 46 million, making it the 58th largest country by area and the 31st most populous in the world. Baghdad, home to over 8 million people, is the capital city and the largest in the country.

Starting in the 6th millennium BC, the fertile plains between Iraq's Tigris and Euphrates rivers, referred to as Mesopotamia, fostered the rise of early cities, civilisations, and empires including Sumer, Akkad, Babylonia, and Assyria. Known as the cradle of civilisation, inhabitants of Mesopotamia contributed to the earliest history of astrology, mathematics, navigation, timekeeping, writing systems, the wheel, the sailboat, a calendar, and a law code. After the Arab conquest of Mesopotamia in the 7th century, Iraq became the metropole of the Abbasid Caliphate with Baghdad emerging as a global cultural and intellectual hub during the Islamic Golden Age, home to institutions such as the House of Wisdom. Following Baghdad's destruction by the Mongols in 1258, Iraq came under successive empires, and from the 16th until the 20th century, it was governed within the Ottoman system as a defined region known administratively as Ottoman Iraq.

Since independence in 1932 after the defeat of the Ottoman Empire in World War I, Iraq has experienced spells of significant economic and military growth alongside periods of instability and conflict. Iraq emerged as a hashemite monarchy after centuries of Ottoman rule and a period under British administration. In 1958, a military coup led by Abdul Karim Qasim overthrew the monarchy and established a republic. Later, the Ba'ath Party took power in 1968, establishing a one-party state under Ahmed Hassan al-Bakr and later Saddam Hussein, who presided over war against Iran from 1980 to 1988 and then invaded Kuwait in 1990. In 2003, U.S.-led coalition forces invaded and occupied Iraq, overthrowing the government and triggering an insurgency and sectarian violence during the Iraq War, which ended in 2011. From 2013 to 2017, Iraq faced another major conflict with the rise and defeat of the Islamic State. Today post-war conflict continues at a lower scale, hampering stability alongside the influence of Iran. However, recently Iraq has begun to rein in Iranian influence and advance its own state authority.

A federal parliamentary republic, Iraq is considered an emerging middle power. It is home to a diverse population, geography and wildlife. Most Iraqis are Muslims, while significant religious minorities include Christians, Jews, Mandaeans, Yarsanis, and Yazidis. Iraqis are ethnically diverse; mostly Iraqi Arabs, as well as Kurds, Turkmens, Yazidis, Assyrians, Armenians, Doms, and Shabaks. Arabic and Kurdish are the official languages of Iraq, while Assyrian (Suret), Turkmen and Mandaic are spoken regionally. Iraq, home to one of the largest oil reserves in the world, has a significant oil and gas industry. It is also popular for its agriculture and tourism. At present, Iraq is in the process of reconstruction.

== Etymology ==
There are several suggested origins for the name. One dates to the Sumerian city of Uruk and is thus ultimately of Sumerian origin. Another possible etymology for the name is from the Middle Persian word erāg, meaning "lowlands". An Arabic folk etymology for the name is "deeply rooted, well-watered; fertile".

The name al-ʿIrāq is attested as a common toponym in pre-Islamic Arabic poetry. The sixth-century poet Adi ibn Zayd, from the Lakhmid court at al-Ḥirah, used the name in a demographic context, speaking of the "people of Iraq" (ahl al-ʿIrāq), and in a geographical sense, referring to the "central area of Iraq" (ṣaḥn al-ʿIrāq). His contemporary, Imruʾ al-Qais, used the name in social contexts, mentioning "the abundant food of Iraq" (ṭaʿām al-ʿIrāq al-mustafīḍ) and "the patterned fabric of Iraq" (ḥawkk al-ʿIrāq al-munammaq), and in a political context, stating "his kingdom stretches from Iraq to Oman" (lahu mulk al-ʿIrāq ilā ʿUmān). This usage continued into the early Islamic period. The tenth-century geographer al-Maqdisi, defending his use of "Iraq" instead of the ancient name "Babylonia", noted that it was the only name used in his time. He cited the precedent Abu Bakr, who reportedly said, "For Allah to grant a victory, even a handspan, of the Holy Land by my hand is more beloved to me than a district from the districts of Iraq" (rustāq min rasātīq al-ʿIrāq), and al-Maqdisi specifically pointed out that Abu Bakr did not say "Babylonia".

During the medieval period, there was a region called ʿIrāq ʿArabī ("Arabian Iraq") for Mesopotamia and ʿIrāq ʿAjamī ("Persian Iraq"), for the region now situated in Central and Western Iran. According to some historians, the term historically included the plain south of the Hamrin Mountains and did not include the northernmost and westernmost parts of the modern territory of Iraq. However, contemporary medieval definitions of Iraq's extent varied. The 13th-century geographer Yaqut al-Hamawi, for example, defined Iraq as stretching "from Mosul to Abadan in length, and from Al-Qadisiyyah to Halwan in width". Prior to the middle of the 19th century, the term Eyraca Arabica was commonly used to describe Iraq. The term Sawad was also used in early Islamic times for the region of the alluvial plain of the Tigris and Euphrates rivers.

As an Arabic word, عراق ʿirāq means "hem", "shore", "bank", or "edge", so that the name by folk etymology came to be interpreted as "the escarpment", such as at the south and east of the Jazira Plateau, which forms the northern and western edge of the "al-Iraq arabi" area. The Arabic pronunciation is [ʕiˈrɑːq]. In English, it is either /ɪˈrɑːk/ (the only pronunciation listed in the Oxford English Dictionary and the first one in Merriam-Webster's Online Dictionary) or /ɪˈræk/ (listed first by MQD, the American Heritage Dictionary, and the Random House Dictionary.)

When the British established the Hashemite king on 23 August 1921, Faisal I of Iraq, the official English name of the country changed from Mesopotamia to the endonymic Iraq. Since January 1992, the official name of the state is "Republic of Iraq" (Jumhūriyyat al-ʿIrāq), reaffirmed in the 2005 Constitution.

== History ==
Iraq largely coincides with the ancient region of Mesopotamia, often referred to as the cradle of civilisation. The history of Mesopotamia extends back to the Lower Paleolithic period, with significant developments continuing through the establishment of the Caliphate in the late 7th century AD, after which the region became known as Iraq.

=== Bronze and Iron Age ===
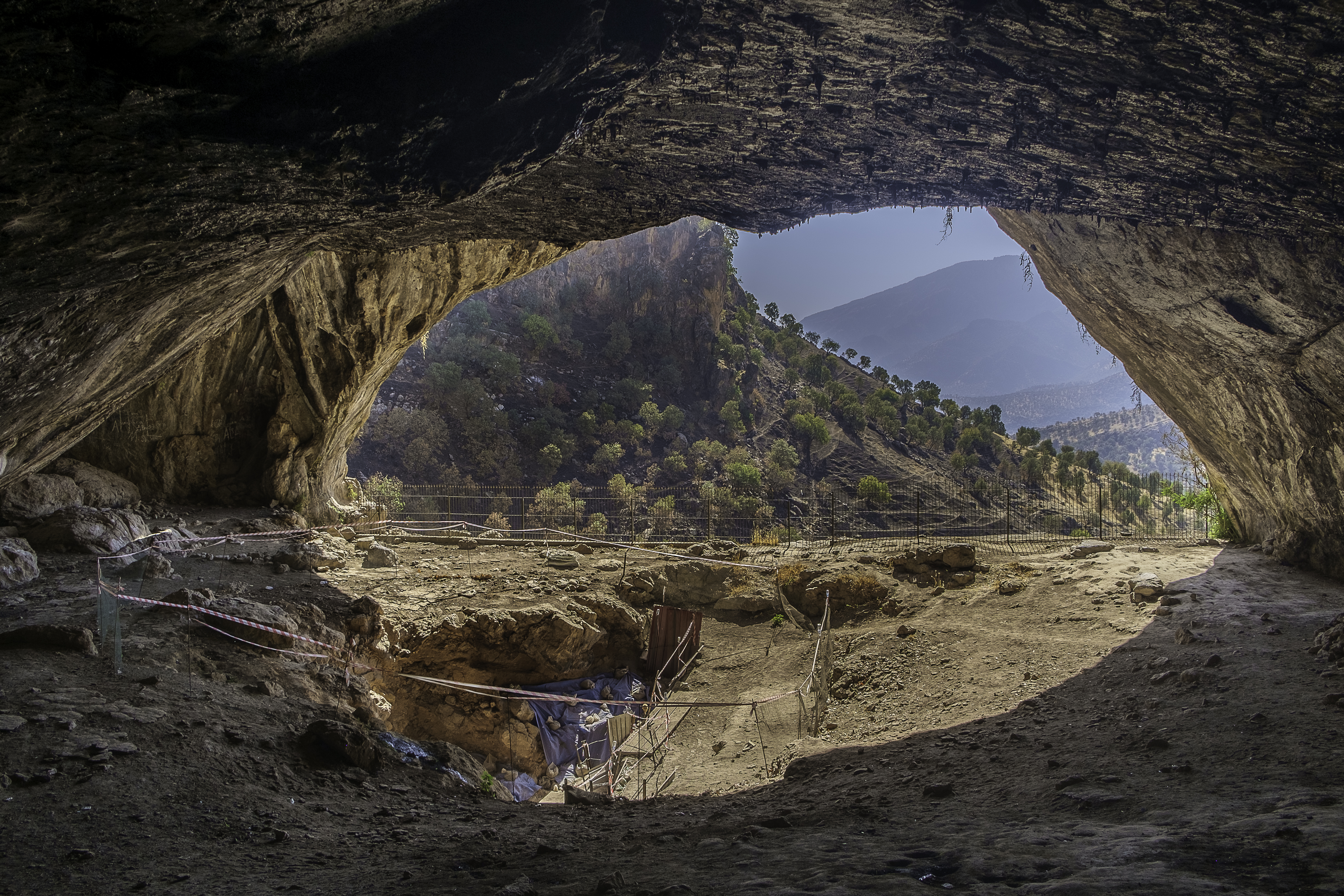
The Shanidar Cave, where the remains of eight adult and two infant Neanderthals, dating from around 65,000–35,000 years ago were found

Within its borders lies the ancient land of Sumer, which emerged between 6000 and 5000 BC during the Neolithic Ubaid period. Sumer is recognised as the world's earliest civilisation, marking the beginning of urban development, written language, and monumental architecture. Sumer also had advanced canal systems. Iraq's territory also includes the heartlands of the Akkadian, Neo-Sumerian, Babylonian, Neo-Assyrian, and Neo-Babylonian empires, which dominated Mesopotamia and much of the Ancient Near East during the Bronze and Iron Ages.

=== Antiquity ===
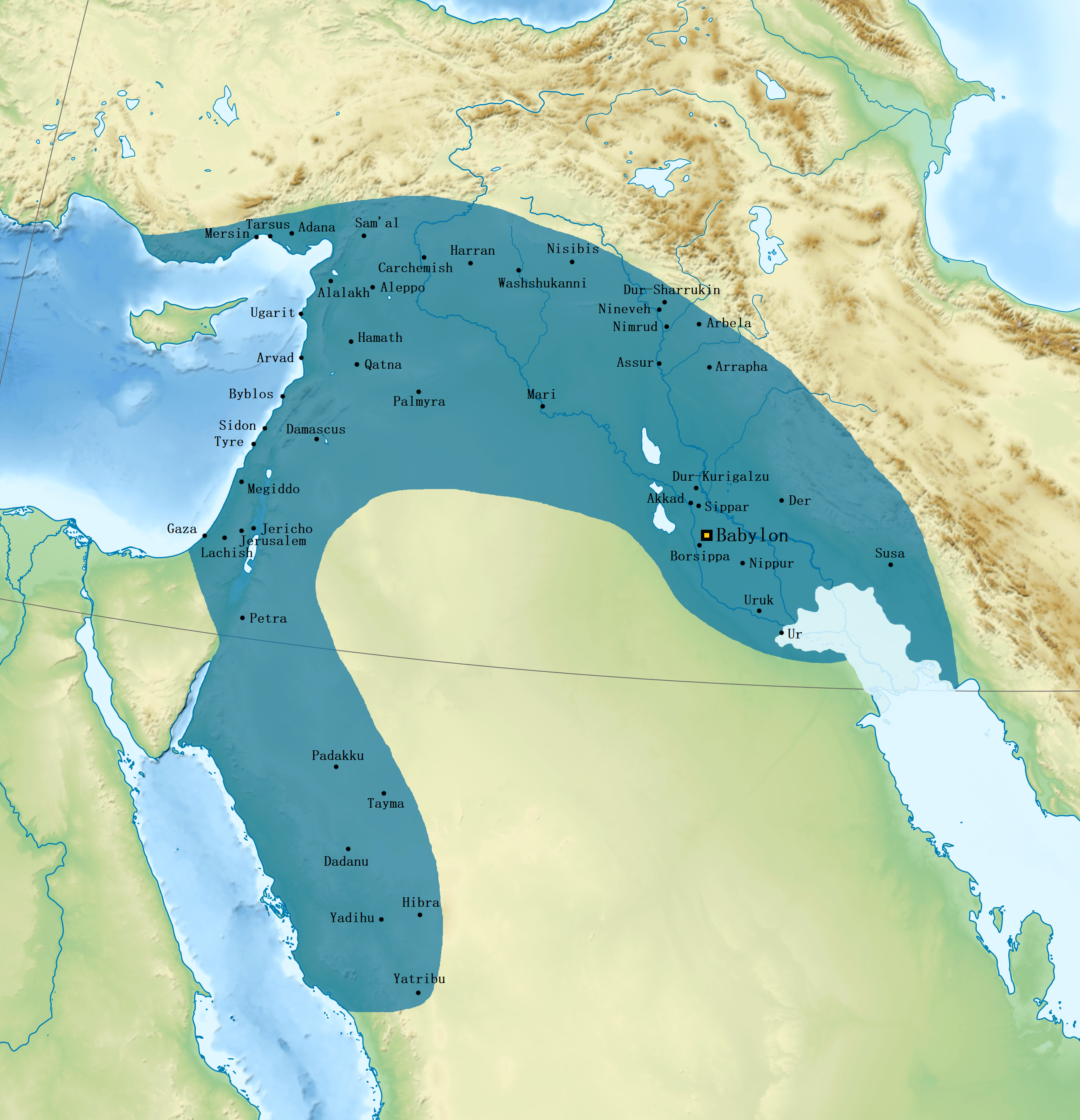
The Neo-Babylonian Empire under Nabonidus (r. 556–539 BC) at its greatest territorial extent

Following the Achaemenid conquest of Babylon in 539 BCE, Mesopotamia remained a core region of the Achaemenid Empire, with its existing population and local institutions continuing in use. Maintaining Mesopotamian royal tradition, Cyrus the Great adopted titles such as King of Babylon, King of Sumer and Akkad, and King of the Four Corners, while continuing the Assyrian-derived imperial title King of Kings, which remained in use into late antiquity. Babylon became an imperial capital of the empire, and Aramaic, long established in Mesopotamia, became the lingua franca of the empire for administration and interregional communication.

After Mesopotamia came under Macedonian control following Alexander the Great's campaign in 331 BCE, Babylon surrendered without resistance. Alexander intended to make Babylon the capital of his empire, but this plan was abandoned after his death in 323 BCE, with Seleucia established as the imperial capital in Mesopotamia. Following the founding of Seleucia, the population of Babylon was resettled to it. Under Seleucid rule, administrative and economic power remained centered in Mesopotamia. Babylonian economic traditions persisted during this period, including the continued use of the silver shekel. Babylonian chronicle fragments record Seleucid rulers engaging with local institutions, while temple authorities, scholarly traditions, and cuneiform writing continued to function during the Seleucid period. Archaeological evidence from Uruk indicates that Babylonian religious institutions and architectural traditions continued to function during this period. In Babylonian contexts, Seleucid rulers were described as kings in Babylonia.

In late antiquity, Mesopotamia formed part of the decentralized Parthian Empire, which contained numerous semi-autonomous kingdoms and maintained Aramaic as a lingua franca alongside Mesopotamian religious traditions. During the Parthian and Sasanian periods, Ctesiphon gradually merged with Seleucia to form a cosmopolitan metropolis that served as the Sasanian capital, later known as al-Madāʾin. Under Sasanian rule this territory was organized as the province of Āsōristān, corresponding to the geography of Babylonia which Arabic-writing geographers referred to as al-ʿIrāq, a regional designation that continued into the Islamic period.

The capitals of Iranic empires shifted toward Mesopotamia, from Susa to Ctesiphon. The Iranic state came to be dependent on the Iraqi Sawad for its state revenues and centralized administration. When the Sasanians lost the Mesopotamian capital at Ctesiphon during the Arab conquests, Sasanian rule came to an end. Following the conquest, Iraq emerged as politically and culturally distinct from Syria, a division noted by Byzantine authors such as Theophanes, who referred to their inhabitants respectively as "Herakites" and "Isamites".

=== Middle Ages ===
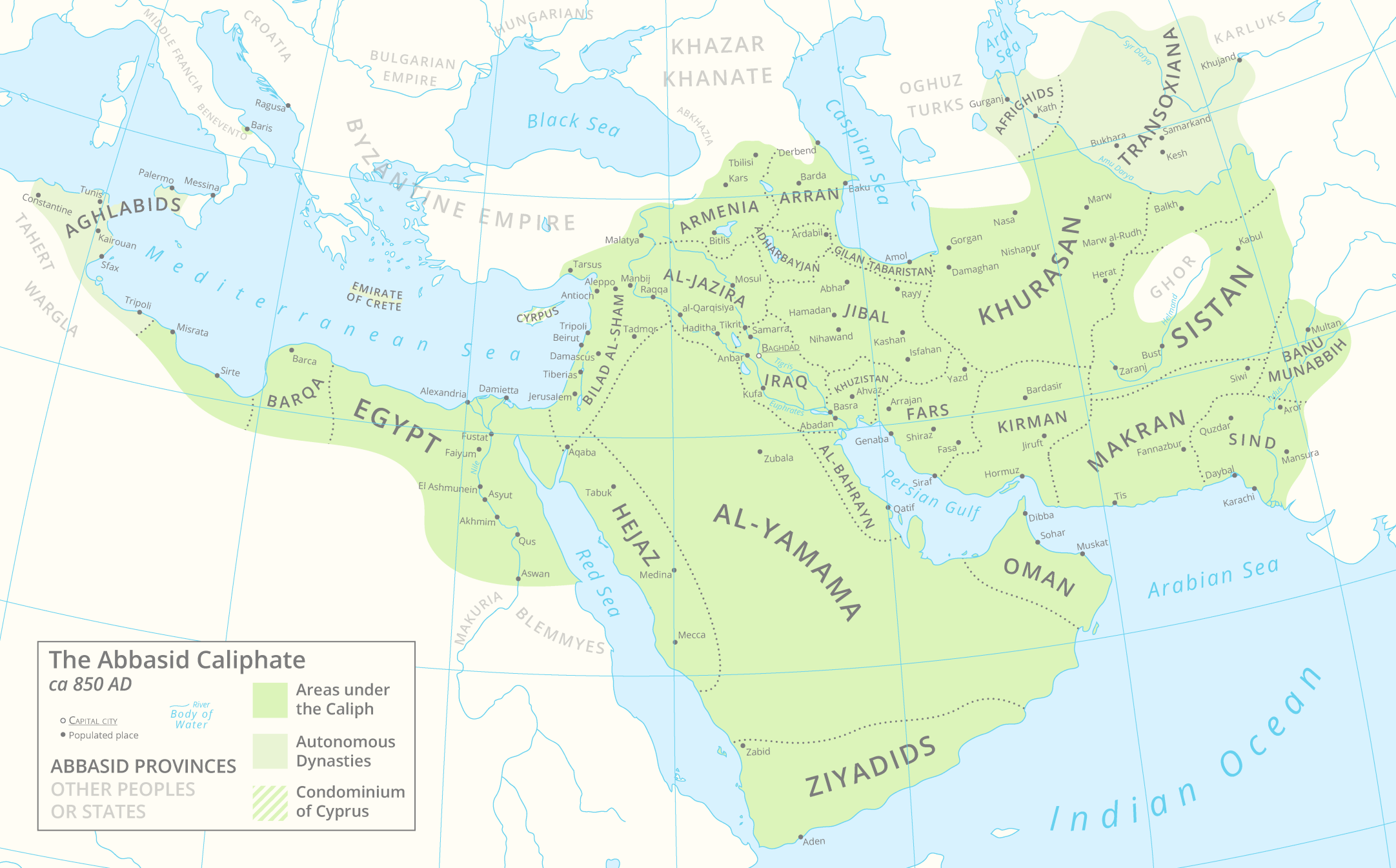
Abbasid Caliphate with capitals in Baghdad and Samarra c. 850

In the decades after the conquest, the Rashidun caliph Ali ibn Abi Talib strengthened Iraq's political importance by transferring the seat of the caliphate from Medina to Kufa. Under Umayyad rule, the governor of Iraq frequently exercised authority over much of the empire's eastern provinces. After the Battle of Karbala in 680, Iraq became the primary locus of Alid political opposition, a legacy that the Abbasid Caliphate later mobilized when establishing their rule from Iraq.

Iraq was the metropole of the Abbasid Caliphate even before Baghdad was founded, and following earlier Mesopotamian precedents, Abbasid rulers spent large sums on restoring and extending canal systems and cultivating land. With the founding of Baghdad in 762, Iraq became the political, economic, and intellectual core during the Islamic Golden Age, housing institutions such as the House of Wisdom. Abbasid Iraq generated the highest state revenues of the caliphate, reaching four times that of Egypt, the second richest province, drawing largely on the agricultural productivity of southern Iraq. During this period, large quantities of opaque glazed pottery were produced in Iraq and exported as mass-produced commercial goods across the Indian Ocean. Abbasid literary culture in Iraq reflected long-term Mesopotamian narrative continuities, appearing across Muslim and Jewish texts despite religious and political change. In his court narratives, al-Masʿūdī presents Iraq as a distinct regional point of comparison, including contrasts between Iraqi and Syrian officials in matters of administration, accounts in which the people of Iraq are cited as rejecting Egyptian claims of environmental advantage, and anecdotes in which legal practice in Mecca is discussed in terms of how it would be ridiculed by the Iraqis.

From the tenth century onward, Iraq entered a period of political fragmentation as effective power shifted from the Abbasid caliphs to regional dynasties. Authority within Iraq was exercised by a succession of local dynasties, including the Hamdanids, Buyids, Uqaylids, and Mazyadids, which competed and negotiated for control of Iraqi cities and territories. During this period, regional rulers exercised authority in Iraq while receiving formal recognition from the Abbasid caliphs in Baghdad. This period of decentralized rule in Iraq ended with the rise of the Seljuk Empire, whose capture of Baghdad in 1055 ended Buyid dominance and left the Abbasid caliphs as largely ceremonial figures under Seljuk rule.

The existing pattern of regional rule in Iraq was disrupted by the Mongol conquest in the thirteenth century. In 1258, Mongol forces captured and sacked Baghdad, bringing Abbasid political rule in Iraq to an end and causing widespread destruction. Iraq was subsequently incorporated into the Ilkhanate as a territorial province within the Mongol Empire. Under Ilkhanid rule, elements of agricultural production and urban life in Iraq gradually recovered, and Iraq remained a populated and economically active region into the late medieval period.

After the collapse of Mongol rule in the 14th century, Iraq came under the control of the Jalayirids, a dynasty of Mongol origin that ruled from Baghdad following the breakup of the Ilkhanate. Their authority was eventually replaced by the Qara Qoyunlu, a Turkoman confederation that captured Baghdad in the early 15th century and extended its rule over much of Iraq. In the later 15th century, the Aq Qoyunlu defeated the Qara Qoyunlu and established control over Iraq as part of a wider regional empire. This period of Turkmen rule ended in 1508 when Shah Ismail I conquered Baghdad and incorporated Iraq into the Safavid Empire.

=== Early Modern Period ===
Iraq was conquered by Sultan Suleiman I in 1534 and became part of the Ottoman Empire. During the 16th and 17th centuries, Iraq was a major frontier of the Ottoman–Safavid wars, with Baghdad changing hands several times until the Treaty of Zuhab in 1639 confirmed Ottoman control. Administratively, Iraq was organised into the provinces of Baghdad, Basra, Mosul, and Shahrizor, which the Ottomans collectively referred to as Hıtta-i Irakiyye ("the Iraq region").

From 1749 to 1831, Iraq was ruled by a Mamluk dynasty of Georgian origin with considerable autonomy while maintaining nominal allegiance to the Ottoman sultan. After the dynasty was overthrown in 1831, the centralisation of Iraq under Baghdad began. Under the two-time Ottoman Viceroy, Namık Pasha, Baghdad's authority was expanded through military and administrative reforms. Midhat Pasha introduced further reforms in taxation, land registration, infrastructure, education, and communications, reforms often seen as laying the groundwork for the modern Iraq.

Iraq remained under Ottoman control until the First World War, when the British launched the Mesopotamian campaign. The campaign led to the occupation of Baghdad in 1917, and in 1920 Ottoman Iraq was formally dissolved with the establishment of the British Mandate of Mesopotamia.

=== Modern Iraq ===
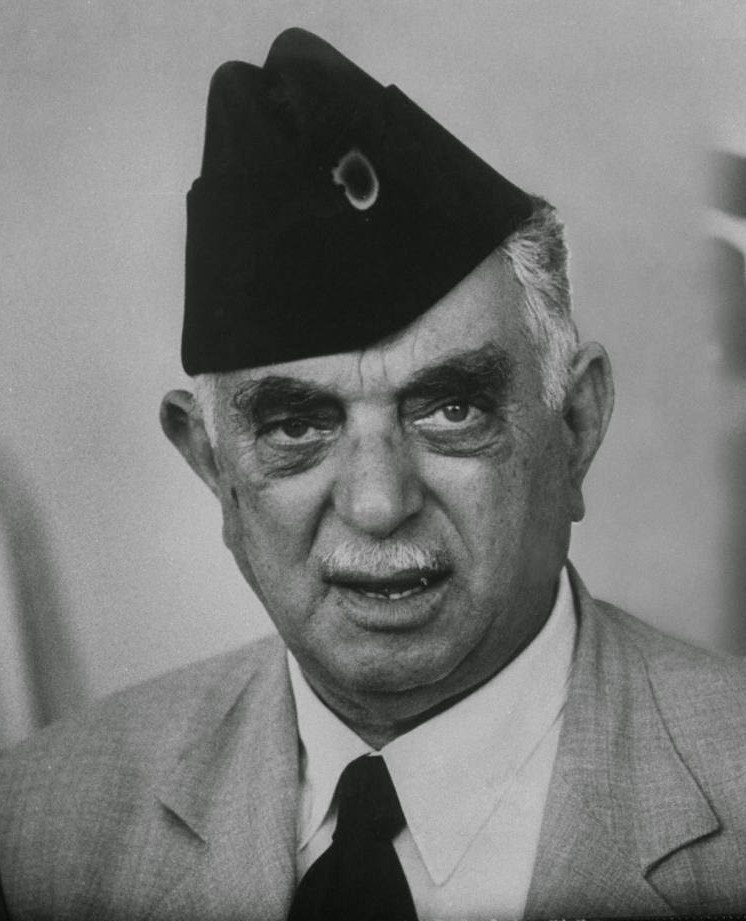
Nuri Pasha al-Said (1888–1958) served eight terms as prime minister during Mandatory Iraq and the Hashemite Kingdom

Iraq's modern history began in the wake of World War I, as the region emerged from the collapse of the Ottoman Empire. Arab forces, inspired by the promise of independence, had helped dismantle the Ottoman hold on the Middle East, but the dream of a united, sovereign Arab state was soon dashed. Despite agreements made with Hussein bin Ali, the Sharif of Makkah, the European powers had different plans for the region. Following the British withdrawal of support for a unified Arab state, Hussein's son, Faisal, briefly declared the Kingdom of Syria in 1920, encompassing parts of what are now Lebanon, Palestine, Jordan, and Syria. However, the kingdom was short-lived, crushed by local opposition and the military might of France, which had been granted a mandate over Syria.

The British unified three former Ottoman provinces—Mosul, Baghdad, and Basra—into the Mandate of Mesopotamia, which became Iraq. Under the British, tensions were rising as locals increasingly resisted foreign control. An anti-British rebellion erupted across the country, beginning with Baghdad. The British military responded by air bombing across the capital, where thousands of residents were killed. The need of a new strategy became clear. In 1921, the Cairo Conference, led by British officials including Winston Churchill and T.E. Lawrence, decided that Faisal, now exiled in London, would become the king of Iraq. The decision was seen as a way to maintain British influence in the region while placating local demands for leadership. Upon his coronation as king, Faisal focused on laying foundation of Iraq. He worked hard to gain support of Iraq's diverse population and paid special attention to the Shi'a community, symbolically choosing the date of his coronation to coincide with Eid al-Ghadeer, a key day for Shiite Muslims.

His reign laid the foundations of modern Iraq. Faisal worked to establish key state institutions and fostered a sense of national identity. His education reforms included the founding of Ahl al-Bayt University in Baghdad, and he encouraged the migration of Syrian exiles to Iraq to serve as doctors and educators. Faisal also envisioned infrastructural links between Iraq, Syria, and Jordan, including plans for a railway and an oil pipeline to the Mediterranean. Although Faisal succeeded in securing greater autonomy for Iraq, British influence remained strong, particularly in the country's oil industry. In 1930, Iraq signed a treaty with Britain that gave the country a measure of political independence while maintaining British control over key aspects, including military presence and oil rights. By 1932, Iraq gained formal independence, becoming a member of the League of Nations. Faisal's reign was marked by his efforts to balance the pressures of external influence and internal demands for sovereignty. He was admired for his diplomatic skill and his commitment to steering Iraq towards self-determination. Untimely, he died from a heart attack on 8 September 1933, leaving his son Ghazi to inherit the throne. King Ghazi's reign was brief and turbulent, as Iraq was impacted by numerous coup attempts. He died in a motor vehicle accident in 1939, passing the throne to his young son, Faisal II, who ascended to the throne at just 3 years old. Faisal II's uncle, Crown Prince Abdullah, assumed regency until the young king came of age.

On 1 April 1941, Rashid Ali al-Gaylani and members of the Golden Square staged a coup d'état and installed a pro-German and pro-Italian government. During the subsequent Anglo-Iraqi War, the United Kingdom invaded Iraq for fear that the government might cut oil supplies to Western nations because of its links to the Axis powers. The war started on 2 May, and the British, together with loyal Assyrian Levies, defeated the forces of Al-Gaylani, forcing an armistice on 31 May. Regency of King Faisal II ended on 2 May 1953, his 18th birthday, upon which he gained his majority. The hopes for Iraq's future under Faisal II were high, but the nation remained divided. Iraq's Sunni-dominated monarchy struggled to reconcile the diverse ethnic and religious groups, particularly the Shiite, Assyrian, Jewish and Kurdish populations, who felt marginalised. In 1958, these tensions culminated in a military coup, inspired by the revolutionary wave sweeping across the Arab world, particularly the 1952 Egyptian revolution.

=== Republic and Ba'athist Iraq ===
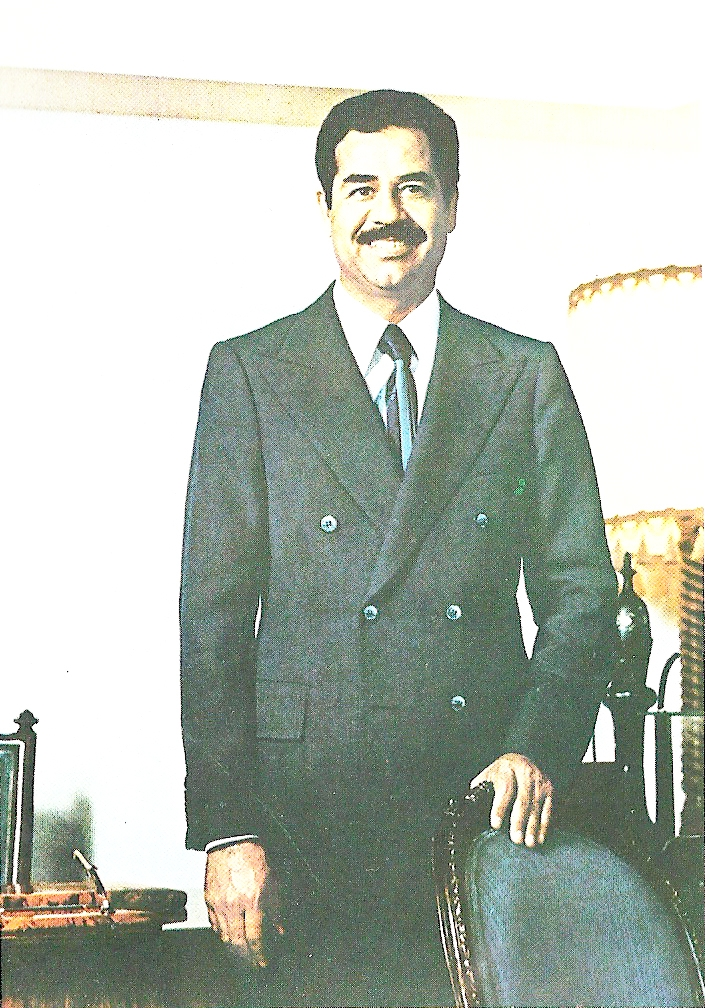
Saddam Hussein in 1980

Brigadier General and nationalist Abd al-Karim Qasim led a coup d'état known as the 14 July Revolution in 1958. This revolt was strongly anti-imperial and anti-monarchical in nature and had strong socialist elements. King Faisal II, Prince Abd al-Ilah, and Nuri al-Sa'id, along with the royal family were killed brutally. Qasim controlled Iraq through military rule and in 1958 he began a process of forcibly reducing surplus land owned by a few citizens and having the state redistribute the land. In 1959, Abd al-Wahab al-Shawaf led an uprising in Mosul against Qasim. The uprising was crushed by the government forces. Qasim claimed Kuwait as part of Iraq, when the former was granted independence in 1961. The United Kingdom deployed its army on the Iraq–Kuwait border, which forced Qasim to back down. He was overthrown by the Ba'ath Party in a February 1963 coup. However internal division within Ba'athist factions caused another coup in November, which brought Colonel Abdul Salam Arif to power. The new regime recognised Kuwait's independence. After the latter's death in 1966, he was succeeded by his brother, Abdul Rahman Arif. Under his rule, Iraq participated in the Six-Day War in 1967.

The 17 July Revolution overthrew Arif and brought the Iraqi Ba'ath Party to power in 1968, with Ahmed Hassan al-Bakr as the president of Iraq. However, the government gradually came under the control of Saddam Hussein, Iraq's then vice-president. Saddam sought to achieve stability between Iraq's ethnic and religious groups. The first Iraqi–Kurdish war ended in 1970, after which a peace treaty was signed between Saddam and Barzani, granting autonomy to Kurds. In the 1970s, the leadership offered peace initiatives to Assyrians in Iraq and invited exiled Iraqi Jews back to Iraq. The government introduced free healthcare and education, nationalised oil, promoted women's rights and developed infrastructure.

In 1974, the second Iraqi–Kurdish war began and border clashes with Iran took place on Shatt al-Arab. Iran supported Kurdish militants. The Algiers Agreement signed in 1975 by Mohammad Reza Pahlavi and Saddam resolved the dispute and Iran withdrew support for the Kurds, resulting in their defeat in the war. In 1973, Iraq participated in the Yom Kippur War against Israel, alongside Syria and Egypt. An attempt to ban an annual pilgrimage to Karbala in 1977 caused an uprising by Shia Muslims across Iraq. Another Shia uprising took place from 1979 to 1980, as a followup to the Islamic Revolution in Iran. On 16 July 1979, Saddam acceded to the presidency and chairmanship of the Revolutionary Command Council, Iraq's then supreme executive body.

Following months of cross-border raids with Iran, Saddam declared war on Iran in September 1980, initiating the Iran–Iraq War. Taking advantage of the post-Iranian Revolution chaos in Iran, Iraq captured some territories in southwest Iran, but Iran recaptured all of the lost territories within two years, and for the next six years Iran was on the offensive. Sunni-led Arab countries and the United States supported Iraq throughout the war. In 1981, Israel destroyed a nuclear reactor of Iraq. In midst of the war, between 1983 and 1986, Kurds led rebellion against the regime. In retaliation, the government-coordinated Anfal campaign led to the killing of 50,000–100,000 civilians. During the war, Saddam extensively used chemical weapons against Iranians. The war, which ended in stalemate in 1988, killed between half a million and 1.5 million people.

Kuwait's refusal to waive Iraq's debt and reducing oil prices pushed Saddam to take military action against it. On 2 August 1990, the Iraqi forces invaded and annexed Kuwait as its 19th governorate, starting the Gulf War. This led to military intervention by the US-led alliance. The coalition forces proceeded with a bombing campaign targeting military targets and then launched a 100-hour-long ground assault against Iraqi forces in southern Iraq and Kuwait. Iraq also attempted to invade Saudi Arabia and attacked Israel. Iraq's armed forces were devastated during the war. Sanctions were imposed on Iraq, following the invasion of Kuwait, which resulted in economic decline. After the end of the war in 1991, Iraqi Kurds and Shi'ite Muslims in northern and southern Iraq led several uprisings against Saddam's regime, but these were repressed. It is estimated that as many as 100,000 people, including many civilians, were killed. During the uprisings, the US, UK, Turkey and France, claiming authority under UNSC Resolution 688, established the Iraqi no-fly zones to protect Kurdish population from attacks and autonomy was given to Kurds. Iraq was also affected by the Iraqi Kurdish Civil War from 1994 to 1997. Around 40,000 fighters and civilians were killed. Between 2001 and 2003, the Kurdistan Regional Government and Ansar al-Islam engaged in conflict, which would merge with the upcoming war.

=== Post-invasion Iraq ===
After the 11 September 2001 attacks, U.S. President George W. Bush began planning the overthrow of Saddam in what is now widely regarded as a false pretense. Saddam's Iraq was included in Bush's "axis of evil". The US Congress passed a joint resolution, which authorised the use of armed force against Iraq. In November 2002 the UN Security Council passed resolution 1441. On 20 March 2003, the US-led coalition invaded Iraq, as part of the global war on terror. Within weeks, coalition forces occupied much of Iraq, with the Iraqi Army adopting guerrilla tactics to confront coalition forces. Following the fall of Baghdad in the first week of April, Saddam's regime had completely lost control of Iraq. A statue of Saddam was toppled in Baghdad, symbolising the end of his rule. The US-created Coalition Provisional Authority introduced the current political system of the country.

==== Insurgency and Civil war ====
The Coalition Provisional Authority disbanded the Iraqi military and expelled Ba'athists from the new government. The insurgents fought against the coalition forces and the newly installed government. Saddam was captured and executed. The Shia–Sunni civil war took place from 2006 to 2008. The coalition forces were accused of war crimes such as the Abu Ghraib torture, the Fallujah massacre, the Mahmudiyah rape and killings and the Mukaradeeb wedding party massacre. Following the withdrawal of US troops in 2011, the occupation ceased and war ended. The war in Iraq has resulted in between 151,000 and 1.2 million Iraqis being killed.

The subsequent efforts to rebuild the country amidst sectarian violence was galvanised by continuing discontent over Nouri al-Maliki's government, which led to protests. In 2013, taking advantage of the ensuing chaos and popular discontent against the Iraqi government, Ba'athist and other Sunni militants (Al Qaida and ISIS) launched a number of attacks against the government during what is known as the Anbar campaign. What followed, was a large scale offensive by ISIS in Mosul, which marked the beginning of the rapid territorial expansion of the group, initiating full-scale war in Iraq. Sunni insurgents belonging to the Islamic State group seized control of large swathes of land including several major cities, like Tikrit, Fallujah and Mosul, creating hundreds of thousands of internally displaced persons amid reports of atrocities by ISIS fighters. An estimated 500,000 civilians fled from Mosul. Around 5,000 Yazidis were killed in the genocide by ISIS, as a part of the war. In June 2014, Iraq's leading Shii Grand Ayatollah, Ali al-Sistani issued a Fatwa calling on able-bodied men to join the Armed Forces to fight against ISIS. Even though the Fatwa specifically instructed Iraqis to join the official Armed Forces of the country (such as the Army or the Police), it nevertheless resulted in the creation of the Popular Mobilisation Forces. During that time, the government of Iraq, headed by Haider al-Abadi requested the international community to assist Iraq against ISIS, resulting in the creation of the American-led Coalition against ISIS. Meanwhile, in an attempt to counter US influence, Khomeinist anti-US militias prompted Iranian intervention, which resulted in the latter expanding its influence. The Iraqi armed forces, supported by the US-led coalition, as well as the Popular Mobilisation Forces, Peshmerga and other allied anti-ISIS militias then initiated a counter-offensive to retake and liberate ISIS-held territory. In December 2017, when ISIS had lost all its territory in Iraq, the government declared victory.

==== 2019-2021 protests ====
One of the main causes for popular discontent in Iraq is the lack of reliable electricity infrastructure and clean water. The electrical grid faces systemic pressures due to climate change, fuel shortages, and an increase in demand. Corruption remains endemic throughout Iraqi governance while the United States-endorsed sectarian political system has driven increased levels of violent terrorism and sectarian conflicts. Climate change is driving wide-scale droughts while water reserves are rapidly depleting. Nationwide protests erupted in Iraq in October 2019, demanding systemic reform, and the end of the party-based quota system as well as the disarmament of non-state militias and end to foreign interference. Despite heavy repression, hundreds of deaths, and widespread injuries, the movement remained united around calls for institutional reform and increased accountability. In 2020, the sitting prime minister Adil Abdul Mahdi resigned in the face of popular demand. He was succeeded by prime minister Mustafa al-Kadhimi, whose tenure coincided with the onset of the COVID-19 pandemic. The subsequent macroeconomic shock caused a severe decline in oil prices, critically impacting Iraq's oil-dependent economy. The country has been in a prolonged drought since 2020 and experienced its second-driest season in the past four decades in 2021. Water flows in the Tigris and Euphrates were down 30-40% in 2023. Half the country's farmland is at risk of desertification. Nearly 40% of Iraq "has been overtaken by blowing desert sands that claim tens of thousands of acres of arable land every year".

==== Period of stability (2022–present) ====
Since 2022, Iraq has experienced a period of relative political, security, and economic stabilisation. Government officials have cited increased regional diplomacy, improved international relations, and economic diversification initiatives such as the Iraq–Europe Development Road project as key indicators of recovery. In August 2023, the Iraq Development Fund was established whose purpose is to strengthen the private sector and finance projects of crucial social and environmental value. In 2024, Iraq experienced unprecedented rainfall that —according to the Ministry of Water Resources— boosted Iraq's strategic water reserves by 10%, significantly easing the drought crisis. In February 2025, the Iraq Development Fund had gained $7bn in foreign direct investments, and signed Memoranda of Understanding with a number of countries including the United Kingdom and Japan. In May 2025, Iraqi Ministry of Planning announced that the unemployment rate in Iraq had dropped from 17% in 2022 to 13% in 2025. A report published on 24 July 2025 and submitted to the United Nations Security Council, assessed that ISIS "is at its weakest" in Iraq since its emergence. In 2025, the UNDP announced that Iraq had reached a Human Development Index score of 0.712, surpassing the Arab states average. With reform and investment into the country's human capital, Iraq could reach the ranks of countries with 'very high human development' (HDI 0.800 and above) by 2035.

United Stated troops concluded their withdrawal from Iraq in September 2026. leading to a new Iraqi holiday known as Iraq's Sovereignty Day, which is a four-day long Holiday beginning from 30 September 2026.

== Geography ==
Iraq lies between latitudes 29° and 38° N, and longitudes 39° and 49° E (a small area lies west of 39°). Spanning 437,072 km^{2} (168,754 mi^{2}), it is the 58th-largest country in the world.

It has a coastline measuring 58 km (36 miles) on the northern Persian Gulf. Further north, but below the main headwaters only, the country easily encompasses the Mesopotamian Alluvial Plain. Two major rivers, the Tigris and Euphrates, run south through Iraq and into the Shatt al-Arab, thence the Persian Gulf. Broadly flanking this estuary (known as arvandrūd: اروندرود among Iranians) are marshlands, semi-agricultural. Flanking and between the two major rivers are fertile alluvial plains, as the rivers carry about 60,000,000 m^{3} (78,477,037 cu yd) of silt annually to the delta.

The central part of the south, which slightly tapers in favour of other countries, is natural vegetation marsh mixed with rice paddies and is humid, relative to the rest of the plains. Iraq has the northwestern end of the Zagros mountain range and the eastern part of the Syrian Desert.

Rocky deserts cover about 40 percent of Iraq. Another 30 percent is mountainous with bitterly cold winters. The north of the country is mostly composed of mountains; the highest point being at 3,611 m (11,847 ft). Iraq is home to seven terrestrial ecoregions: Zagros Mountains forest steppe, Middle East steppe, Mesopotamian Marshes, Eastern Mediterranean conifer-sclerophyllous-broadleaf forests, Arabian Desert, Mesopotamian shrub desert, and South Iran Nubo-Sindian desert and semi-desert.

=== Climate ===
Köppen–Geiger climate classification

Much of Iraq has a hot arid climate with subtropical influence. Summer temperatures average above 40 °C (104 °F) for most of the country and frequently exceed 48 °C (118.4 °F). Winter temperatures infrequently exceed 15 °C (59.0 °F) with maxima roughly 5 to 10 °C (41.0 to 50.0 °F) and night-time lows 1 to 5 °C (33.8 to 41.0 °F). Typically, precipitation is low; most places receive less than 250 mm (9.8 in) annually, with maximum rainfall occurring during the winter months. Rainfall during the summer is rare, except in northern parts of the country.

The northern mountainous regions have cold winters with occasional heavy snows, sometimes causing extensive flooding. Iraq is highly vulnerable to climate change. The country is subject to rising temperatures and reduced rainfall, and suffers from increasing water scarcity for a human population that rose tenfold between 1890 and 2010 and continues to rise.

The country's electrical grid faces systemic pressures due to climate change, fuel shortages, and an increase in demand. Corruption remains endemic throughout all levels of Iraqi governance while the political system has exacerbated sectarian conflict. Climate change is driving wide-scale droughts across the country while water reserves are rapidly depleting. The country has been in a prolonged drought since 2020 and experienced its second-driest season in the past four decades in 2021. Water flows in the Tigris and Euphrates are down between 30 and 40%. Half of the country's farmland is at risk of desertification. Nearly 40% of Iraq "has been overtaken by blowing desert sands that claim tens of thousands of acres of arable land every year".

However, in 2023, Mohammed Shia al-Sudani announced that government was working on a wider "Iraqi vision for climate action". The plan would include promoting clean and renewable energy, new irrigation and water treatment projects and reduced industrial gas flaring, he said. Sudani said Iraq was "moving forward to conclude contracts for constructing renewable energy power plants to provide one-third of our electricity demand by 2030". In addition, Iraq will plant 5 million trees across the country and will create green belts around cities to act as windbreaks against dust storms.

In the same year, Iraq and TotalEnergies signed a $27 billion energy deal that aims to increase oil production and boost the country's capacity to produce energy with four oil, gas and renewables projects. According to experts, the project will "accelerate Iraq's path to energy self-sufficiency and advance Iraq's collective climate change objectives".

=== Biodiversity ===
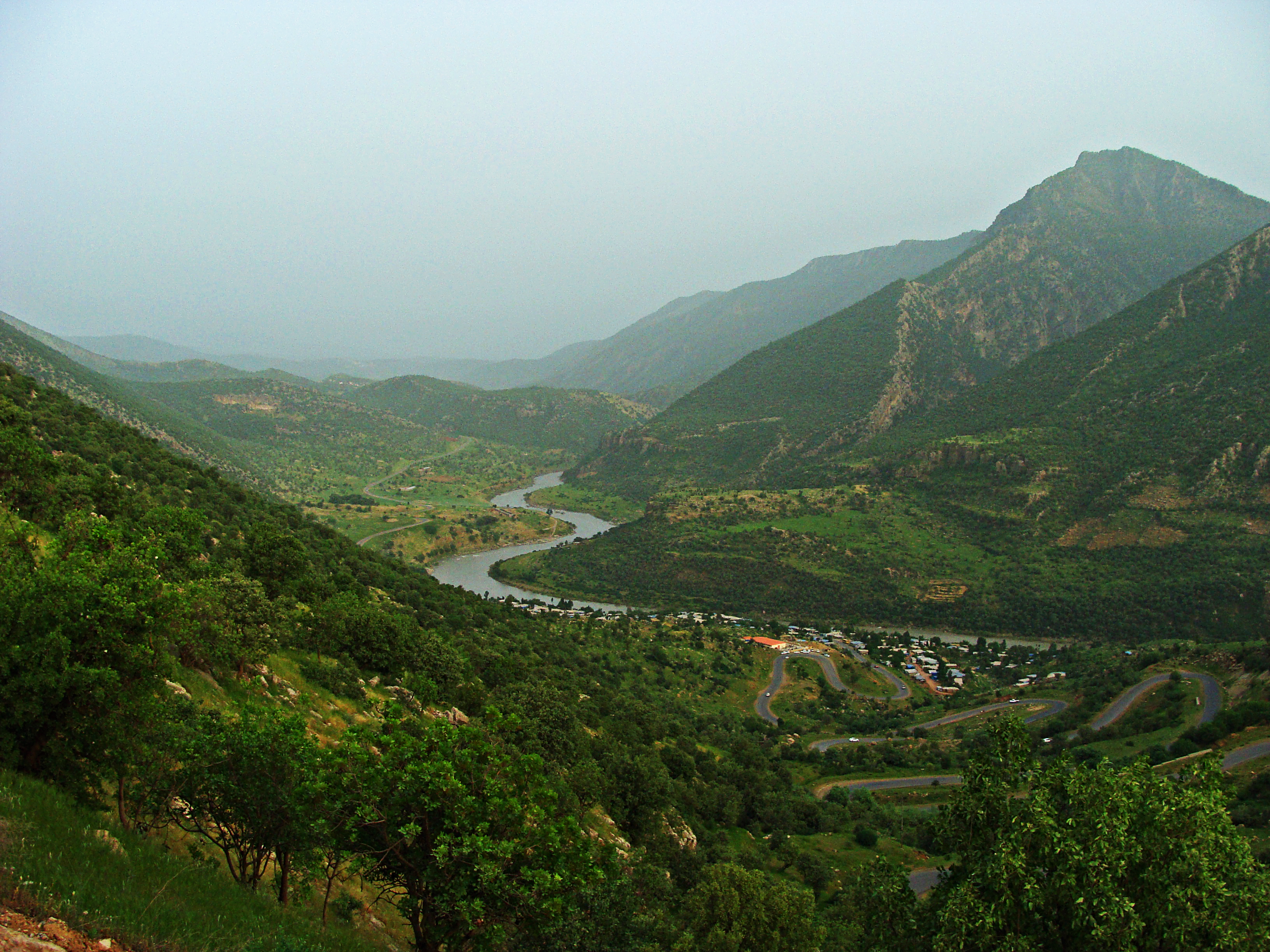
A valley in the north of the region, through which the Great Zab flows

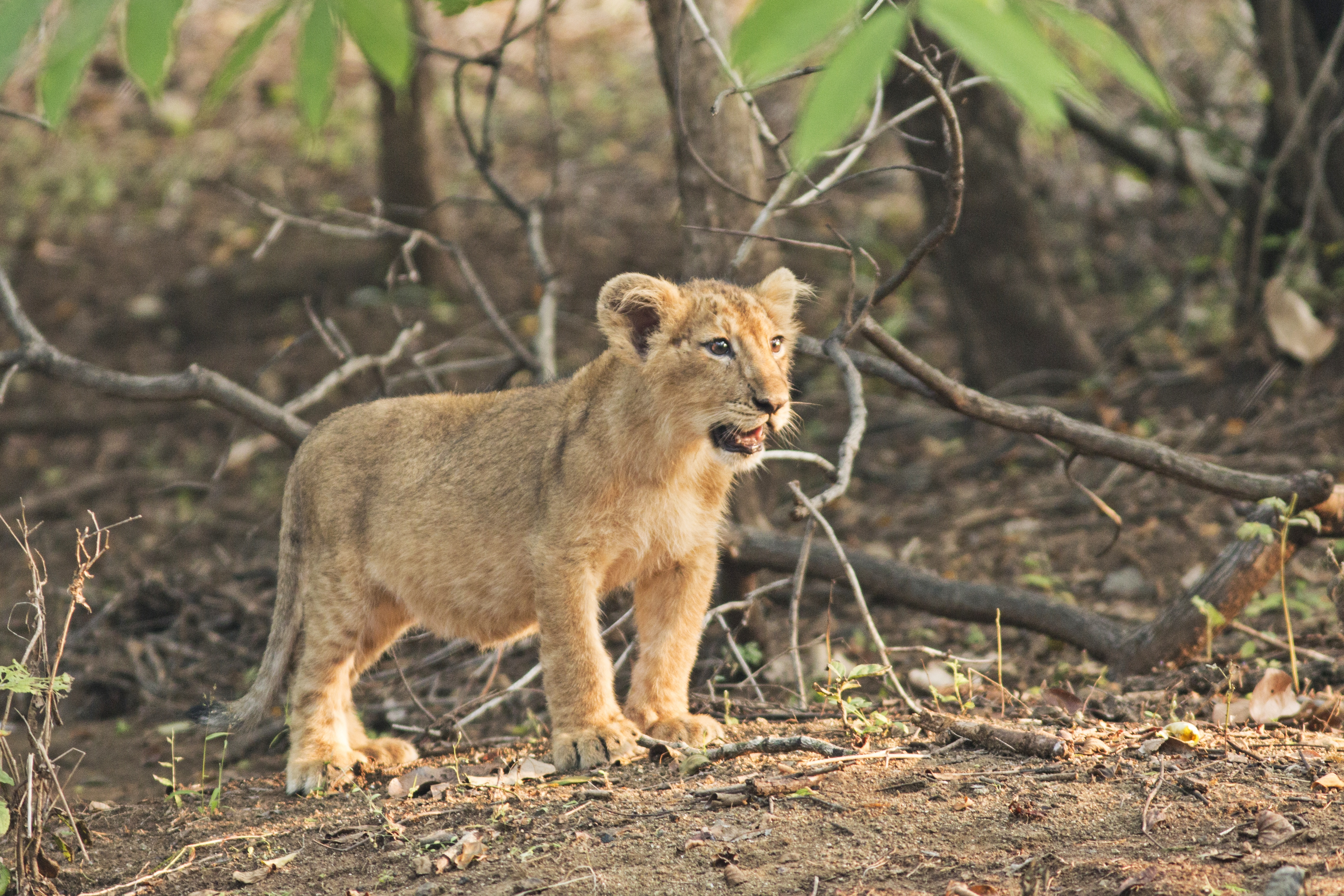
The Asiatic lion has remained a prominent symbol since ancient times, despite its extinction in the country

The wildlife of Iraq includes its flora and fauna and their natural habitats. Iraq has multiple and diverse biomes which include the mountainous region in the north to the wet marshlands along the Euphrates and Tigris rivers, while western part of the country comprises mainly desert and some semi-arid regions. Many of Iraq's bird species were endangered, including seven of Iraq's mammal species and 12 of its bird species. The Mesopotamian marches in the middle and south are home to approximately 50 species of birds, and rare species of fish. At risk are some 50% of the world's marbled teal population that live in the marshes, along with 60% of the world's population of Basra reed-warbler.

The Asiatic lion, in the present-day extinct in the region, has remained a prominent symbol of the country throughout history. Draining of the Mesopotamian Marshes, during the time of Saddam's government, caused there a significant drop in biological life. Since the 2003–2011, flow is restored and the ecosystem has begun to recover. Iraqi corals are some of the most extreme heat-tolerant as the seawater in this area ranges between 14 and 34 °C. Aquatic or semi-aquatic wildlife occurs in and around these, the major lakes are Lake Habbaniyah, Lake Milh, Lake Qadisiyah and Lake Tharthar.

== Government and politics ==
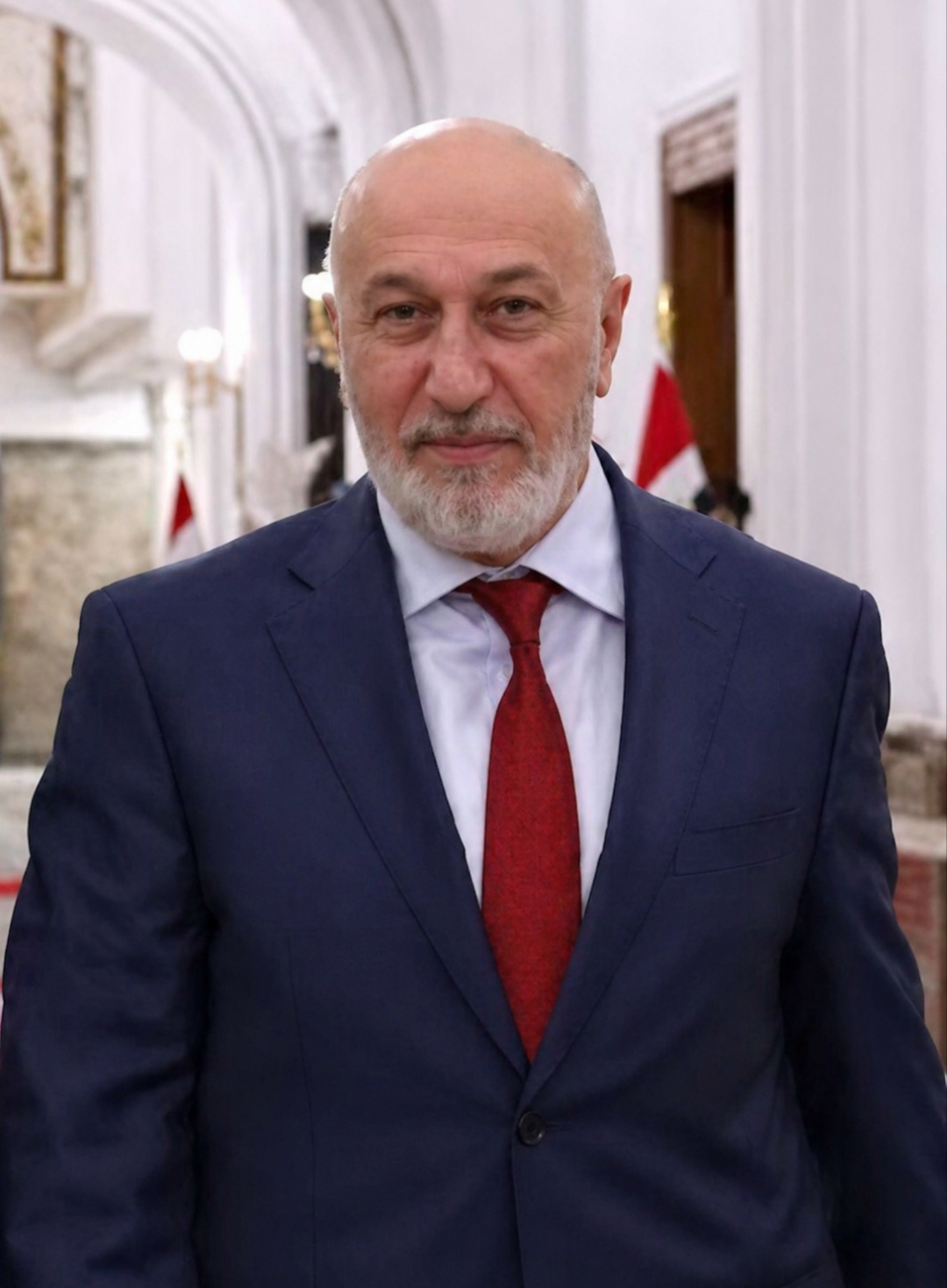
Nizar Amidi
President

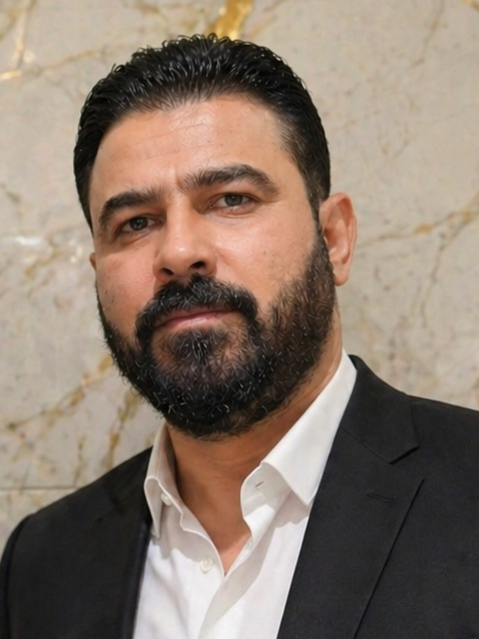
Ali al-Zaidi
Prime Minister

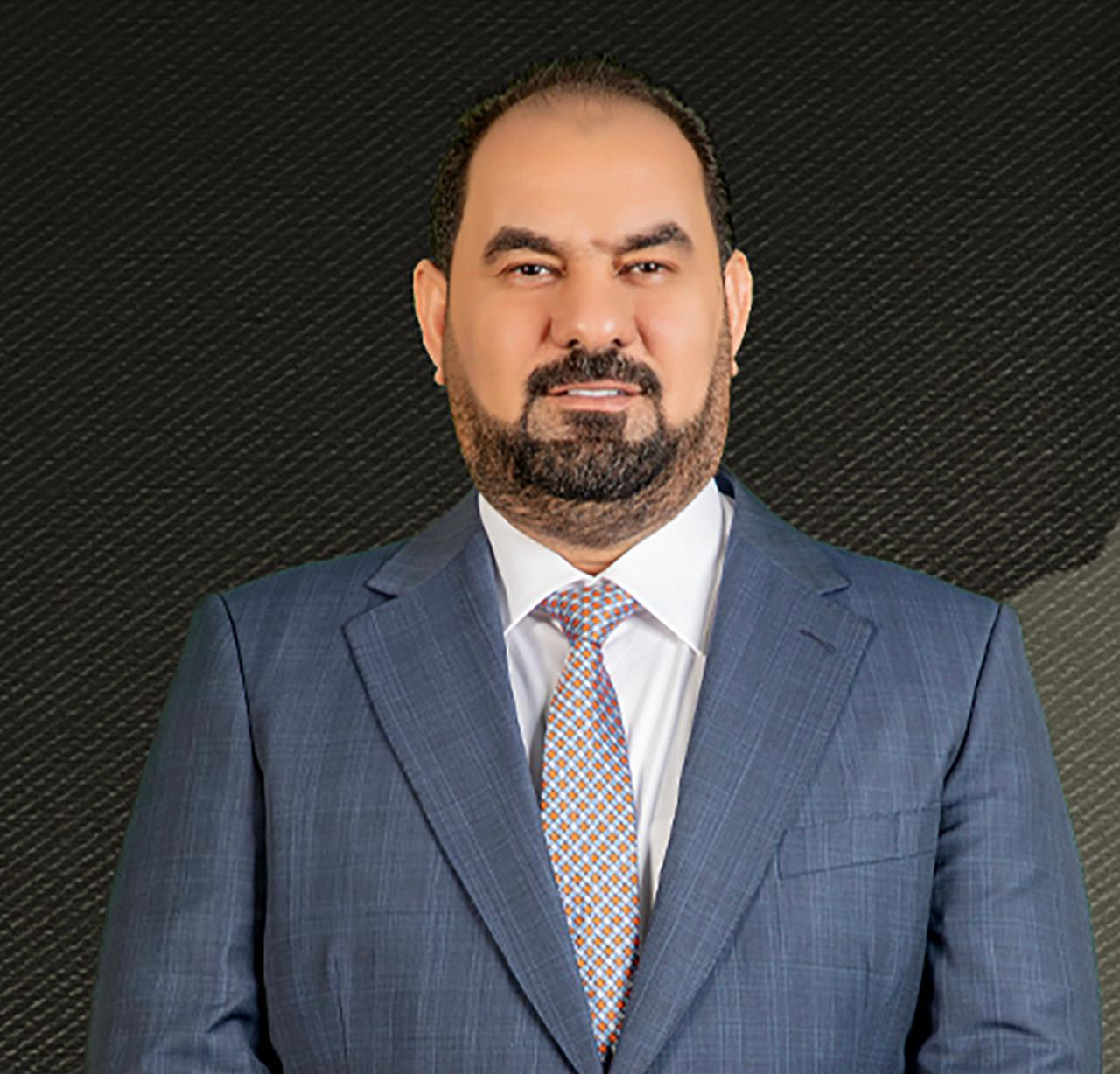
Haibat al-Halbousi
Speaker

Iraq is defined under the current constitution as a democratic federal parliamentary republic. The system of government is composed of the executive, legislative, and judicial branches, as well as numerous independent commissions. Iraq is administratively divided into subnational federal regions, governorates, districts and subdistricts with jurisdiction over various matters as defined by law. The president is the ceremonial head of state, while the prime minister is the head of government and the commander-in-chief of the armed forces with direct executive authority over general state policy. The constitution provides for two deliberative bodies, the Council of Representatives and the Council of Union. The judiciary is free and independent of the executive and the legislature.

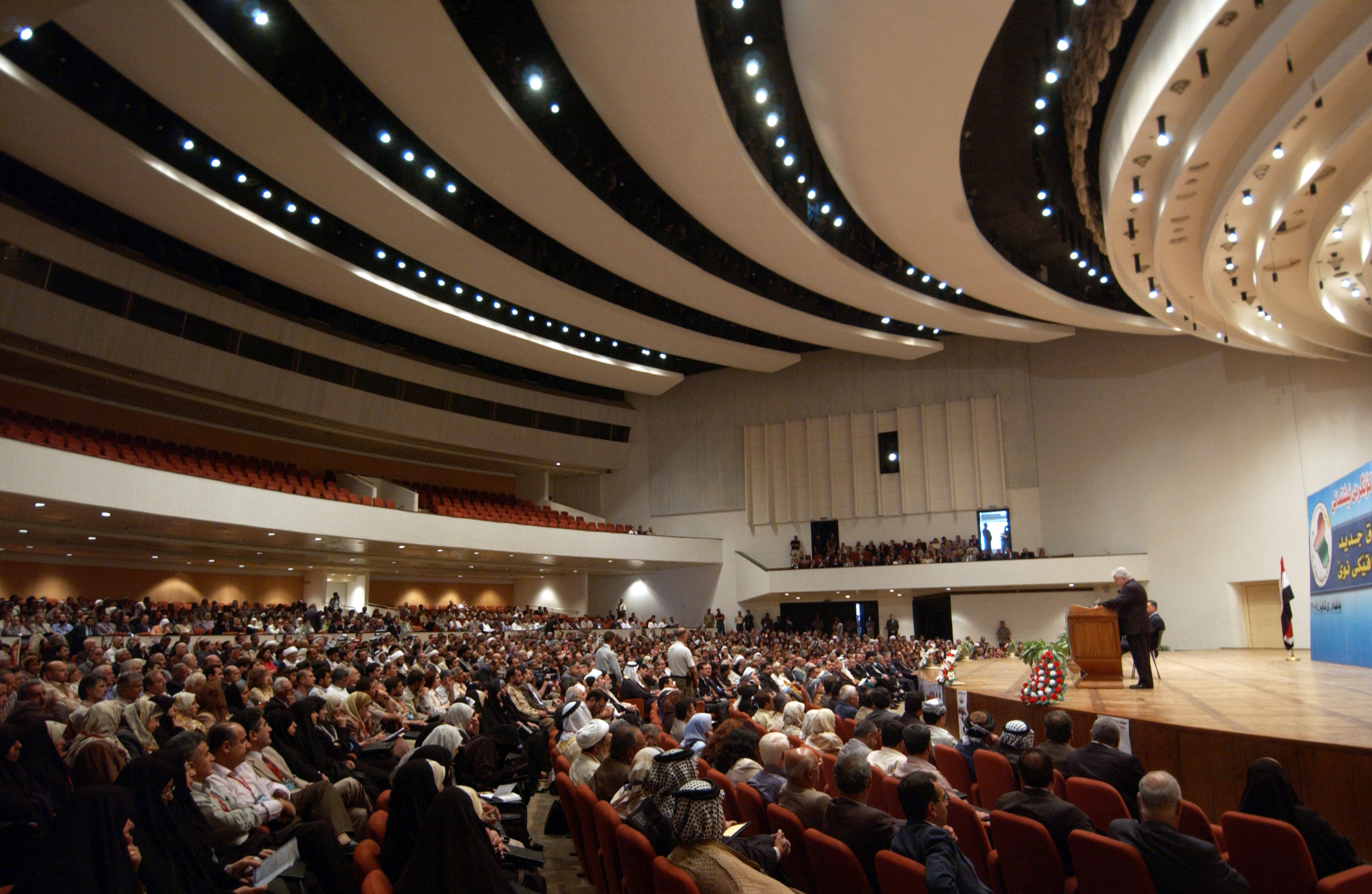
Council of Representatives of Iraq meeting at Baghdad

Baghdad is the capital, home to the seat of government; within this is the Green Zone, which contains governmental headquarters, ministries, state institutions, and the army, in addition to containing consulates and the embassies—including the largest embassy in the world and headquarters of foreign organisations and intentions agencies.

According to the International Institute for Democracy and Electrocal Assistance's Global State of Democracy (GSoD) Indices and Democracy Tracker, Iraq performs in the low to mid-range on overall democratic measures, with particular weaknesses in political equality, including economic equality and social group equality. Additionally, according to the 2023 V-Dem Democracy indices Iraq was the third most electoral democratic country in the Middle East. Before 2003, the government employed 1 million people, but this increased to around 7 million in 2016. In combination with decreased oil prices, the government budget deficit is near 25% of GDP as of 2016.

=== Law ===
In October 2005, the new Constitution of Iraq was approved in a referendum with a 78% overall majority, although the percentage of support varied widely between the country's territories. The new constitution was backed by the Shia and Kurdish communities, but was rejected by Sunni Arabs. Under the terms of the constitution, the country conducted fresh nationwide parliamentary elections on 15 December 2005. All three major ethnic groups in Iraq voted along ethnic lines, as did Assyrian and Turcoman minorities. Law no. 188 of the year 1959 (Personal Status Law) made polygamy extremely difficult, granted child custody to the mother in case of divorce, prohibited repudiation and marriage under the age of 16. Article 1 of Civil Code also identifies Islamic law as a formal source of law. Iraq had no Sharia courts but civil courts used Sharia for issues of personal status including marriage and divorce. In 1995 Iraq introduced Sharia punishment for certain types of criminal offences. The code is based on French civil law as well as Sunni and Jafari (Shi'ite) interpretations of Sharia.

In 2004, the CPA chief executive L. Paul Bremer said he would veto any constitutional draft stating that sharia is the principal basis of law. The declaration enraged many local Shia clerics, and by 2005 the US had relented, allowing a role for sharia in the constitution to help end a stalemate on the draft constitution. The Iraqi Penal Code is the statutory law of Iraq.

=== Military and law enforcement ===
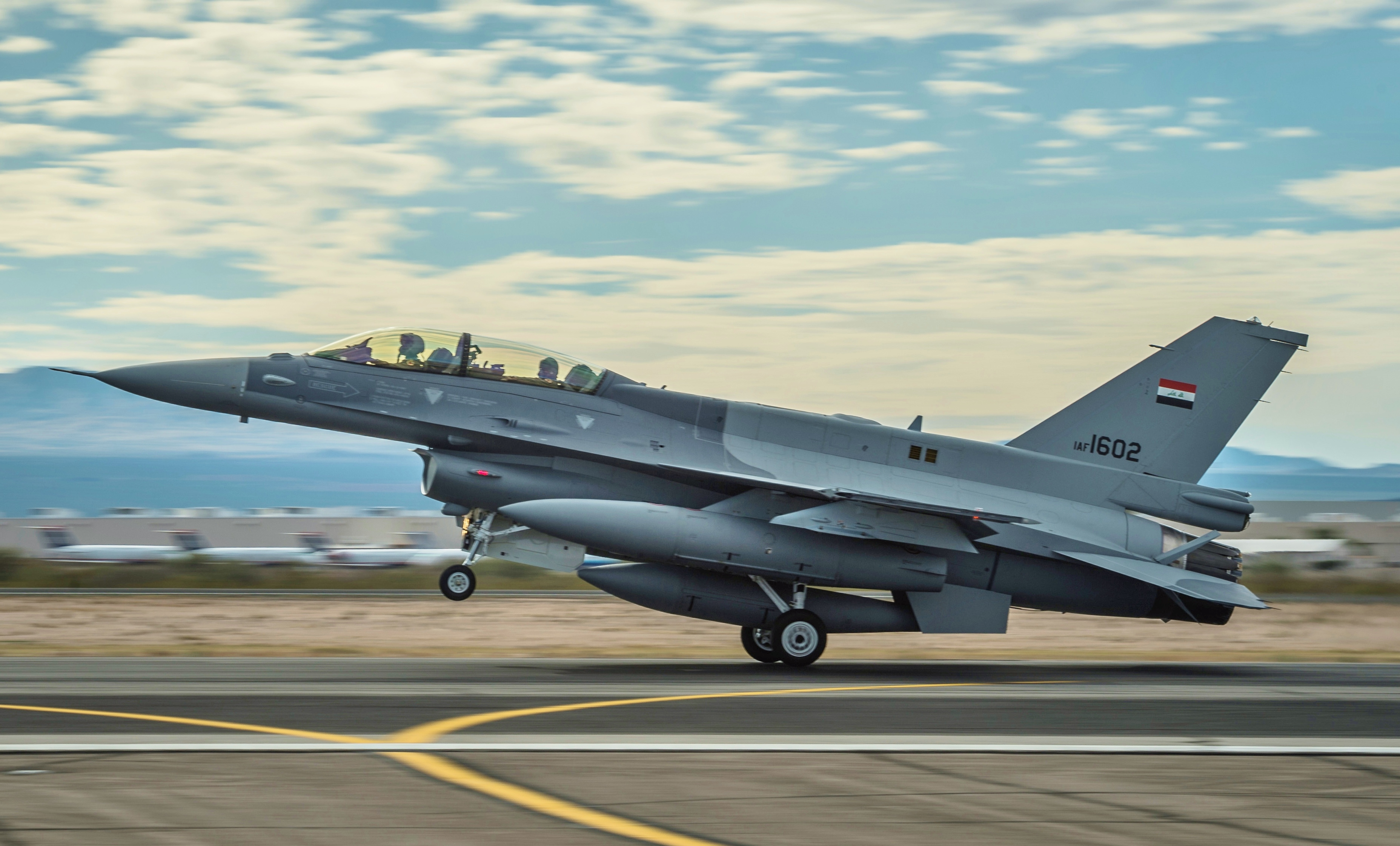
An F-16 Fighting Falcon, the main combat aircraft of the Iraqi Air Force, during a take-off

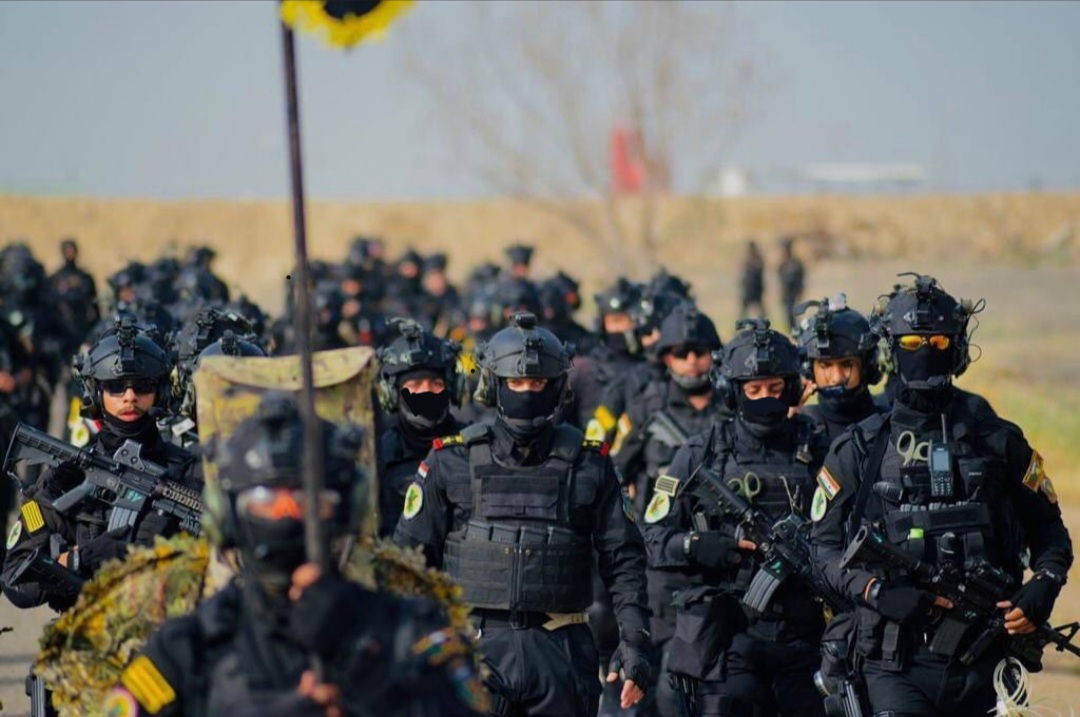
ISOF during training in Babylon, 2021

Iraqi security forces are composed of forces serving under the Ministry of Interior (MOI) and the Ministry of Defense (MOD), as well as the Iraqi Counter Terrorism Bureau, reporting directly to the Prime Minister of Iraq, which oversees the Iraqi Special Operations Forces. MOD forces include the Iraqi Army (including the Iraqi Army Aviation Command), the Iraqi Air Force, the Iraqi Air Defence Command and the Iraqi Navy. The MOD also runs a Joint Staff College, training army, navy, and air force officers, with support from the NATO Training Mission - Iraq. The college was established at Ar Rustamiyah on 27 September 2005. The center runs Junior Staff and Senior Staff Officer Courses designed for first lieutenants to majors.

The current Iraqi armed forces were rebuilt after the US invasion of Iraq, with large amounts of American military aid at all levels. The army consists of 14 divisions, all of them infantry, except for the ninth division, which is motorized infantry. Each division consists of four brigades and comprises 14,000 soldiers. Before 2003, Iraq was mostly equipped with Soviet-made military equipment, the country has since turned to Western suppliers.

The Iraqi air force is designed to support ground forces with surveillance, reconnaissance and troop lift. Two reconnaissance squadrons use light aircraft, three helicopter squadrons are used to move troops and one air transportation squadron uses C-130 transport aircraft to move troops, equipment, and supplies. The air force currently has 5,000 personnel. It was planned to increase to 18,000 personnel, with 550 aircraft by 2018, but that did not happen as planned.

As of February 2011, the navy had approximately 5,000 sailors, including 800 marines. The navy consists of an operational headquarters, five afloat squadrons, and two marine battalions, designed to protect shorelines and inland waterways from insurgent infiltration.

=== Foreign relations ===
States with which Iraq has diplomatic relations.

After the end of the Iraq War, Iraq sought and strengthened regional economic cooperation and improved relations with neighbouring countries. On 12 February 2009, Iraq officially became the 186th State Party to the Chemical Weapons Convention. Under the provisions of this treaty, Iraq is considered a party with declared stockpiles of chemical weapons. Because of their late accession, Iraq is the only State Party exempt from the existing timeline for destruction of their chemical weapons.

Since the situation eased, Iraq reengaged with its Arab neighbours while maintaining relations with Iran in an attempt to position Iraq as a country that would not exacerbate the security concerns of its neighbours and seeking a pragmatic balance in foreign relations. Iran–Iraq relations have flourished since 2005 by the exchange of high-level visits. A conflict occurred in December 2009, when Iraq accused Iran of seizing an oil well on the border. Relations with Turkey are tense, largely because of the Kurdistan Regional Government, as clashes between Turkey and the PKK continue. In October 2011, the Turkish parliament renewed a law that gives Turkish forces the ability to pursue rebels over the border in Iraq. Turkey's "Great Anatolia Project" reduced Iraq's water supply and affected agriculture. Prime Minister Mohammed Shia al-Sudani has sought to normalise relations with Syria in order to expand cooperation. Iraq is also seeking to deepen its ties with the Gulf Cooperation Council countries. Foreign ministers of Iraq and Kuwait have announced that they were working on a definitive agreement on border demarcation.

On 17 November 2008, the US and Iraq agreed to a Status of Forces Agreement, as part of the broader Strategic Framework Agreement. On 5 January 2020, the Iraqi parliament voted for a resolution that urges the government to work on expelling US troops from Iraq. The resolution was passed two days after a US drone strike that killed Iranian Major General Qasem Soleimani of the Islamic Revolutionary Guard Corps, commander of the Quds Force. The resolution specifically calls for ending of a 2014 agreement allowing Washington to help Iraq against Islamic State groups by sending troops. This resolution will also signify ending an agreement with Washington to station troops in Iraq as Iran vows to retaliate after the killing. On 28 September 2020, Washington made preparations to withdraw diplomats from Iraq, as a result of Iranian-backed militias firing rockets at the American Embassy in Baghdad. The officials said that the move was seen as an escalation of American confrontation with Iran. The United States significantly reduced its military presence in Iraq after the defeat of ISIS. The U.S. troops withdrew completely on 30 September 2026, marking an end to their presence in the country.

=== Human rights ===
Relations between Iraq and its Kurdish population have been sour in recent history, especially with Saddam Hussein's genocidal campaign against them in the 1980s. After uprisings during the early 90s, many Kurds fled their homeland and no-fly zones were established in northern Iraq to prevent more conflicts. Despite historically poor relations, some progress has been made, and Iraq elected its first Kurdish president, Jalal Talabani, in 2005. Furthermore, Kurdish is now an official language of Iraq alongside Arabic according to Article 4 of the Constitution.

LGBT rights in Iraq remain limited. Although decriminalised, homosexuality remains stigmatised in Iraqi society. Human rights in Islamic State-controlled territory have been recorded as highly violated. It included mass executions in Islamic State-occupied part of Mosul and genocide of the Yazidis in Yazidi populated Sinjar, which is in northern Iraq.

=== Administrative divisions ===
In terms of administrative divisions, Iraq is currently composed of a single federal region (iqlīm ittihādi) and nineteen governorates (muhafadhat, singular muhafadhah). The governorates are divided into districts (or aqdhiyah, singular qadhā), which are further divided into sub-districts (or nawāḥī, singular nāhiyah). There are 120 districts and 394 subdistricts in Iraq.

Clickable map of Iraq exhibiting its eighteen governorates, and partially recognized Halabja.

A clickable map of Iraq exhibiting its governorates.

- Dohuk
- Nineveh
- Erbil
- Kirkuk
- Sulaymaniyah
- Saladin
- Al Anbar
- Baghdad
- Diyala
- Karbala
- Babylon
- Wasit
- Najaf
- Al-Qadisiyyah
- Maysan
- Muthanna
- Dhi Qar
- Basra
- Halabja

== Economy ==
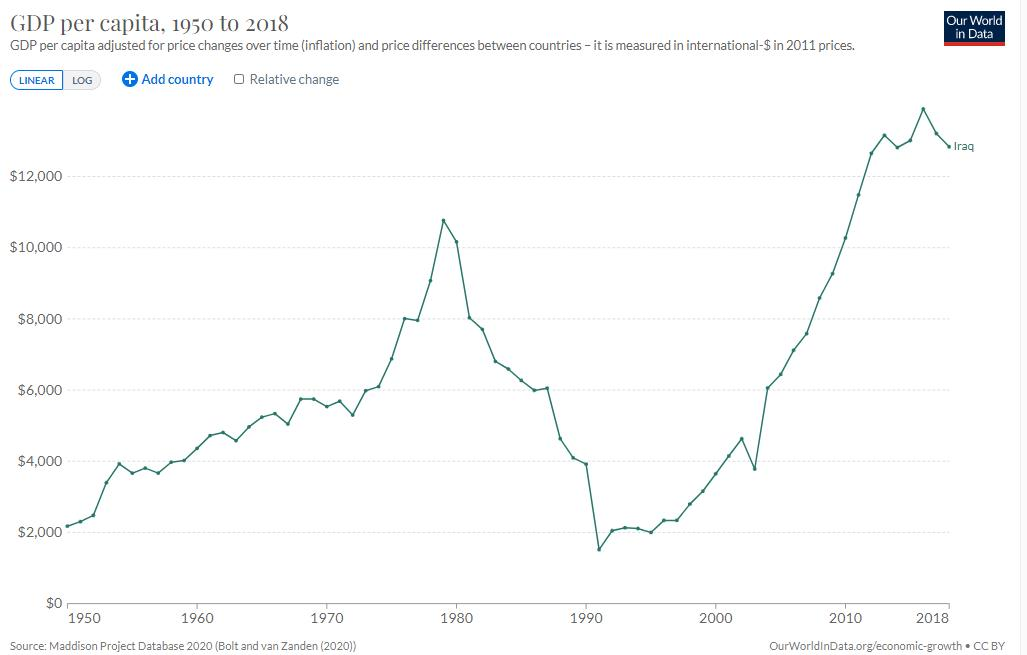
Historical economic growth of Iraq

According to the International Fund for Agricultural Development, Iraq is an oil-rich upper-middle-income country. Iraq's economy is dominated by the oil sector, which has traditionally provided about 95% of foreign exchange earnings. The lack of development in other sectors has resulted in 18%–30% unemployed and a per capita GDP of $4,812. Public sector employment accounted for nearly 60% of full-time employment in 2011. The oil export industry, which dominates the Iraqi economy, generates little employment. Currently only a modest percentage of women (the highest estimate for 2011 was 22%) participate in the labour force. The official currency in Iraq is the Iraqi dinar. The Central Provisional Authority issued new dinar coins and notes, with the notes printed by De La Rue using modern anti-forgery techniques. Jim Cramer's 20 October 2009 endorsement of the Iraqi dinar on CNBC has further piqued interest in the investment.

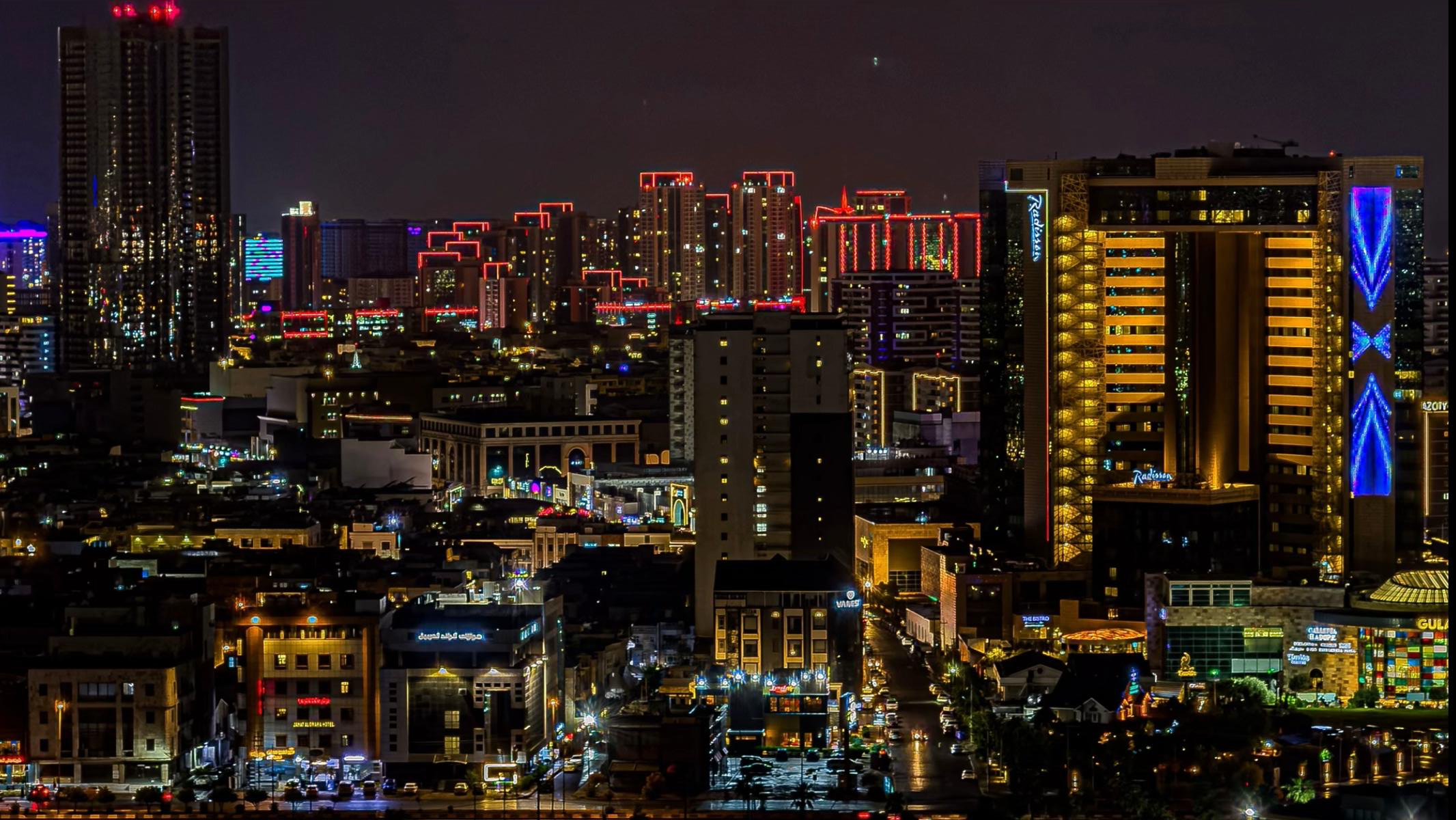
Erbil skyline at night

Prior to the 2003 invasion, Iraq's centrally planned economy prohibited the foreign ownership of businesses, ran most large industries as state-owned enterprises, and imposed large tariffs to keep the foreign goods out. Oil was nationalised in 1972 and its revenue was spent on government development projects. Iraq was one of the most advanced countries in the Middle East. But it faced economic decline as a result of sanctions. After 2003, the Coalition Provisional Authority quickly began issuing many binding orders privatising the Iraqi economy and opening it up to foreign investment. On 20 November 2004, the Paris Club of creditor countries agreed to write off 80% ($33 billion) of Iraq's $42 billion debt to Club members. Iraq's total external debt was around $120 billion at the time of the invasion, and had grown another $5 billion by 2004. The debt relief was to be implemented in three stages: two of 30% each and one of 20%.

Five years after the invasion, an estimated 2.4 million people were internally displaced (with a further two million refugees outside Iraq), four million Iraqis were considered food-insecure (a quarter of children were chronically malnourished) and only a third of Iraqi children had access to safe drinking water. In 2022, and after more than 30 years after the UN Compensation Commission was created to ensure restitution for Kuwait following the invasion of 1990, the reparations body announced that Iraq has paid a total of $52.4 billion in war reparations to Kuwait. According to the Overseas Development Institute, international NGOs face challenges in carrying out their mission, leaving their assistance "piecemeal and largely conducted undercover, hindered by insecurity, a lack of coordinated funding, limited operational capacity and patchy information". International NGOs have been targeted and during the first 5 years, 94 aid workers were killed, 248 injured, 24 arrested or detained and 89 kidnapped or abducted.

The economy has been heavily affected by the war. According to a report by the Arab News, Iraq has shown positive signs of recovery. The Kurdish and Shia populated regions of Iraq experienced an economic boom after the end of the war, and until 2023, Kurdistan Region was considered economically more stable —mostly driven by hitherto independent oil exports. Recent developments in the internal political dynamics of the country has seen Baghdad reassert full control over the oil industry of the country and has been since considered more stable and prosperous, while Kurdistan Region has experienced an economic downfall. In recent years, Sunni-populated provinces in Iraq have also made economic progress, as evidenced by numerous new construction projects. In 2025, parliament speaker Mahmoud al-Mashhadani stressed that Iraq is stable in terms of security and economy and has taken a non-aligned approach. According to a new report from the Arab Investment & Export Credit Guarantee Corporation ("Dhaman"), the United Arab Emirates, Saudi Arabia, Egypt, Iraq, and Algeria, the leading contributors to the Arab economy and 72% of the region's GDP. In addition, Iraq is an agricultural country. Tourism in Iraq stands to be a major growth sector, including archaeological tourism and religious tourism while the country is also considered to be a potential location for ecotourism.

=== Tourism ===
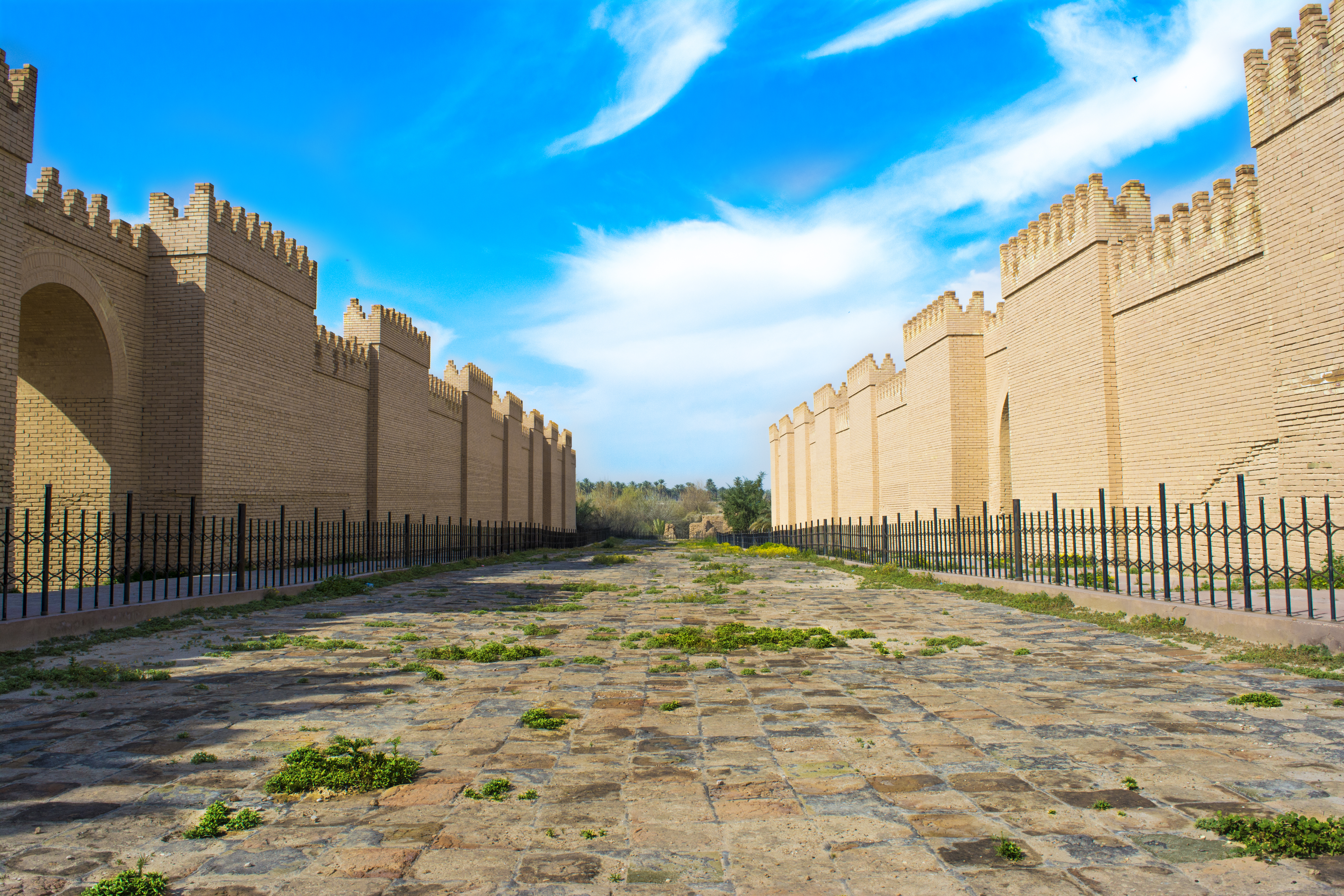
A reconstructed portion of the ruins of Babylon

Iraq was an important tourist destination for many years but that changed dramatically during the war with Iran and after the invasion by the US and allies. As Iraq continues to develop and stabilises, tourism in Iraq is still facing many challenges, and little has been made by the government to meet its tremendous potential as a global tourist destination, and gain the associated economic benefits, mainly due to conflicts. Sites from Iraq's ancient past are numerous and many that are close to large cities have been excavated. Babylon has seen major recent restoration; known for its famous Ziggurat (the inspiration for the Biblical Tower of Babel), the Hanging Gardens (one of the Seven Wonders of the World), and the Ishtar Gate, making it a prime destination.

Nineveh, a rival to Babylon, has also seen significant restoration and reconstruction. Ur, one of the first Sumerian cities, which is near Nasiriyya, has been partially restored. This is a list of examples of some significant sites in a country with a tremendous archaeological and historic wealth. Iraq is considered to be a potential location for ecotourism. The tourism in Iraq includes also making pilgrimages to holy Shia Islamic sites near Karbala and Najaf. Since 2003, Najaf and Karbala have experienced economic boom, due to religious tourism.

Saddam Hussein built hundreds of palaces and monuments across the country. Some of them include Al-Faw Palace, As-Salam Palace and Radwaniyah Palace. Al-Faw Palace is currently occupied by the American University of Iraq. Since Saddam's overthrow, the palaces are open to tourists, though they are not officially functioning, and the government of Iraq is considering to sell them for useful purposes. A majority of these structures were built after the 1991 Gulf War, when Iraq was put under sanctions by the United Nations. Saddam reconstructed part of Babylon, one of the world's earliest cities, using bricks inscribed with his name to associate himself with the region's past glories. One of his palaces in Basra was turned into a museum, despite it was time when Iraq allied with the US was engaged in war with the ISIS.

=== Transport ===
The 150 Meter Motorway is Erbil's largest ring road, built to improve traffic flow and connect expanding areas of the city.

Iraq has a modern network of motorways. Roadways extended 45,550 km (28,300 mi). The roadway also connect Iraq to neighbouring countries of Iran, Turkey, Syria, Jordan, Saudi Arabia and Kuwait. There are more than seven million passenger cars, over million commercial taxis, buses, and trucks in use. On major motorways the maximum speed is 110 km/h (68 mph). Many of the roads were constructed in the late 1970s and early 1980s and were designed with a 20-year lifespan. Most of these facilities were damaged in enduring wars, that Iraq experienced. Since then traffic has been a serious issue, specially in Baghdad.

Iraqi Republic Railways is the responsible body for railway transportation in Iraq. The railway infrastructure consists of 2,405 km (1,494 mi) of track, 109 stations, 31 locomotives and 1,685 units of rolling stock. The government is attempting to establish railway links with Turkey, Kuwait, and Saudi Arabia to complete a continuous Euro-Gulf rail route. Currently, a large project is underway to connect Karbala and Najaf.

Most of Iraq's oil exports are done through its ports. Basra is the only coastal governorate of Iraq. It is home to all of Iraq's six ports—Abu Flous Port, Al Başrah Oil Terminal, Grand Faw Port, Khor Al Amaya Oil Terminal, Khor Al Zubair Port, Port of Basra and Umm Qasr Port. Iraq has about 104 airports as of 2012. Major airports at Baghdad, Basra, Erbil, Sulaymaniyah, Kirkuk and Najaf. The government is constructing international airports for Karbala and Nasiriyah. Nasiriyah Airport is in partnership with China and reoping of Mosul Airport, which was closed during the 2013–2017 civil war.

=== Oil and energy ===
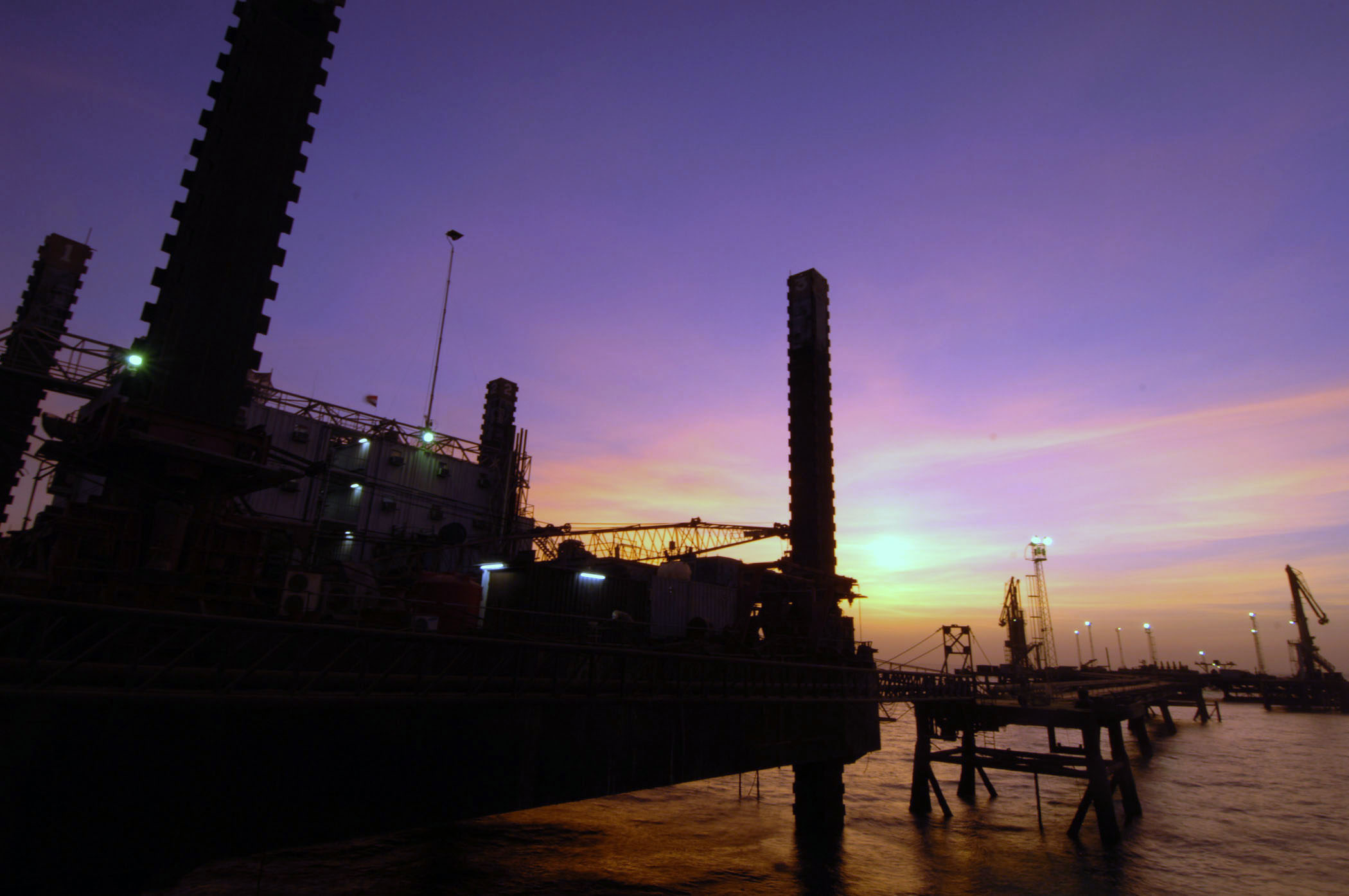
Khawr Al Amaya Oil Terminal

With its 143.1 billion barrels (2.275×10^{10} m^{3}) of proved oil reserves, Iraq ranks third in the world behind Venezuela and Saudi Arabia in the amount of oil reserves. Oil production levels reached 3.4 million barrels per day by December 2012. Only about 2,000 oil wells have been drilled in Iraq, compared with about 1 million wells in Texas alone. Iraq was one of the founding members of OPEC.

During the 1970s Iraq produced up to 3.5 million barrels per day, but sanctions imposed against Iraq after its invasion of Kuwait in 1990 crippled the country's oil sector. The sanctions prohibited Iraq from exporting oil until 1996 and Iraq's output declined by 85% in the years following the First Gulf War. The sanctions were lifted in 2003 after the US-led invasion removed Saddam Hussein from power, but development of Iraq's oil resources has been hampered by the ongoing conflict. As of 2010, despite improved security and billions of dollars in oil revenue, Iraq still generates about half the electricity that customers demand, leading to protests during the hot summer months. The Iraq oil law, a proposed piece of legislation submitted to the Council of Representatives of Iraq in 2007, has failed to gain approval due to disagreements among Iraq's various political blocs. Al Başrah Oil Terminal is a trans-shipment facility from the pipelines to the tankers and uses supertankers.

According to a US Study from May 2007, between 100,000 barrels per day (16,000 m^{3}/d) and 300,000 barrels per day (48,000 m^{3}/d) of Iraq's declared oil production over the past four years could have been siphoned off through corruption or smuggling. In 2008, Al Jazeera reported $13 billion of Iraqi oil revenues in American care was improperly accounted for, of which $2.6 billion is totally unaccounted for. Some reports that the government has reduced corruption in public procurement of oil; however, reliable reports of bribery and kickbacks to government officials persist.

On 30 June and 11 December 2009, the Ministry of Oil awarded service contracts to international oil companies for some of Iraq's many oil fields. Oil fields contracted include the "super-giant" Majnoon oil field, Halfaya Field, West Qurna Field and Rumaila Field. BP and China National Petroleum Corporation won a deal to develop Rumaila, the largest oil field in Iraq. On 14 March 2014, the International Energy Agency said Iraq's oil output jumped by half a million barrels a day in February to average 3.6 million barrels a day. The country had not pumped that much oil since 1979, when Saddam Hussein rose to power. However, on 14 July 2014, as sectarian strife had taken hold, Kurdistan Regional Government forces seized control of the Bai Hassan and Kirkuk oilfields in the north of the country, taking them from Iraq's control. Baghdad condemned the seizure and threatened "dire consequences" if the fields were not returned. On 2018, the UN estimated that oil accounts for 99% of Iraq's revenue. As of 2021, the oil sector provided about 92% of foreign exchange earnings.

=== Water supply and sanitation ===
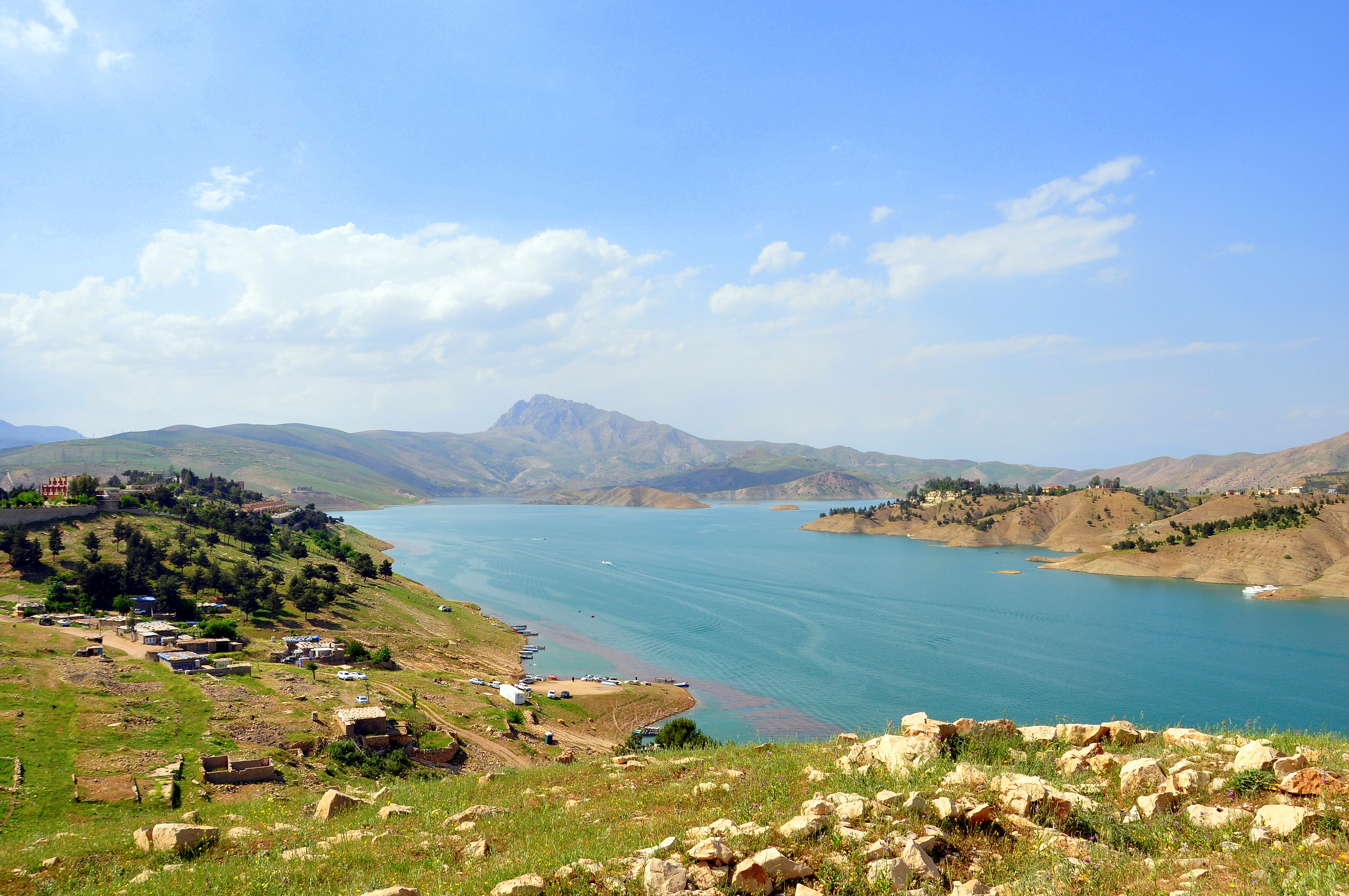
Lake Dukan

Three decades of war greatly cut the existing water resources management system for several major cities. This prompted widespread water supply and sanitation shortfalls thus poor water and service quality. This is combined with few businesses and households who are fully environmentally aware and legally compliant however the large lakes, as pictured, alleviate supply relative to many comparators in Western Asia beset by more regular drought. Access to potable water diverges among governorates and between urban and rural areas. Ninety-one percent of the population has access to potable water. Forming this figure: in rural areas, 77% of people have access to improved (treated or fully naturally filtered) drinking water sources; and 98% in urban areas. Much water is discarded during treatment, due to much outmoded equipment, raising energy burden and reducing supply.

=== Infrastructure ===
Although many infrastructure projects had already begun, at the end of 2013 Iraq had a housing crisis. The then war-ravaged country was set to complete 5 percent of the 2.5 million homes it needs to build by 2016 to keep up with demand, confirmed the Minister for Construction and Housing. In 2009, the Iraq Britain Business Council formed. Its key impetus was House of Lords member and trade expert Lady Nicholson. In 2013, South Korean firm Daewoo reached a deal to build Bismayah New City of about 600,000 residents in 100,000 homes.

In December 2020, Al-Sudani launched the second phase of the Grand Faw Port via winning bid of project head contractor Daewoo at $2.7 billion. In late 2023, the government announced that it will build a total of 15 new cities across Iraq, in an attempt to tackle a persistent housing problem, according to officials. This project falls under the government's plan and strategy to establish new residential cities outside city centres, aiming to alleviate the urban housing crisis. The first 5 new cities will be located in Baghdad, Babylon, Nineveh, Anbar and Karbala, while another 10 new residential cities will be launched in other governorates. The initial phase of the [housing] plan began in late 2023, when Al-Sudani laid the foundation stone of Al-Jawahiri city. Located west of the capital, the new city will host 30,000 housing units which will cost $2 billion. It is expected to be completed in four to five years. According to officials, none of it is financed by the government.

In 2024, and during a visit to Baghdad by Turkish President Recep Tayyip Erdogan, a quadrilateral memorandum of understanding regarding cooperation in the Iraq–Europe Development Road project was signed between Iraq, Turkey, Qatar, UAE. The deal was inked by the transportation ministers from each country. The 1,200-km project with railway and motorways which will connect the Grand Faw Port, aimed to be the largest port in the Middle East. According to officials, it is a strategic international project which will strengthen Iraq's geopolitical position.

== Demographics ==
The 2021 estimate of the total Iraqi population is 43,533,592. Iraq's population was estimated to be 2 million in 1878. In 2013 Iraq's population reached 35 million amid a post-war population boom. It is the most populous country in the Arabian Plate. Iraq is made up of three former administrative divisions (vilayets) of the Ottoman Empire—Mosul, Basra and Baghdad—which were designated as concentration of different ethnic groups.

=== Cities and towns ===
Largest cities or towns in Iraq
| Rank | Name | Governorate | Pop. | Rank | Name | Governorate | Pop. |
|---|---|---|---|---|---|---|---|
| 1 | Baghdad | Baghdad | 6,719,477 | 11 | Hillah | Babylon | 455,741 |
| 2 | Mosul | Nineveh | 1,361,819 | 12 | Diwaniyah | Al-Qādisiyyah | 403,796 |
| 3 | Basra | Basra | 1,340,827 | 13 | Kut | Wasit | 389,376 |
| 4 | Erbil | Erbil | 1,550,071 | 14 | Dohuk | Dohuk | 340,871 |
| 5 | Kirkuk | Kirkuk | 972,272 | 15 | Az Zubayr | Basra | 300,751 |
| 6 | Najaf | Najaf as-Sharif | 747,261 | 16 | Baqubah | Diyala | 279,133 |
| 7 | Karbala | Karbala | 711,530 | 17 | Fallujah | Anbar | 250,884 |
| 8 | Sulaymaniyah | Sulaymaniyah | 676,492 | 18 | Ramadi | Anbar | 223,525 |
| 9 | Nasiriyah | Dhi Qar | 558,446 | 19 | Samawah | Muthanna | 221,743 |
| 10 | Amarah | Maysan | 527,472 | 20 | Zakho | Dohuk | 211,964 |

=== Ethnic groups ===
Sunni Arabs Shiite Arabs Sunni Kurds Assyrians Yazidis Turkmen Map of all majority-group clusters of the country's ethnic groups in large, deliberately grouped, census output areas as at the 2006 to 2008 study

Iraq's native population is predominantly Arab, but also includes other ethnic groups such as Kurds, Turkmens, Assyrians, Yazidis, Shabaks, Armenians, Mandaeans, Circassians, and Kawliya.

A report by the European Parliamentary Research Service suggests that, in 2015, there were 24 million Arabs (14 million Shia and 9 million Sunni); 4.7 million Sunni Kurds (plus 500,000 Feyli Kurds and 200,000 Kaka'i); 3 million (mostly Sunni) Iraqi Turkmens; 1 million Black Iraqis; 500,000 Christians (including Assyrians and Armenians); 500,000 Yazidis; 250,000 Shabaks; 50,000 Roma; 3,000 Mandaeans; 2,000 Circassians; 1,000 of the Baháʼí Faith; and a few dozen Jews.

According to the CIA World Factbook, citing a 1987 Iraqi government estimate, the population of Iraq is 75–80% Arab followed by 15–20% Kurds. In addition, the estimate claims that other minorities form 5% of the country's population, including the Turkmens, Assyrians, Yezidis, Shabak, Kaka'i, Bedouins, Roma, Circassians, Mandaeans, and Persians. However, the International Crisis Group points out that figures from the 1987 census, as well as the 1967, 1977, and 1997 censuses, "are all considered highly problematic, due to suspicions of regime manipulation" because Iraqi citizens were only allowed to indicate belonging to either the Arab or Kurdish ethnic groups; consequently, this skewed the number of other ethnic minorities, such as Iraq's third largest ethnic group – the Turkmens.

The historic Assyrian Quarter in Baghdad housed 150,000 Armenians in 2003. Most of them fled, following the escalation of war, and today only 1,500 Armenians are found in the city. Around 20,000 Marsh Arabs live in southern Iraq. Iraq has a community of 2,500 Chechens, and some 20,000 Armenians. In southern Iraq, there is a community of Iraqis of African descent, a legacy of the slavery practised in the Islamic Caliphate beginning before the Zanj Rebellion of the 9th century, and Basra's role as a key port. It is the most populous country in the Arabian Plate.

=== Languages ===
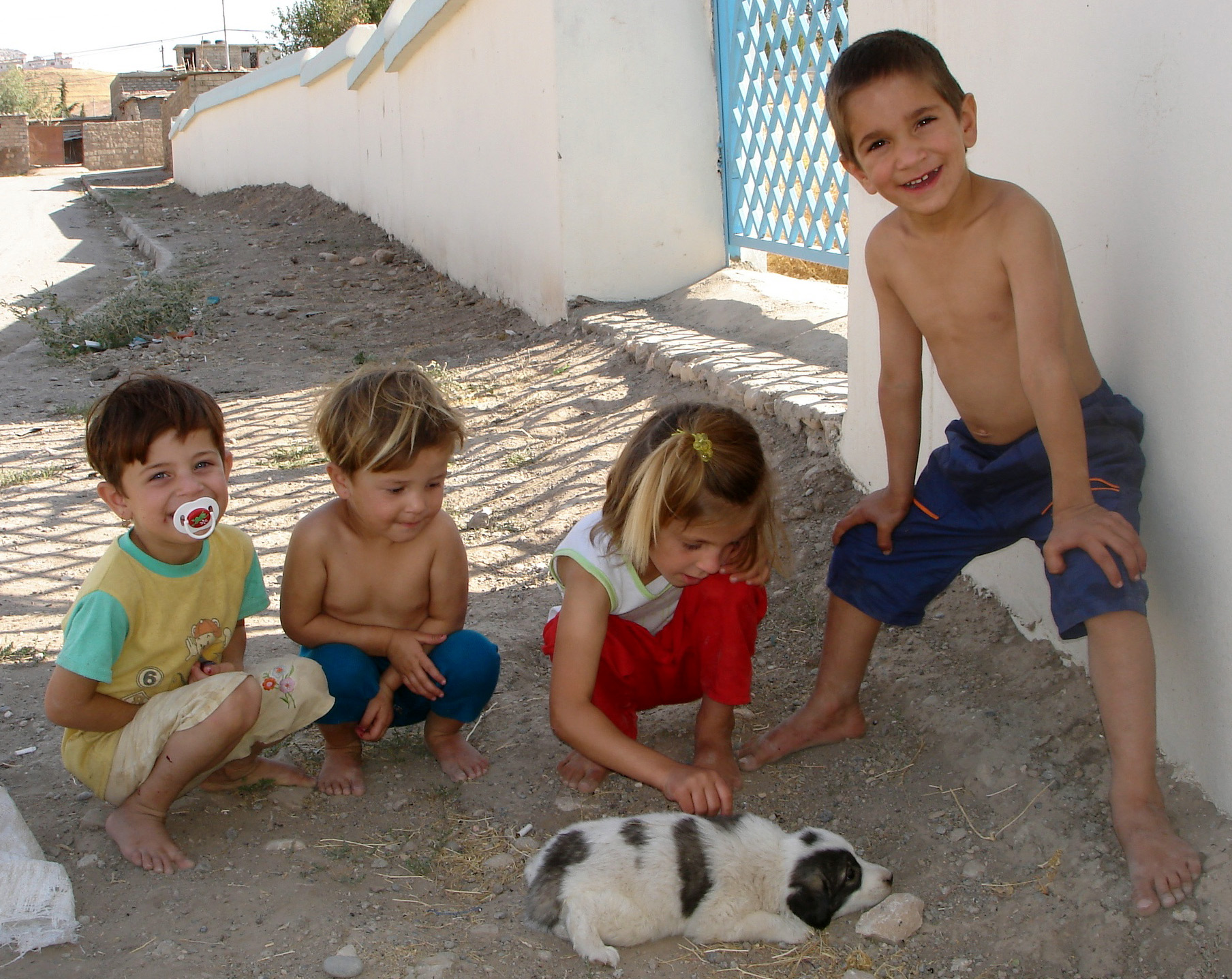
Children in a village near the city of Sulaymaniyah

The main languages spoken in Iraq are Mesopotamian Arabic and Kurdish, followed by the Iraqi Turkmen/Turkoman dialect of Turkish, and the Neo-Aramaic languages (namely Sureth). Arabic and Kurdish are written with versions of the Arabic script. Since 2005, the Turkmen/Turkoman have switched from the Arabic script to the Turkish alphabet. In addition, the Neo-Aramaic languages (Sureth) use the Syriac script. Other smaller minority languages include Mandaic, Shabaki, Armenian, Circassian and Persian.

Prior to the invasion in 2003, Arabic was the sole official language. Since the new Constitution of Iraq was approved in 2005, both Arabic and Kurdish are recognised (Article 4) as official languages of Iraq, while three other languages, Turkmen, Syriac and Armenian, are also recognised as minority languages. In addition, any region or province may declare other languages official if a majority of the population approves in a general referendum.

According to the Constitution of Iraq (Article 4): The Arabic language and the Kurdish language are the two official languages of Iraq. The right of Iraqis to educate their children in their mother tongue, such as Turkmen, Syriac, and Armenian shall be guaranteed in government educational institutions in accordance with educational guidelines, or in any other language in private educational institutions.

=== Religion ===
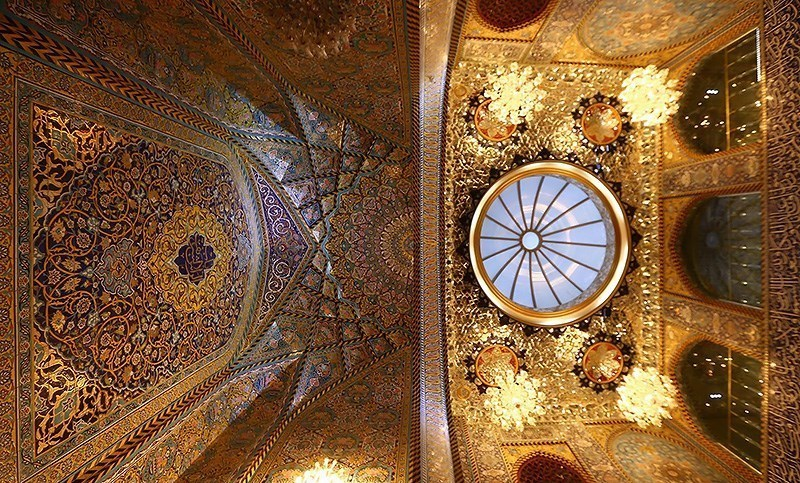
Shrine in Karbala, showing use of Arabesque

Religions in Iraq are dominantly Abrahamic religions. In 2020, the Association of Religion Data Archives (ARDA) estimated that 97% Iraqis followed Islam, with 61% being Shia and 35% Sunni. An older estimate in 2015 by the CIA World Factbook that reported between 90 and 95% of Iraqis followed Islam, with 61–64% being Shia and 29–34% being Sunni. Christianity accounted for 1%, and the rest (1-4%) practiced Yazidism, Mandaeism, and other religions. In 2011, Pew Research estimated that 51% of Muslims in Iraq see themselves as Shia, 42% as Sunni, while 5% as "just a Muslim". Iraq is also home to two of the holiest places among the Shias – Najaf and Karbala. Shia Muslims are mostly concentrated in southern Iraq and in parts of north region and Baghdad. Sunni Muslims are found in the Sunni Triangle region, in cities such as Ramadi, Tikrit and Fallujah, where Sunnis make majority.

Religion in Iraq (ARDA 2020 est.)
1. Shia (61.2%)
2. Sunni (35.3%)
3. Other Muslim (0.84%)
4. Christianity (0.48%)
5. No religion (0.66%)
6. other (1.47%)

Christianity in Iraq has its roots from the conception of the Church of the East in the 5th century AD, predating the existence of Islam in the region of Iraq. Iraqi Christians are predominantly native Assyrians belonging to the Ancient Church of the East, Assyrian Church of the East, Chaldean Catholic Church, Syriac Catholic Church and Syriac Orthodox Church. There is also a significant population of Armenian Christians in Iraq who had fled Turkey during the Armenian genocide. Christians numbered over 1.4 million in 1987 or 8% of the estimated population of 16.3 million and 550,000 in 1947 or 12% of the population of 4.6 millions. After the 2003 invasion of Iraq, violence against Christians rose, with reports of abduction, torture, bombings, and killings. The post-2003 war has displaced much of the remaining Christian community from their homeland as a result of ethnic and religious persecution at the hands of Islamic extremists.

Iraq is home to one of the oldest Jewish communities in the Middle East and the first Jewish diaspora. In 1948, the Jewish population was estimated at 200,000, although some sources suggest the population may have been even higher. After the establishment of Israel in 1948, Jews emigrated, fleeing persecution in Iraq, while 100,000 of them remained. By the time Saddam Hussein came to power, their population had declined to 15,000. Under his rule, the Jewish population declined to very few because the government lifted travel restrictions, allowing Jews to emigrate abroad. At this point, around 1,500 Jews remained. After 2003, fear among the Jewish community increased, leading to its further decline. Today, it is estimated that only 400 Jews remain in Iraq. Iraq is home to over 250 Jewish sites.

There are also small ethno-religious minority populations of Mandaeans, Shabaks, Yarsan and Yezidis remaining. Prior to 2003 their numbers together may have been 2 million, the majority Yarsan, a non-Islamic religion with roots in pre-Islamic and pre-Christian religion. Yazidis are mostly concentrated around the Sinjar Mountains. Mandaeans live primarily around Baghdad, Fallujah, Basra and Hillah.

Religious freedom in Iraq is limited due to a risk of persecution or violence in case of religious conversion away from Islam.

=== Diaspora and refugees ===
The dispersion of native Iraqis to other countries is known as the Iraqi diaspora. The UN High Commission for Refugees has estimated that nearly two million Iraqis fled the country after the multinational invasion of Iraq in 2003. The UN Refugee agency estimated in 2021 that 1.1 million were displaced within the country. In 2007, the UN said that about 40% of Iraq's middle class was believed to have fled and that most had fled systematic persecution and had no desire to return. Subsequently, the diaspora seemed to be returning, as security improved; the Iraqi government claimed that 46,000 refugees returned to their homes in October 2007 alone.

In 2011, nearly 3 million Iraqis had been displaced, with 1.3 million within Iraq and 1.6 million in neighbouring countries, mainly Jordan and Syria. More than half of Iraqi Christians had fled the country since the US-led invasion. According to official US Citizenship and Immigration Services statistics, 58,811 Iraqis had been granted refugee-status citizenship as of 25 May 2011. After the start of the Syrian Civil War in 2011, numerous Iraqis in Syria returned to their native country. To escape the Syrian civil war, over 252,000 Syrian refugees of varying ethnicities have fled to Iraq since 2012.

=== Health ===
In 2010, spending on healthcare accounted for 6.84% of the country's GDP. In 2008, there were 6.96 physicians and 13.92 nurses per 10,000 inhabitants. The life expectancy at birth was 68.49 years in 2010, or 65.13 years for males and 72.01 years for females. This is down from a peak life expectancy of 71.31 years in 1996. Officially, healthcare is free in Iraq. However, years of wars, conflicts, and instability have left a deep impact of healthcare, just like other sectors of Iraq.

Iraq had developed a centralised free health care system in the 1970s using a hospital based, capital-intensive model of curative care. The country depended on large-scale imports of medicines, medical equipment and even nurses, paid for with oil export income, according to a "Watching Brief" report issued jointly by the UN Children's Fund (UNICEF) and the World Health Organization in July 2003. Unlike other poorer countries, which focused on mass health care using primary care practitioners, Iraq developed a Westernised system of sophisticated hospitals with advanced medical procedures, provided by specialist physicians. The UNICEF/WHO report noted that prior to 1990, 97% of urban dwellers and 71% of the rural population had access to free primary health care; just 2% of hospital beds were privately managed.

In 2024, Mohammed Shia' al-Sudani officially inaugurated Shaab General Hospital, Baghdad's first new general hospital in nearly 40 years. The 246-bed facility, which was a long-delayed project was completed under a collaborative management model, which boasts state-of-the-art infrastructure, with advanced medical equipment, and a full range of healthcare services according to Sudani. Minister of Health Salih Hasnawi highlighted the ministry's accomplishments over the past two years, including the construction of 13 new hospitals, three specialised centres, two burn units, and 25 kidney treatment centres in different governorates, while plans are in place to build 16 new hospitals, each with 100 beds, to be managed by qualified companies. In the same year, the government launched the implementation of a joint operation and management programme for modern hospitals at the newly opened Najaf Teaching Hospital.

=== Education ===
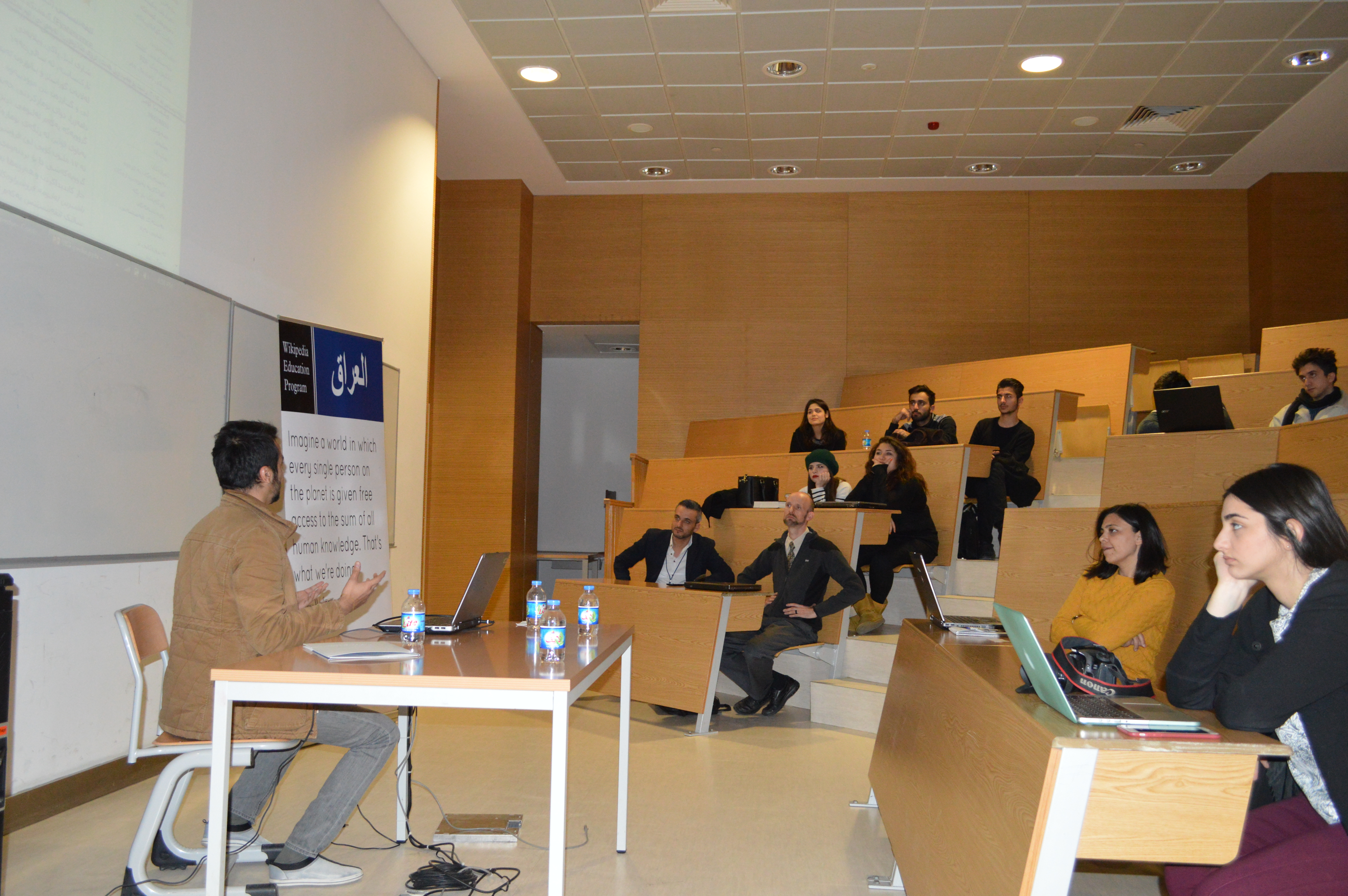
University students in Iraq, 2016

Before 1990 and later 2003, Iraq already had an advanced and successful education system. However, it has now been "de-developing" in its educational success. During his rule, Saddam turned Iraq into a leading centre of higher education. Since the implementation of the MDGs, education has shown improvement in Iraq. Enrollment numbers nearly doubled from 2000 to 2012, reaching six million students. By 2015–2016, around 9.2 million children were attending school, with a steady annual increase of 4.1% in enrollment rates.

However, the rapid increase in primary education students has strained the system. Education receives only 5.7% of government spending, leading to a lack of investment in schools and poor educational rankings in the region. UNICEF found that funding has been wasted, resulting in increasing dropout and repetition rates. Dropout rates range from 1.5% to 2.5%, with girls being affected more due to economic or family reasons. Repetition rates have reached almost 17%, causing a loss of approximately 20% of education funding in 2014–2015.

Regional disparities greatly impact enrollment rates for children in primary education in Iraq. Conflict-ridden areas like Saladin Governorate have seen over 90% of school-age children out of school due to the conversion of schools into shelters or military bases. Limited resources strain the education system, hindering access to education. However, efforts have been made to reopen closed schools, with success seen in Mosul, where over 380,000 children are back in school. Access to education varies depending on location, and there are disparities between boys and girls.

In 2024, the government inaugurated 790 new schools across the country, as part of a framework agreement with China to build 1,000 schools. This initiative aims to address overcrowding and the issue of triple shifts in schools, which have been exacerbated by the destruction caused by years of conflict. Many schools have had to operate multiple shifts, sometimes giving students as little as four hours of learning per day, which negatively affects educational outcomes. The school construction project stems from a 2021 agreement between the Iraqi and Chinese governments to build 1,000 schools. Additionally, the Iraqi Prime Minister announced that the Iraq Development Fund will soon collaborate with the private sector to build 400 more schools, addressing the current shortage of over 8,000 schools in the country.

== Culture ==
Iraq's culture has a deep heritage that extends back in time to ancient Mesopotamian culture. Iraq has one of the longest written traditions in the world including architecture, literature, music, dance, painting, weaving, pottery, calligraphy, stonemasonry and metalworking. The culture of Iraq or Mesopotamia is one of the world's oldest cultural histories and is considered one of the most influential cultures in the world.

Mesopotamian legacy went on to influence and shape the civilisations of the Old World in different ways such as inventing writing system, mathematics, time, calendar, astrology and the law code. Iraq is home to diverse ethnic groups that have each contributed in different ways to the country's long and rich heritage. The country is known for its poets, architects, painters and sculptors, who are among the best in the region, some of them being world-class. Iraq is known for producing fine handicrafts, including rugs and carpets.

=== Art ===
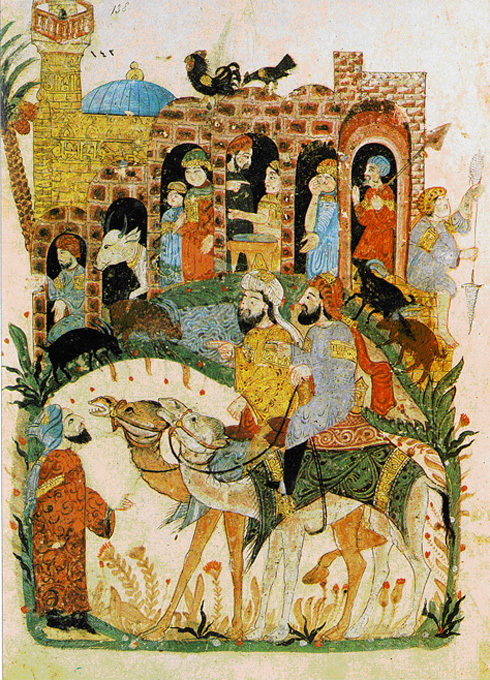
Wasiti's illustrations served as an inspiration for the modern Baghdad art movement in the 20th-century.

There were several interconnected traditions of art in ancient Iraq. The Abbasid Dynasty developed in the Abbasid Caliphate between 750 and 945, primarily in its heartland of Mesopotamia. The Abbasids were influenced mainly by Mesopotamian art traditions and later influenced Persian as well as Central Asian styles. Between the 8th and 13th centuries during the Abbasid period, pottery achieved a high level of sophistication, calligraphy began to be used to decorate the surface of decorative objects and illuminated manuscripts, particularly Q'ranic texts became more complex and stylised. Iraq's first art school was established during this period, allowing artisans and crafts to flourish.

At the height of the Abbasid period, in the late 12th century, a stylistic movement of manuscript illustration and calligraphy emerged. Now known as the Baghdad School, this movement of Islamic art was characterised by representations of everyday life and the use of highly expressive faces rather than the stereotypical characters that had been used in the past.

=== Architecture ===
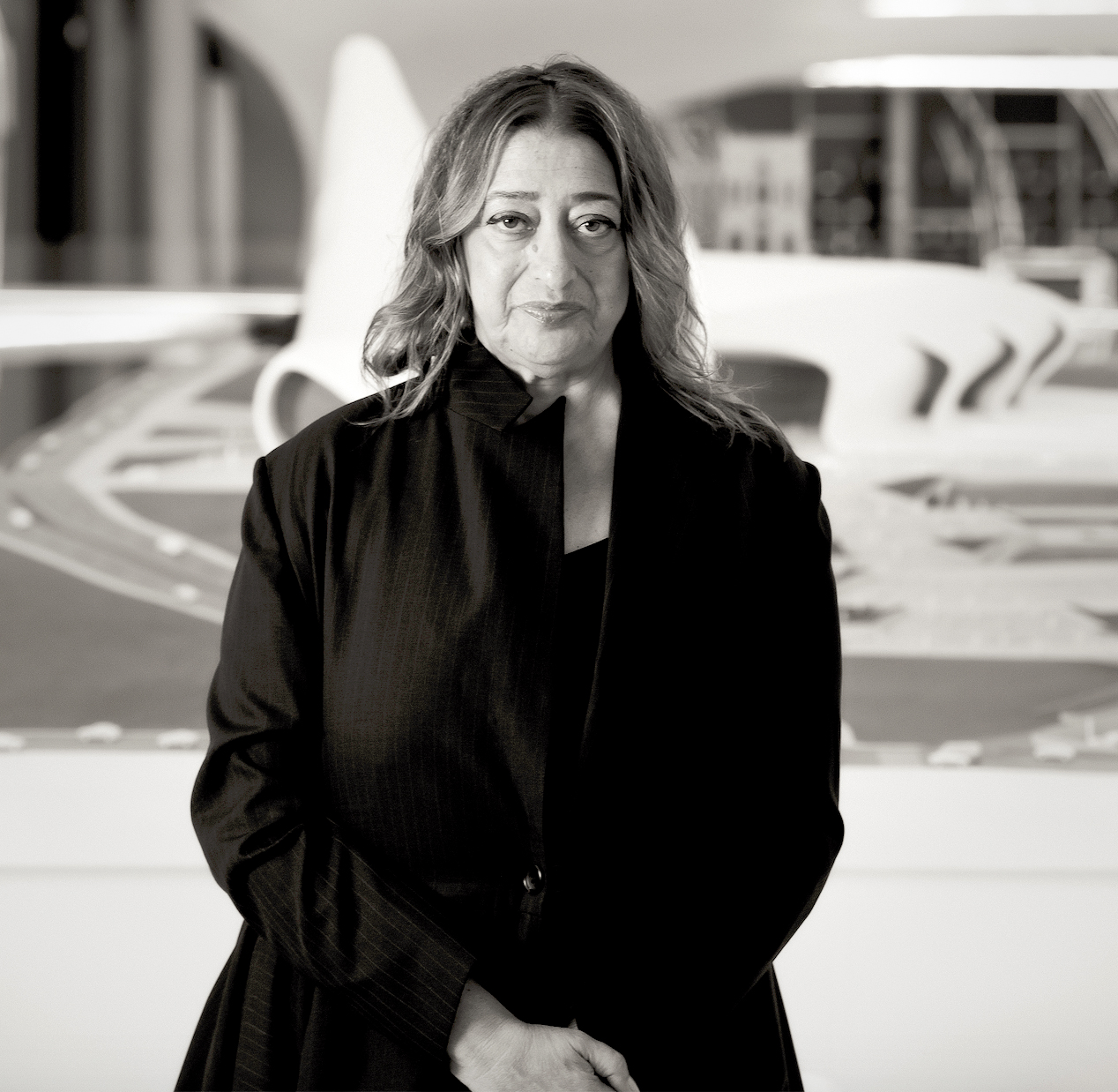
Zaha Hadid (1950–2016), an acclaimed architect

The architecture of Iraq has a long history, encompassing several distinct cultures and spanning a period from the 10th millennium BC and features both the Mesopotamian and Abbasid architecture. Baghdad and Mosul have plethora of cultural and heritage buildings. There are numerous historic mosques in Baghdad and Basra, old churches in Mosul and synagogues in Baghdad. Modern prominent architects include Zaha Hadid, Basil Bayati, Rifat Chadirji and Hisham N. Ashkouri among others.

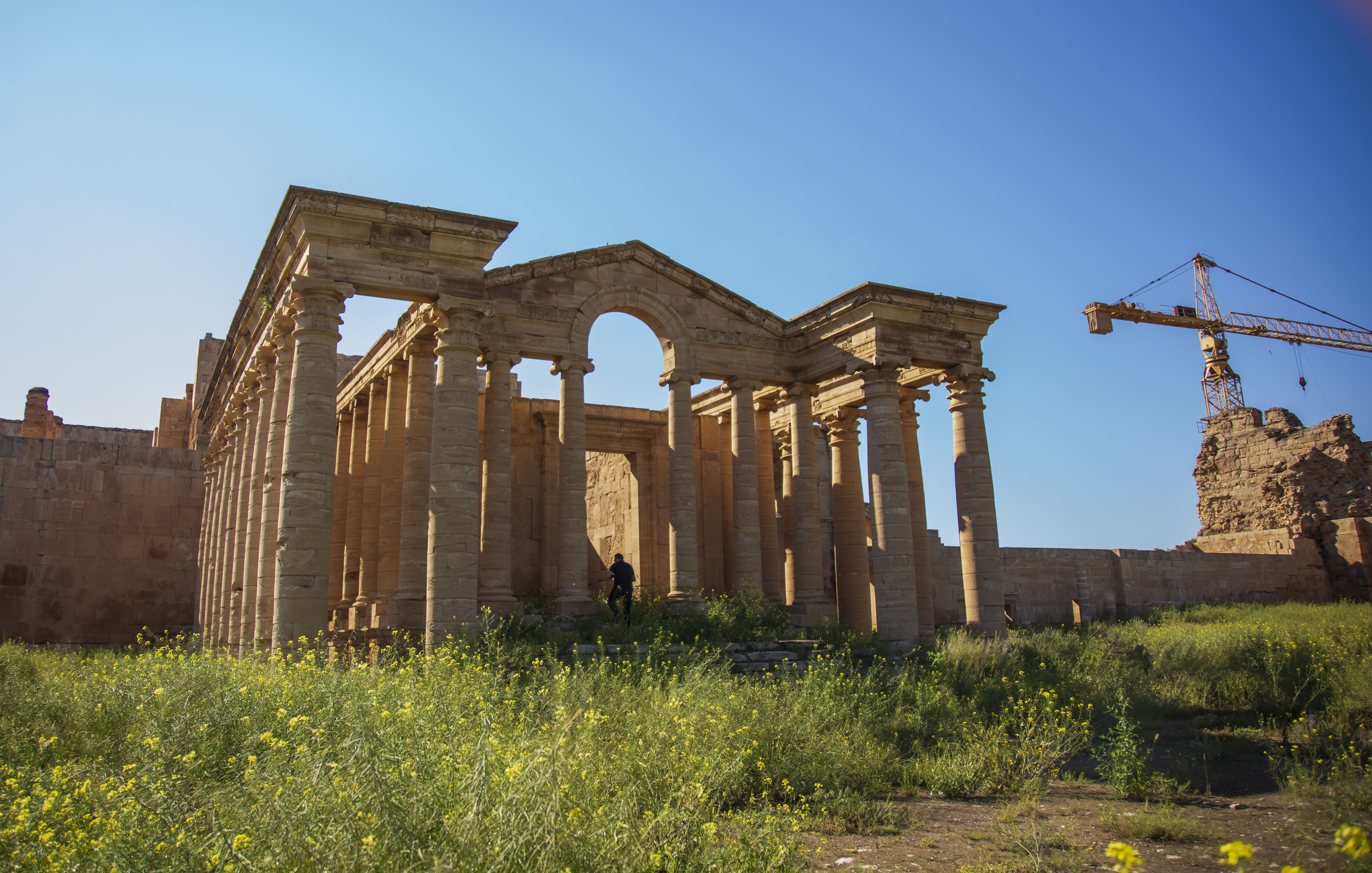
Facade of Temple at Hatra near Mosul was declared World Heritage Site by UNESCO in 1985

The capital, Ninus or Nineveh, was taken by the Medes under Cyaxares, and some 200 years after Xenophon passed over its site, then mere mounds of earth. It remained buried until 1845, when Botta and Layard discovered the ruins of the Assyrian cities. The principal remains are those of Khorsabad, 16 km (10 mi) northeast of Mosul; of Nimroud, supposed to be the ancient Calah; and of Kouyunjik, in all probability the ancient Nineveh. In these cities are found fragments of several great buildings which seem to have been palace-temples. They were constructed chiefly of sun-dried bricks, and all that remains of them is the lower part of the walls, decorated with sculpture and paintings, portions of the pavements, a few indications of the elevation, and some works connected with the drainage.

In recent years, modern buildings include shopping malls and high-rise towers. Iraq was of the first countries along with Egypt, to adopt mall culture in the Arab world and the Middle East. Al-Adil Shopping Center (formerly Ozdi Pak) in Baghdad was the second mall in the region after Egypt.

Important cultural institutions in the capital include the Iraqi National Symphony Orchestra – rehearsals and performances were briefly interrupted during the occupation of Iraq but have since returned to normal. The National Theatre of Iraq was looted during the 2003 invasion, but efforts are underway to restore it. The live theatre scene received a boost during the 1990s when UN sanctions limited the import of foreign films. As many as 30 cinemas were reported to have been converted to live stages, producing a wide range of comedies and dramatic productions.

Institutions offering cultural education in Baghdad include the Academy of Music, Institute of Fine Arts and the Music and Ballet School Baghdad. Baghdad also features a number of museums including the National Museum of Iraq – which houses the world's largest and finest collection of artefacts and relics of Ancient Iraqi civilisations; some of which were stolen during the occupation of Iraq. On 2021, it was announced that Iraq had reclaimed about 17,000 looted artefacts, which was considered to be the biggest repatriation.

=== Literature ===
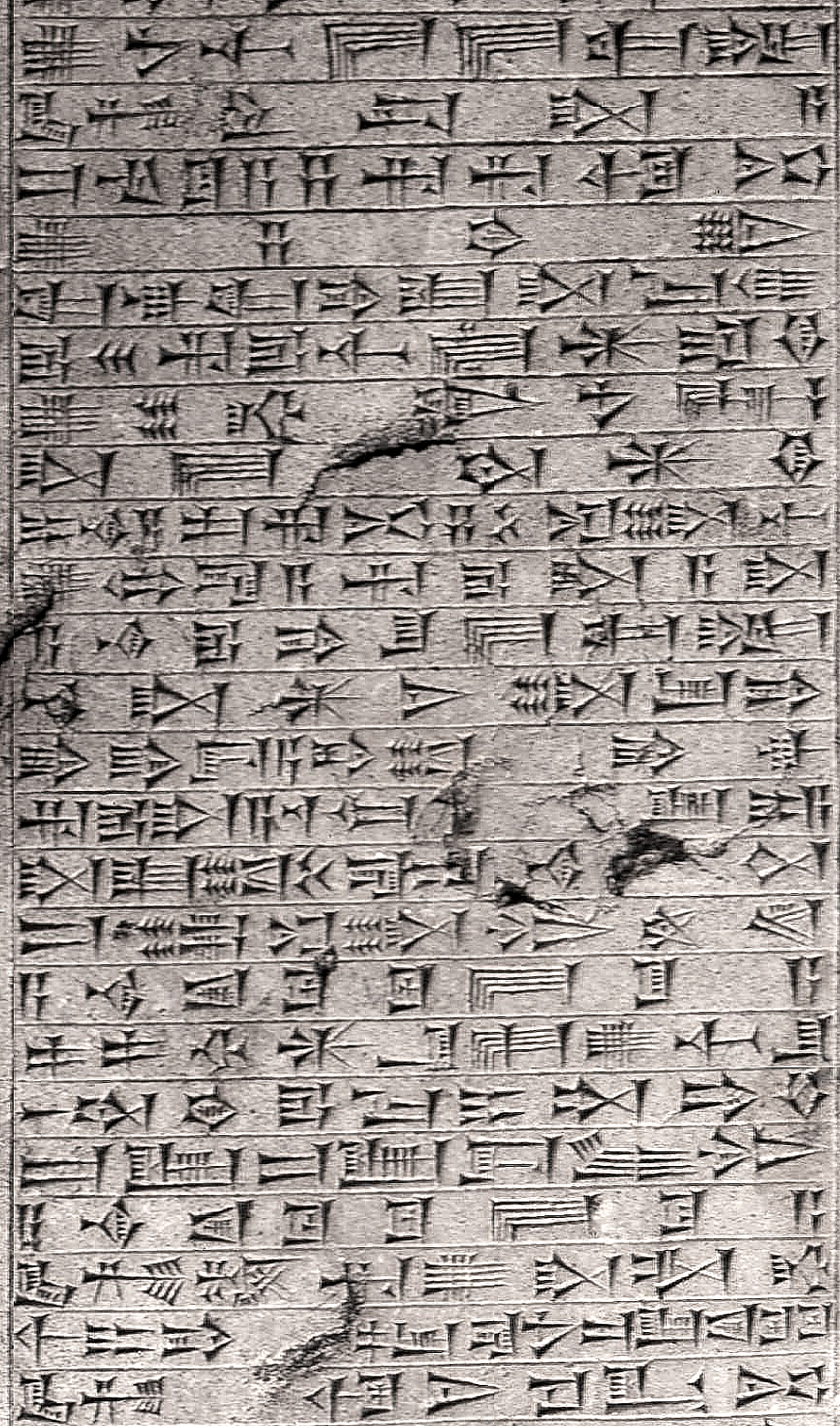
An Akkadian inscription

The literature in Iraq is often referred to as "Mesopotamian literature" due to the flourishing of various civilisations as a result of the mixture of these cultures and has been called Mesopotamian or Babylonian literature in allusion to the geographical territory that such cultures occupied in the Middle East between the banks of the Tigris and Euphrates rivers. The Sumerian literature was unique because it does not belong to any known linguistic root. Its appearance began with symbols of the things denoting it, then it turned with time to the cuneiform line on tablets. The literature during this time were mainly about mythical and epic texts dealing with creation issues, the emergence of the world, the gods, descriptions of the heavens, and the lives of heroes in the wars that broke out between the nomads and the urbanites. They also deal with religious teachings, moral advice, astrology, legislation, and history. One of which was the Epic of Gilgamesh, which is regarded as the earliest surviving notable literature.

During the Abbasid Caliphate, the House of Wisdom in Baghdad, which was a public academy and intellectual fulcrum, hosted numerous scholars and writers. A number of stories in One Thousand and One Nights feature famous Abbasid figures. Iraq has various medieval poets, most remarkably Hariri of Basra, Mutanabbi, Abu Nuwas, and Al-Jahiz. In modern times, various languages are used in Iraqi literature including Arabic, Neo-Aramaic, Kurdish and Turkish, although the Arabic literature remains the most influential literature. Notably poets include Jawahiri, Safa Khulusi and Dunya Mikhail.

=== Music ===
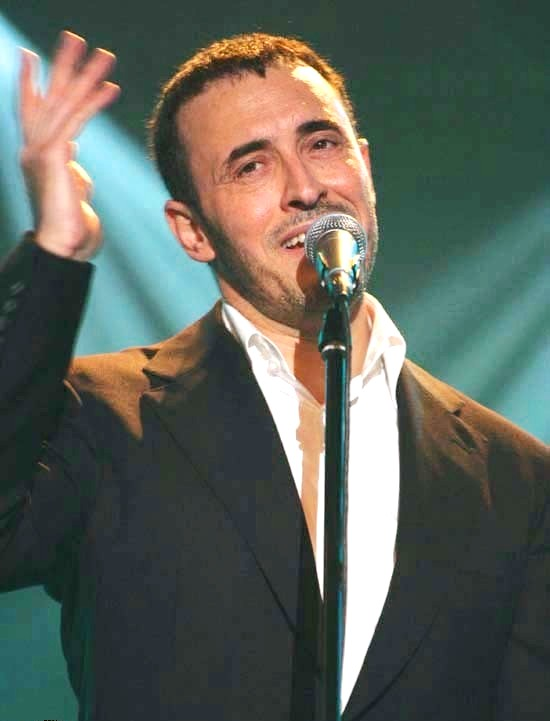
Kadim Al Sahir, known as "The Caesar" of Arabic songs. Considered as one of the most successful singers in the history of the Arab World.

Iraq is known primarily for its rich maqam heritage which has been passed down orally by the masters of the maqam in an unbroken chain of transmission leading up to the present. The Iraqi maqam is considered to be the most noble and perfect form of maqam. Al-maqam al-Iraqi is the collection of sung poems written either in one of the 16 meters of classical Arabic or in Iraqi dialect (Zuhayri). This form of art is recognised by UNESCO as "an intangible heritage of humanity".

Early in the 20th century, many of the most prominent musicians in Iraq were Jewish. In 1936, Iraq Radio was established with an ensemble made up entirely of Jews, with the exception of the percussion player. At the nightclubs of Baghdad, ensembles consisted of oud, qanun and two percussionists, while the same format with a ney and cello were used on the radio.

The most famous singer of the 1930s–1940s was perhaps Salima Pasha (later Salima Murad). The respect and adoration for Pasha were unusual at the time since public performance by women was considered shameful. The most famous early composer from Iraq was Ezra Aharon, an oud player, while the most prominent instrumentalist was Yusuf Za'arur. Za'arus formed the official ensemble for the Iraqi radio station and were responsible for introducing the cello and ney into the traditional ensemble.

=== Media ===
An image showing a page from Iraq newspaper, 5 June 1920

Iraq was home to the second television station in the Middle East, which began during the 1950s. As part of a plan to help Iraq modernise, English telecommunications company Pye Limited built and commissioned a television broadcast station in the capital city of Baghdad.

After the end of the full state control in 2003, there was a period of significant growth in the broadcast media in Iraq. By 2003, according to a BBC report, there were 20 radio stations from 0.15 to 17 television stations owned by Iraqis, and 200 Iraqi newspapers owned and operated.

Iraqi media expert and author of a number of reports on this subject, Ibrahim Al Marashi, identifies four stages of the US invasion of Iraq in 2003 where they had been taking the steps that have significant effects on the way for the later of the Iraqi media since then. Stages are: pre-invasion preparation, and the war and the actual choice of targets, the first post-war period, and a growing insurgency and hand over power to the Iraqi Interim Government (IIG) and Prime Minister Iyad Allawi.

The Iraqi cinema is popular for making Arabic and Kurdish movies. Some of the popular Iraqi-Arabic movies are Another Day (1979), Al Qadisiyya (1981), Clash of Loyalties (1983), Ahlam (2006), Son of Babylon (2010), The Journey (2017), and The President's Cake (2025), while Kurdish movies include Jiyan (2001), Turtles Can Fly (2004), Bekas (2012), El clásico (2015), and Where Is Gilgamesh? (2024)

=== Cuisine ===
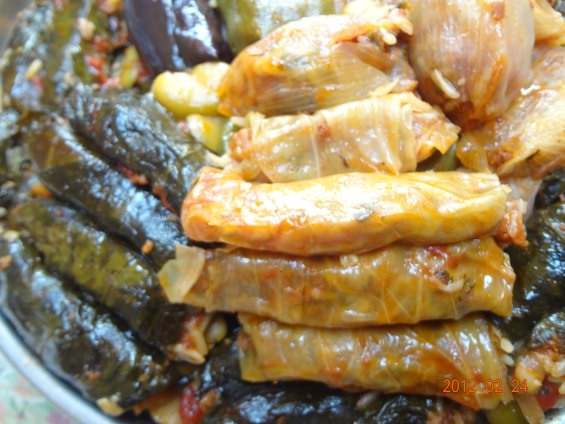
Dolma, a popular Iraqi dish

Iraqi cuisine can be traced back some 10,000 years – to the Sumerians, Akkadians, Babylonians, Assyrians and Ancient Persians. Tablets found in ancient ruins in Iraq show recipes prepared in the temples during religious festivals – the first cookbooks in the world. Ancient Iraq, or Mesopotamia, was home to many sophisticated and highly advanced civilisations, in all fields of knowledge – including the culinary arts. However, it was in the medieval era when Baghdad was the capital of the Abbasid Caliphate that the Iraqi kitchen reached its zenith. Today the cuisine of Iraq reflects this rich inheritance as well as strong influences from the culinary traditions of neighbouring Turkey, Iran and the Greater Syria area.

Some characteristic ingredients of Iraqi cuisine include – vegetables such as aubergine, tomato, okra, onion, potato, courgette, garlic, peppers and chilli, cereals such as rice, bulgur wheat and barley, pulses and legumes such as lentils, chickpeas and cannellini, fruits such as dates, raisins, apricots, figs, grapes, melon, pomegranate and citrus fruits, especially lemon and lime.

Similarly with other countries of Western Asia, chicken and especially lamb are the favourite meats. Most dishes are served with rice – usually Basmati, grown in the marshes of southern Iraq. Bulgur wheat is used in many dishes, having been a staple in the country since the days of the Ancient Assyrians.

=== Sport ===
Basra International Stadium

Football is the most popular sport in Iraq. Basketball, swimming, weightlifting, bodybuilding, boxing, kick boxing and tennis are also popular sports.

The Iraq Football Association is the governing body of football in Iraq, controlling the Iraq national football team and the Iraq Stars League. It was founded in 1948, and has been a member of FIFA since 1950 and the Asian Football Confederation since 1971. Iraq were champions of the 2007 AFC Asian Cup, and they participated in the 1986 FIFA World Cup, the 2009 FIFA Confederations Cup and the 2026 FIFA World Cup.

== See also ==
- Outline of Iraq
