= Petroleum industry in Iraq =

World's fifth largest proven petroleum reserves

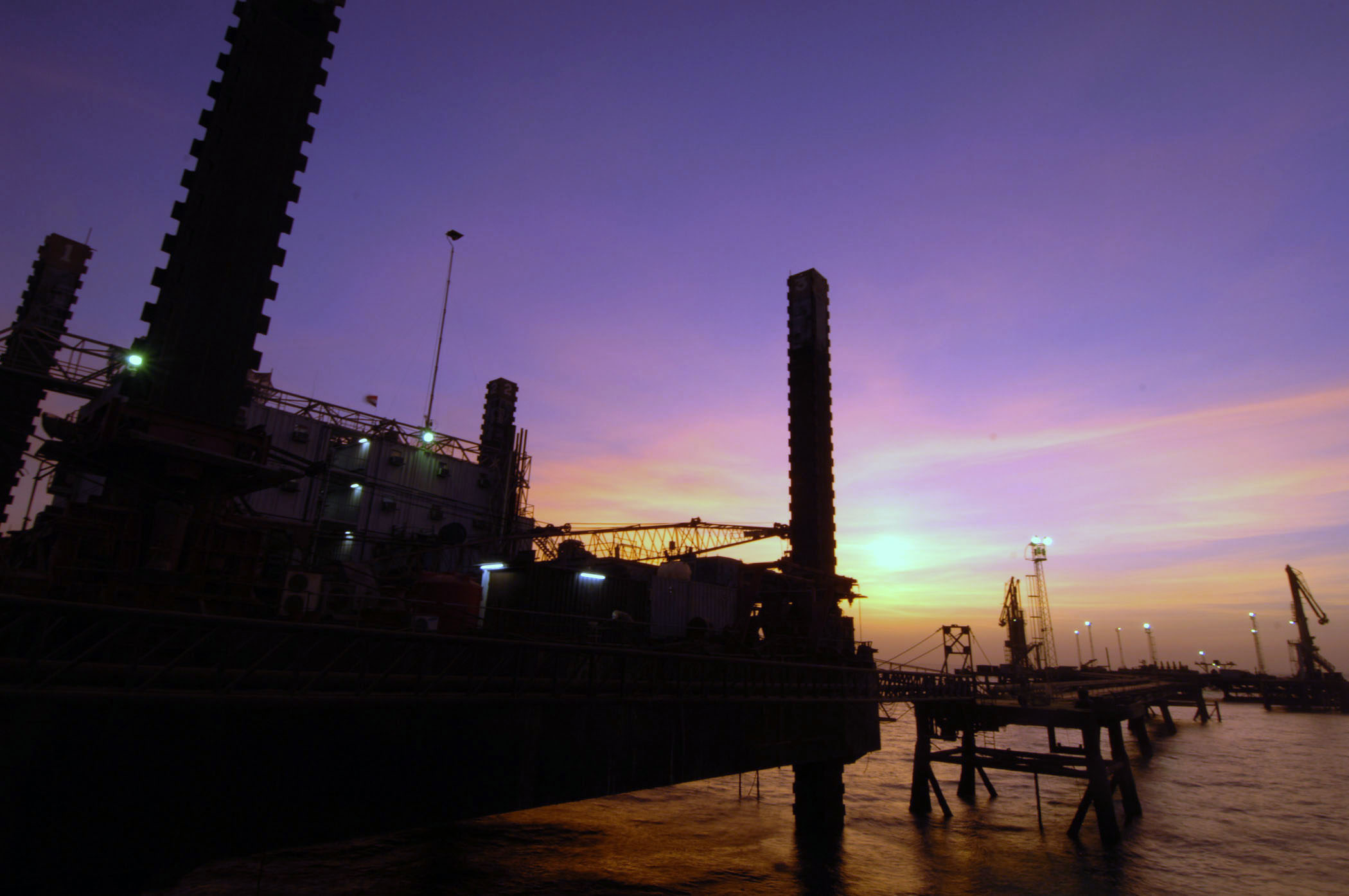
Khawr Al Amaya Oil Terminal

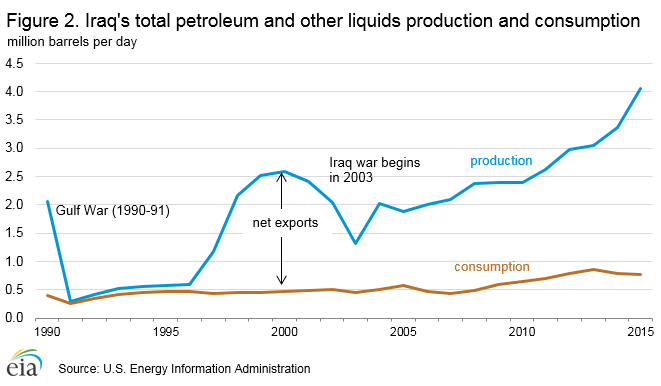
Iraqi oil production has surged after years of disorder.

Historical development of oil production

Iraq was the world's 5th largest oil producer in 2009, and has the world's fifth largest proven petroleum reserves. Just a fraction of Iraq's known fields are in development, and Iraq may be one of the few places left where vast reserves, proven and unknown, have barely been exploited. Iraq's energy sector is heavily based upon oil, with approximately 94 percent of its energy needs met with petroleum. In addition, crude oil export revenues accounted for over two-thirds of GDP in 2009. Iraq's oil sector has suffered over the past several decades from sanctions and wars, and its oil infrastructure is in need of modernization and investment. As of 2010, the United States had allocated over US$2 billion to the Iraqi oil and gas sector to begin this modernization, but ended its direct involvement as of the first quarter of 2008. According to reports by various U.S. government agencies, multilateral institutions and other international organizations, long-term Iraq reconstruction costs could reach $100 billion (US) or higher.

== History ==
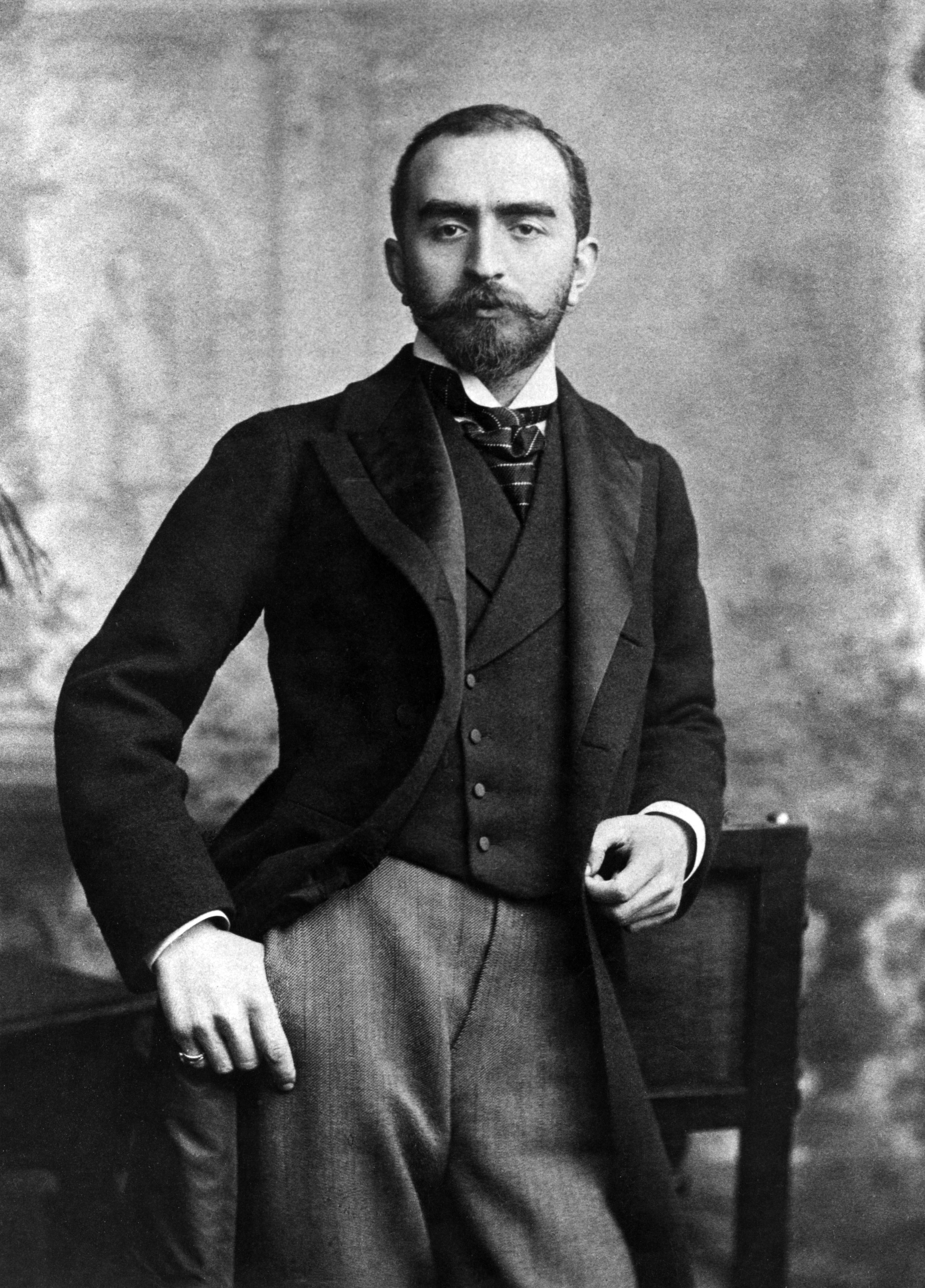
Turkish-born Armenian Calouste Gulbenkian played a major role in making the petroleum reserves of the Middle East available to Western development and is accredited with being the first person to exploit Iraqi oil.

The modern history of oil industry in Iraq is the history of the Iraq Petroleum Company, which was formed in 1912.

During the 20th century the Ottoman Empire granted a concession allowing William Knox D'Arcy to explore oil fields in its territories which, after the dissolution of the Ottoman Empire, became the modern countries of Turkey and Iraq. Eventually D'Arcy and other European partners founded the Turkish Petroleum Company (TPC) in 1912, which was renamed the Iraqi Petroleum Company in later years.

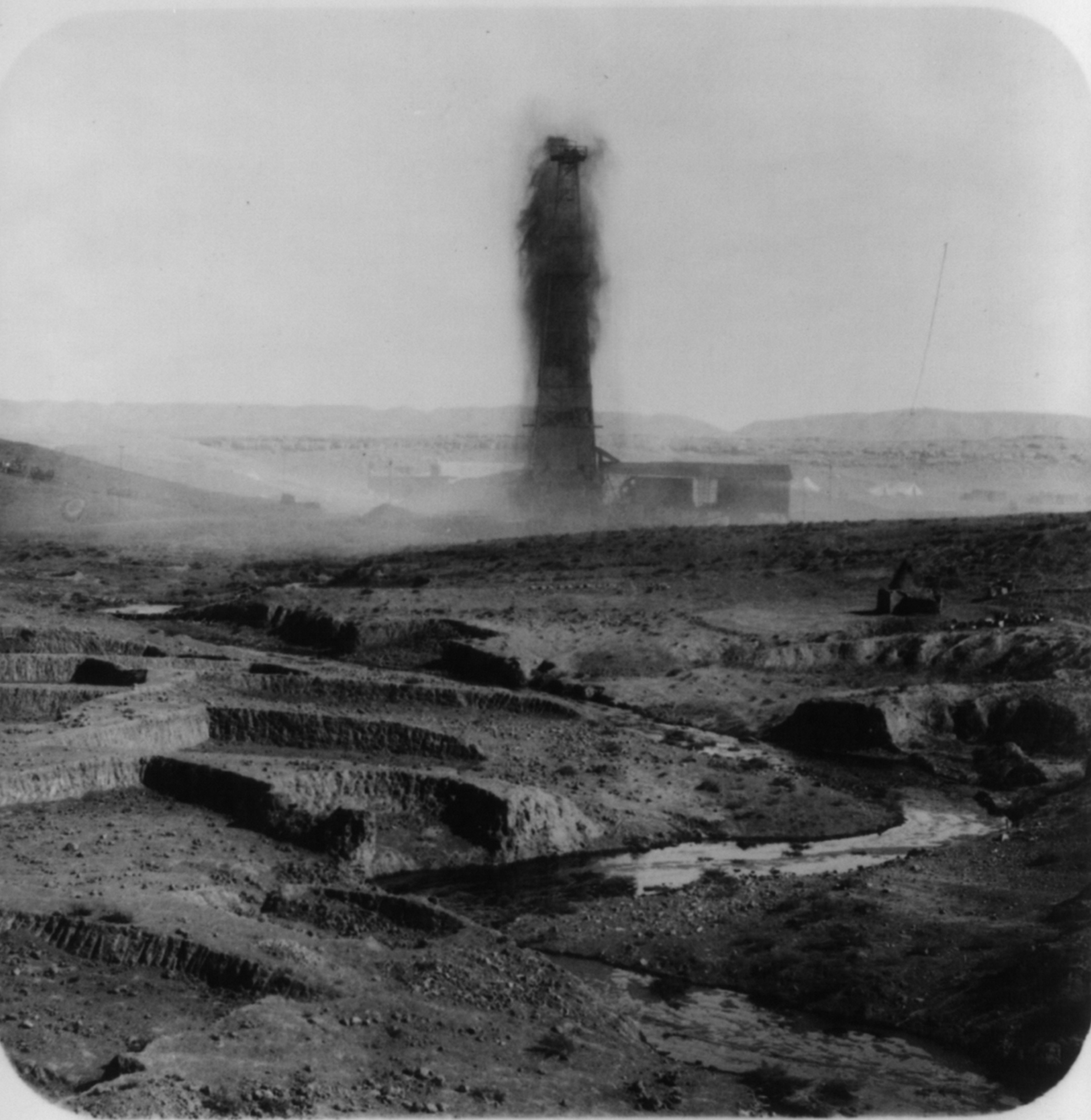
Kirkuk district: an oil gusher spouting with a stream of oil in foreground.

After the partition of the Ottoman Empire, the British gained control of Mosul in 1921. In 1925, TPC obtained a 75-year concession to explore for oil in exchange for a promise that the Iraqi government would receive a royalty for every ton of oil extracted. A well was located at Baba Gurgur just north of Kirkuk. Drilling started, and in the early hours of 14 October 1927 oil was struck. The oil field in Kirkuk proved extensive.

Discovery of oil in Kirkuk hastened the negotiations over the composition of TPC, and on 31 July 1928 shareholders signed a formal partnership agreement to include the Near East Development Corporation (NEDC)—an American consortium of five large US oil companies that included Standard Oil of New Jersey, Standard Oil Company of New York (Socony), Gulf Oil, the Pan-American Petroleum and Transport Company, and Atlantic Richfield Co. (By 1935, only Standard Oil of New Jersey and Standard Oil of New York were left). The agreement was called the Red Line Agreement for the "red line" drawn around the former boundaries of the Ottoman Empire. The Red Line Agreement lasted until 1948 when two of the American partners broke free. During the period, IPC monopolized oil exploration inside the Red Line; excluding Saudi Arabia and Bahrain, where ARAMCO (formed in 1944 by renaming of the Saudi subsidiary of Standard Oil of California (Socal)) and Bahrain Petroleum Company (BAPCO) respectively held controlling position.

After Muhammad Mossadegh nationalized the oil industry in Iran, IPC agreed to accept an "equal profit sharing" arrangement in 1952. Instead of a flat royalty payment, Iraq would be paid 12.5% of the sale price of each barrel. However, foreign company control of Iraq's oil assets was unpopular and in 1958 Abd al-Karim Qasim overthrew Faisal II of Iraq. After seizing control of the Iraqi government, Qasim demanded better terms from IPC but decided against nationalization of Iraq's petroleum assets.

In 1961 Iraq passed Public Law 80 whereby Iraq expropriated 95% of IPC's concessions and the Iraq National Oil Company was created and empowered to develop the assets seized from IPC under Law 80. This arrangement continued in 1970 when the government demanded even more control over IPC, eventually nationalizing IPC after negotiations between the company and the government broke down. By this time the Ba'ath Party was in power in Iraq and Saddam Hussein was its de facto ruler, although Ahmed Hassan al-Bakr did not formally step down as President until 1979.

In February 2007, during the Iraq War, the Iraqi cabinet approved a draft law that would distribute oil revenues to the various regions and provinces of Iraq based on population, and would also give regional oil companies the authority to enter into contractual arrangements directly with foreign companies concerning the exploration and development of oil fields. Iraqis remained divided over provisions allowing regional governments to enter into contracts directly with foreign companies; while strongly supported by Kurds, Sunni Arabs wanted the Oil Ministry to retain signing power. As a compromise the draft law proposed that a new body called the Federal Oil and Gas Council would be created that could, in some circumstances, prevent execution of contracts signed by regional governments.

=== Iraq War and Post-War developments ===
In February 2007, the Iraqi cabinet approved a draft law that would distribute oil revenues to the various regions and provinces of Iraq based on population, and would also give regional oil companies the authority to enter into contractual arrangements directly with foreign companies concerning the exploration and development of oil fields. Iraqis remained divided over provisions allowing regional governments to enter into contracts directly with foreign companies; while strongly supported by Kurds, Sunni Arabs wanted the Oil Ministry to retain signing power. As a compromise the draft law proposed that a new body called the Federal Oil and Gas Council would be created that could, in some circumstances, prevent execution of contracts signed by regional governments. This arrangement would undo the nationalization of the Iraqi oil industry that dates back to 1972.

Under Article I of the 2010 Law of Income Taxation on Foreign Oil Companies Working in Iraq, there is a 35% tax on "income earned in Iraq from the contracts signed with the Foreign Oil Companies, their subsidiaries, branches, or offices and their subcontractors working in Iraq in the field of oil and gas extraction and production and the relevant industries". The production contracts, which foreign oil companies enter into with the Iraqi federal or regional governments, often include revenue-sharing terms as well.

Additionally, in the last few years oil production in Iraq has increased rapidly and seems to be headed in even more of a direction where it will be even more heavily relied on.

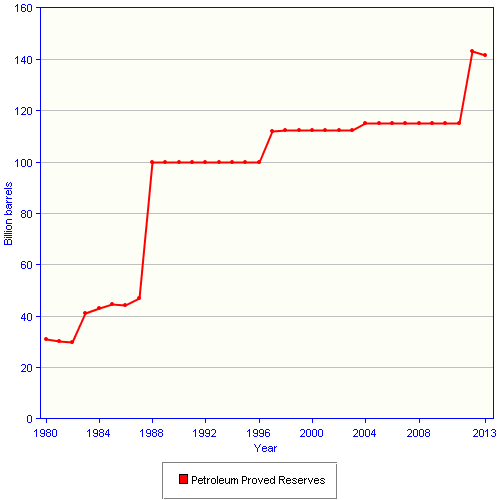
The increase of oil in Iraq up until 2013

== Oil ==
=== Upstream ===
==== Reserves ====
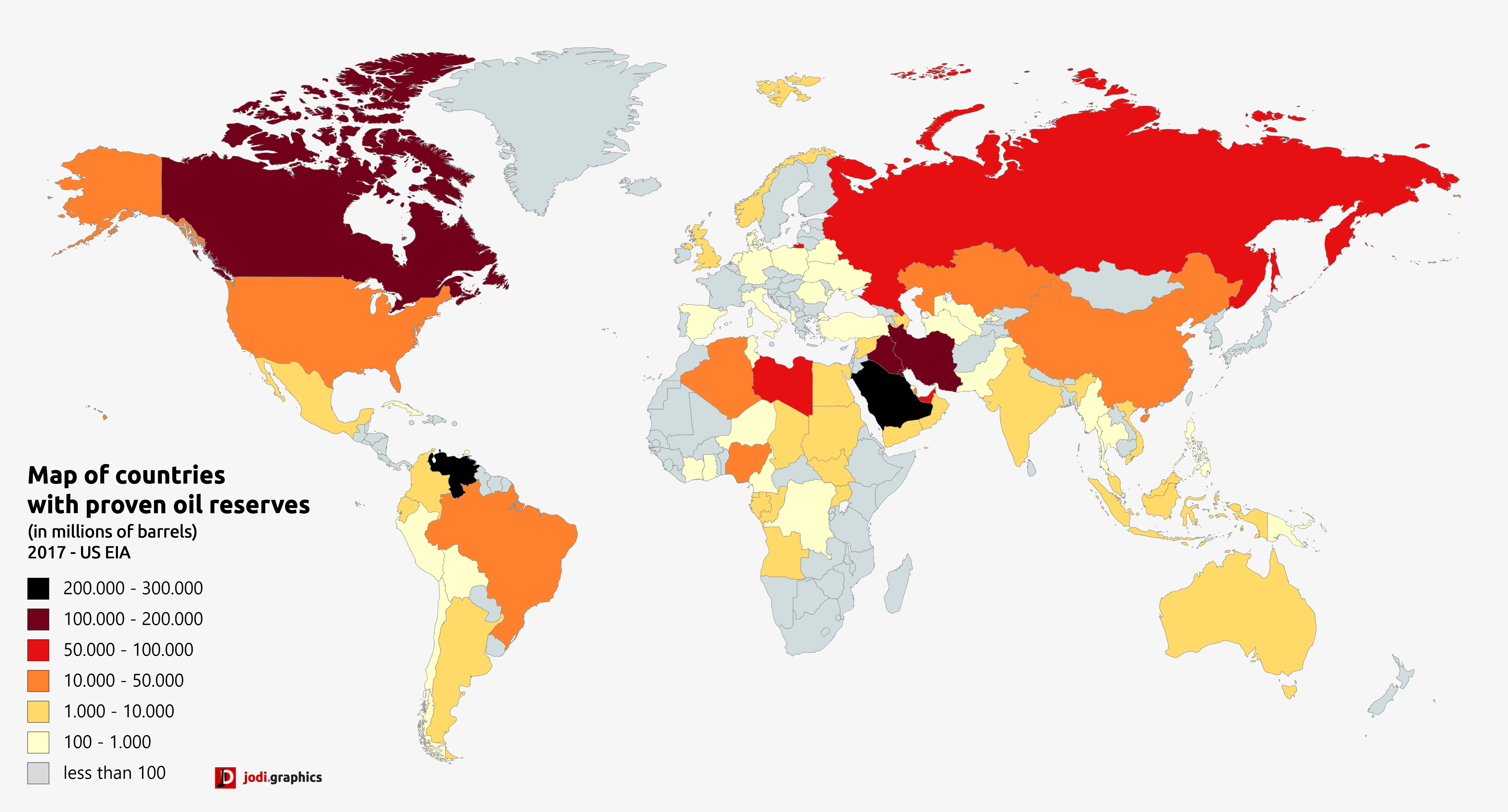
A map of world oil reserves according to U.S. EIA, 2017

According to the Oil and Gas Journal, Iraq's proven oil reserves are 115 billion barrels, although these statistics have not been revised since 2001 and are largely based on 2-D seismic data from nearly three decades ago. Geologists and consultants have estimated that relatively unexplored territory in the western and southern deserts may contain an estimated additional 45 to 100 billion barrels (bbls) of recoverable oil. Iraqi Oil Minister Hussain al-Shahristani said that Iraq is re-evaluating its estimate of proven oil reserves, and expects to revise them upwards. A major challenge to Iraq's development of the oil sector is that resources are not evenly divided across sectarian-demographic lines. Most known hydrocarbon resources are concentrated in the Shiite areas of the south and the ethnically Kurdish north, with few resources in control of the Sunni minority. The majority of the known oil and gas reserves in Iraq form a belt that runs along the eastern edge of the country. Iraq has 9 fields that are considered super giants (over 5 billion bbls) as well as 22 known giant fields (over 1 billion bbls). According to independent consultants, the cluster of super-giant fields of southeastern Iraq forms the largest known concentration of such fields in the world and accounts for 70 to 80 percent of the country's proven oil reserves. An estimated 20 percent of oil reserves are in the north of Iraq, near Kirkuk, Mosul and Khanaqin. Control over rights to reserves is a source of controversy between the ethnic Kurds and other groups in the area.

Oil reserves in Iraq are considered the world's fifth-largest proven oil reserves, with 140 billion barrels.

As a result of military occupation and civil unrest, the official statistics have not been revised since 2001 and are largely based on 2-D seismic data from three decades ago. International geologists and consultants have estimated that unexplored territory may contain vastly larger reserves. The majority of Iraq's proven reserves of oil comes from the following cities: Basra (Being #1), Baghdad (Being #2), Ramadi (Being #3), and finally, Ba'aj (Being the last oil rich city).

A measure of the uncertainty about Iraq's oil reserves is indicated by widely differing estimates. The U.S. Department of Energy (DOE) estimated in 2003 that Iraq had 112 billion barrels (17.8×10^{9} m^{3}). The United States Geological Survey (USGS) in 1995 estimated proven reserves were 78 Gbbl (12.4×10^{9} m^{3}). Iraq's prewar deputy oil minister said that potential reserves might be 300 Gbbl (48×10^{9} m^{3}). The source of the uncertainty is that due to decades of war and unrest, many of Iraq's oil wells are run down and unkept. Repairs to the wells and oil facilities should make far more oil available economically from the same deposits. Iraq may prove to contain the largest extractable deposits of oil in the entire Middle East once these upgrading and facility improvements have advanced.

After more than a decade of sanctions and two Gulf Wars, Iraq's oil infrastructure needs modernization and investment. Despite a large reconstruction effort, the Iraqi oil industry has not been able to meet hydrocarbon production and export targets. The World Bank estimates that an additional $1 billion per year would need to be invested just to maintain current production. Long-term Iraq reconstruction costs could reach $100 billion or higher, of which more than a third will go to the oil, gas and electricity sectors. Another challenge to Iraq's development of the oil sector is that resources are not evenly divided across sectarian lines. Most known resources are in the Shiite areas of the south and the Kurdish areas of the north, with few resources in control of the Sunni Arab population in the center.

In 2006, Iraq's oil production averaged 2.0 million barrels per day (320×10^{3} m^{3}/d), down from around 2.6 Mbbl/d (410×10^{3} m^{3}/d) of production prior to the coalition invasion in 2003. Iraq's reserve to production ratio is 158 years. After the end of the invasion the production increased on a high level, even though there is an invasion from the self-proclaimed Islamic State of Iraq and the Levant the production in March 2016 stood at 4.55 million barrels a day. Which seems to well become a new all-time peak year for Iraq if OPEC talks about freezing or reduce production held in April 2016 will not lead to a reduction. The old peak was 1979 with 171.6 million tons of oil compared to 136.9 million tons produced in 2011 and 152.4 million tons in 2012.

====== Oil extraction contracts awarded ======
On June 30 and December 11, 2009, the Iraqi Ministry of Oil awarded contracts to international oil companies for some of Iraq's many oil fields. The winning oil companies entered joint ventures with the Iraqi Ministry of Oil, and the terms of the awarded contracts include extraction of oil for a fixed gain of $1.40 per barrel for the oil companies with the remainder going to Iraq. The fees will only be paid once a production threshold set by the Iraqi ministry of oil is reached.

Oil fields contracted include the "super-giant" Majnoon Field, Halfaya Field, West Qurna Field and Rumaila Field. The East Baghdad Field, situated in part under Sadr City, did not receive any bids and the Iraqi oil ministry is considering working the field itself. Oil minister Hussein al-Shahristani told Iraqi public television that the increasing oil production "would finance infrastructure projects across Iraq - schools, roads, airports, housing, hospitals".

==== Production ====
In 2009, Iraq's crude oil production averaged 2.4 million barrels per day (mbd), about the same as 2008 levels, and below its pre-war production capacity level of 2.8 million mbd After the end of the US invasion the production increased on a high level, even though a new invasion from the so-called ISIL started. Production in March 2016 stood at 4.55 million barrels a day. Which is a new all-time peak year for Iraq if OPEC talks about freezing or reduce production held in April 2016 will not led to a reduction. The old peak was 1979 with 171.6 million tons of oil compared to 136.9 million tons produced in 2011 and 152.4 million tons in 2012. The company's geographical operation area spans the following governorates: Kirkuk, Nineveh, Erbil, Baghdad, Diyala, and part of Babil to Hilla and Wasit to Kut. The remainder falls under the jurisdiction of the SOC and MOC, and though smaller in geographical size, includes the majority of proven reserves. MOC's oil fields hold an estimated 30 billion barrels of reserves. They include Amarah, Field, Huwaiza, Noor, Rifaee, Dijaila, Kumait and East Rafidain.

A 2012 report by the International Energy Agency estimated that Iraq could increase production from 2.95 mbd in 2012 to 6.1 mbd by 2020, which would increase Iraq's oil revenues to $5 trillion between 2012 and 2035, or around $200 billion per year.

===== Development plans =====
Iraq has begun an ambitious development program to develop its oil fields and to increase its oil production. Passage of the proposed Hydrocarbons Law, which would provide a legal framework for investment in the hydrocarbon sector, remains a main policy objective. Despite the absence of the Hydrocarbons Law, the Ministry of Oil (Iraq) signed 12 long-term contracts between November 2008 and May 2010 with international oil companies to develop 14 oil fields. Under the first phase, companies bid to further develop 6 giant oil fields that were already producing with proven oil reserves of over 43 billion barrels. Phase two contracts were signed to develop oil fields that were already explored but not fully developed or producing commercially. Together, these contracts cover oil fields with proven reserves of over 60 billion barrels, or more than half of Iraq's current proven oil reserves. As a result of these contract awards, Iraq expects to boost production by 200,000 bbl/d by the end of 2010, and to increase production capacity by an additional 400,000 bbl/d by the end of 2011. When these fields are fully developed, they will increase total Iraqi production capacity to almost 12 million bbl/d, or 9.6 million bbl/d above current production levels. The contracts call for Iraq to reach this production target by 2017.

===== Infrastructure constraints =====
Iraq faces many challenges in meeting this timetable. One of the most significant is the lack of an outlet for significant increases in crude oil production. Both Iraqi refining and export infrastructure are currently bottlenecks and need to be upgraded to process much more crude oil. Iraqi oil exports are currently running at near full capacity in the south, while export capacity in the north has been restricted by sabotage, and would need to be expanded in any case to export significantly higher volumes. Production increases of the scale planned will also require substantial increases in natural gas and/or water injection to maintain oil reservoir pressure and boost oil production.

Iraq has associated gas that could be used, but it is currently being flared. Another option is to use water for re-injection, and locally available water is currently being used in the south of Iraq. However, fresh water is an important commodity in the Middle East, and large amounts of seawater will likely have to be pumped in via pipelines that have yet to be built. ExxonMobil has coordinated initial studies at water injection plans for many of the fields under development. According to their estimate, 10–15 million bbl/d of seawater could be necessary for Iraq's expansion plans, at a cost of over $10 billion.

Furthermore, Iraq's oil and gas industry is the largest industrial customer of electricity, with over 10 percent of total demand. Large-scale increases in oil production would also require large increases in power generation. However, Iraq has struggled to keep up with the demand for power, with shortages common across Iraq. Significant upgrades to the electricity sector would be needed to supply additional power. Iraq also plans to sign delineation agreements on shared oil fields with Kuwait and Iran. Iraq would like to set up joint committees with its neighbors on how to share the oil.

According to the Oil and Gas Journal, Iraq's proven natural gas reserves are 112 trillion cubic feet (Tcf), the tenth largest in the world. An estimated 70 percent of these lie in Basra governorate in the south of Iraq. Probable Iraqi reserves have been estimated at 275–300 Tcf, and work is currently underway by several IOCs and independents to accurately update hydrocarbon reserve numbers. Two-thirds of Iraq's natural gas resources are associated with oil fields including, Kirkuk, as well as the southern Nahr Bin) Umar, Majnoon, Halfaya, Nassiriya, the Rumaila fields, West Al-Qurnah, and Zubair. Just under 20 percent of known gas reserves are non-associated; around 10 percent is salt dome gas. The majority of non-associated reserves are concentrated in several fields in the North including: Ajil, Bai Hassan, Jambur, Chemchemal, Kor Mor, Khashem al-Ahmar, and Khashem al-Ahmar.

===== Service contracts licensing results =====
Field / block	Company	Home country	Company type	Share in field	Plateau production target (bpd)	Service fee per bbl ($)	Gross revenue at plateau ($/yr)
Majnoon	Shell	UK	Public	45%	1,800,000	1.39	410,953,500
Majnoon	Petronas	Malaysia	State	30%	1,800,000	1.39	273,969,000
Halfaya	CNPC	China	State	37.5%	535,000	1.4	102,519,375
Halfaya	Petronas	Malaysia	State	18.75%	535,000	1.4	51,259,688
Halfaya	Total	France	Public	18.75%	535,000	1.4	51,259,688
Rumaila	BP	UK	Public	37.5%	2,850,000	2	780,187,500
Rumaila	CNPC	China	State	37.5%	2,850,000	2	780,187,500
Zubair	KPRRM	UK	Public	18.81%	1,200,000	2	183,415,300
Zubair	ENI	Italy	Public	37.81%	1,200,000	2	287,415,600
Zubair	Occidental	US	Public	23.44%	1,200,000	2	205,334,400
Zubair	KOGAS	Korea	State	18.75%	1,200,000	2	164,250,000
West Qurna Field Phase 2	Lukoil	Russia	Public	75%	1,800,000	1.15	566,662,500
Badra	Gazprom	Russia	State	30%	170,000	5.5	102,382,500
Badra	Petronas	Malaysia	State	15%	170,000	5.5	51,191,250
Badra	KOGAS	Korea	State	22.5%	170,000	5.5	76,786,875
Badra	TPAO	Turkey	State	7.5%	170,000	5.5	25,595,625
West Qurna Field Phase 1	Exxon	US	Public	60%	2,325,000	1.9	967,432,500
West Qurna Field Phase 1	Shell	UK	Public	15%	2,325,000	1.9	241,858,125
Qayara	Sonangol	Angola	State	75%	120,000	5	164,250,000
Najmah	Sonangol	Angola	State	75%	110,000	6	180,675,000
Garraf	Petronas	Malaysia	State	40%	230,000	1.49	56,288,475
Garraf	JAPEX	Japan	Public	30%	230,000	1.49	37,525,650
Missan Group	CNOOC	China	State	63.75%	450,000	2.30	240,831,562.5
Missan Group	TPAO	Turkey	State	11.25%	450,000	2.30	42,499,687.5

Notes: 1. Field shares are as a % of the total. The Iraq state retains a 25% share in all fields for which Service Contracts have been awarded.

=== Midstream ===
==== Export pipelines ====
To the North: Iraq has one major crude oil export pipeline, the Kirkuk–Ceyhan Oil Pipeline, which transports oil from the north of Iraq to the Turkish port of Ceyhan. This pipeline has been subject to repeated disruptions this decade, limiting exports from the northern fields. Iraq signed an agreement with Turkey to extend the operation of the 1.6 million bbl/d pipeline, as well as to upgrade its capacity by 1 million bbl/d. In order for this pipeline to reach its design capacity, Iraq would need to receive oil from the south via the Strategic Pipeline, which was designed to allow flows of crude oil from the south of Iraq to go north via Turkey, and vice versa. Iraq has proposed building a new strategic line from Basra to the northern city of Kirkuk, with the line consisting of two additional crude oil pipelines.

To the West: The Kirkuk–Baniyas pipeline (opened 1952) has been closed and the Iraqi portion reported unusable since the 2003 war in Iraq. Discussions were held between Iraqi and Syrian government officials to re-open the pipeline. It had a design capacity of 300,000 bbl/d, on top of the capacity of the existing 12 and 16-inch pipes of the Kirkuk–Haifa oil pipeline, which it looped. The Russian company Stroytransgaz accepted an offer to fix the pipeline in December 2007, but no follow-up was made. Iraq and Syria have discussed building several new pipelines, including a 1.5 million bbl/d pipeline carrying heavy crude oil, and a 1.25 million bbl/d pipeline for carrying light crudes.

To the South: The 1.65 million bbl/d Iraq Pipeline to Saudi Arabia (IPSA) has been closed since 1991 following the Persian Gulf War. There are no plans to reopen this line. Iraq has also held discussions to build a crude oil pipeline from Haditha to Jordan's port of Aqaba.

==== Ports ====
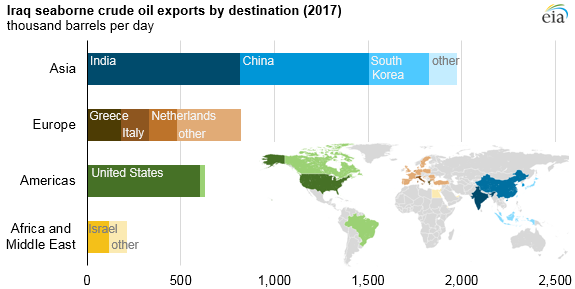
Destination of Iraqi seaborne exports of crude oil in 2017

The Basra Oil Terminal on the Persian Gulf has an effective capacity to load 1.3 million bbl/d and support Very Large Crude Carriers. In February 2009, the South Oil Company commissioned Foster Wheeler to carry out the basic engineering design to rehabilitate and expand capacity of the terminal by building four single point mooring systems with a capacity of 800,000 bbl/d each. According to former Minister of Oil Issam al-Chalabi, it would take at least until 2013 to complete the project if financing is found. There are five smaller ports on the Persian Gulf, all functioning at less than full capacity, including the Khor al-Amaya terminal.

==== Overland export routes ====
Overland routes are used to export limited amounts of crude from small fields bordering Syria. In addition, Iraq has resumed shipping oil to Jordan's Zarqa refinery by road tankers at a rate of 10,000 bbl/d.

=== Downstream ===
Estimates of Iraqi nameplate refining capacity vary, from 637,500 bbl/d according to the Oil and Gas Journal to 790,000 bbl/d according to the Special Inspector General for Iraqi Reconstruction. Iraqi refineries have antiquated infrastructure and only half run at utilization rates of 50 percent or more. Despite improvements in recent years, the sector has not been able to meet domestic demand of about 600,000 bbl/d, and the refineries produce too much heavy fuel oil and not enough other refined products. As a result, Iraq relies on imports for 30 percent of its gasoline and 17 percent of its LPG. To alleviate product shortages, Iraq's 10-year strategic plan for 2008-2017 set a goal of increasing refining capacity to 1.5 million bbl/d, and is seeking $20 billion in investments to achieve this target. Iraq has plans for 4 new refineries, as well as plans for expanding the existing Daura and Basra refineries.

== Natural gas ==
=== Upstream ===
==== Gas production ====
Iraqi natural gas production rose from to 81 (billion) Bcf in 2003 to 522 Bcf in 2008. Some is used as fuel for power generation, and some is re-injected to enhance oil recovery. Over 40 percent of the production in 2008 was flared due to a lack of sufficient infrastructure to utilize it for consumption and export, although Royal Dutch Shell estimated that flaring losses were even greater at 1 Bcf per day. As a result, Iraq's five natural gas processing plants, which can process over 773 billion cubic feet per year, sit mostly idle. To reduce flaring, Iraq has been working on an agreement with Royal Dutch Shell to implement a 25-year project to capture flared gas and provide it for domestic use. Iraq's cabinet gave preliminary approval for the $17 billion deal covering development of 25–30 Tcf of associated natural gas reserves in Basra province through a new joint venture, Basra Gas Company. The agreement, which originally was to cover all of Basra Governorate, has been modified to include only the associated gas from the Rumaila, Zubair, and West Qurna Phase I projects. Implementation of this agreement is necessary for the new oil development projects to go forward.

==== Upstream development ====
Iraq has planned an upstream bidding round in late 2010 for three non-associated natural gas fields with combined reserves of over 7.5 Tcf. This will be the third hydrocarbon bidding round conducted by Iraq, following two earlier rounds that were held to develop Iraq's oil fields. All of the companies that prequalified to bid in the two earlier rounds will be invited. Iraq has committed to purchasing 100 percent of the gas.

In August 2026, Iraq awarded 14 contracts to international companies to develop gas resources, as the government seeks to increase domestic supply, reduce imports and eliminate gas flaring.

=== Midstream ===
Plans to export natural gas remain controversial due to the amount of idle and sub-optimally fired electricity generation capacity in Iraq—much a result of a lack of adequate gas feedstock. Prior to the 1990–1991 Gulf War, Iraq exported natural gas to Kuwait. The gas came from Rumaila through a 105 miles (169 km) pipeline with a capacity of 400 million cubic feet (11 million cubic metres) per day to Kuwait's central processing center at Kuwait. In 2007, the Ministry of Oil announced an agreement to fund a feasibility study on the revival of the mothballed pipeline. Iraq has eyed northern export routes such as the proposed Nabucco pipeline through Turkey to Europe, and in July 2009 Prime Minister Nouri al-Maliki suggested that Iraq could be exporting 530 Bcf per year to Europe by 2015. A second option is the Arab Gas Pipeline (AGP) project. The proposed AGP pipeline would deliver gas from Iraq's Akkas field to Syria and then on to Lebanon and the Turkish border sometime in 2010, and then on to Europe. Other proposals have included building LNG exporting facilities in the Basra region.

== See also ==
- Economy of Iraq
- Energy in Iraq
- Iraq National Oil Company
- South Oil Company
- Missan Oil Company
- Midland Oil Company
- North Oil Company
