= United Kingdom and the Iraqi oil industry =

Iraq's large oil reserves have attracted attention from the United Kingdom, a country with a high demand for (and a low supply of) oil. British involvement in the Iraqi oil industry dates to World War I. Political influence in the region has given the UK the power to establish a number of oil companies in Iraq.

== History ==
In the early twentieth century, use of oil rapidly increased. This was first demonstrated during World War I, when the major powers relied on oil to power newly built naval ships and vehicles. Oil was needed not only for war, but for production in the civilian economy. Britain had to turn elsewhere to address its growing oil needs.

As Kaiser Wilhelm I and the Ottoman sultan struggled to reassert Ottoman dominion over the Sheikhdom of Kuwait, the British viceroy of the colonial government in India entered into an agreement with Sheikh Mubarak Al-Sabah which created a British protectorate in Kuwait. Britain needed a supply of petroleum which was not controlled by contemporary rivals such as Russia, Germany, or the Netherlands. British Admiral John Fisher wanted to replace Britain's coal-burning naval vessels with fuel-burning ships. This shift was crucial for Britain's two-power standard, which held that Britain's navy should have as many ships as the next two largest fleets combined. The new fuel-burning ships would be called dreadnoughts. Since Persia was within Britain's sphere of influence, Britain pursued its interests in the Persian Gulf rather than the United States or Mexico; at the time, Standard Oil controlled 43 percent of the global market. In 1909, after oil was discovered in Iran, William Knox D'Arcy became director of the Anglo-Persian Oil Company; however, concessionary rights in Mosul Vilayet and Baghdad Vilayet continued to be elusive.

Control of their colonial empire allowed Britain to ensure that oil kept flowing into the country. Iraq, from 1918 until its independence in 1931, was known as Mandatory Iraq. Britain controlled the oil-rich territory and began to influence the development of its oil, including a guarantee of an oil-trading deal.

Britain entered into the 1916 Sykes–Picot Agreement, a secret pact with France which defined the countries' spheres of influence in Western Asia. The two countries had agreed to divide the region's fertile areas, and the British realised that they had ceded much of Iraq's oil-potential areas to the French. To secure the oil reserves, British forces captured the city of Mosul; this created a power struggle with France. In 1927, the British began major oil exploration and discovered large oil deposits in the province surrounding Mosul. The United States also began to insert itself into the power struggle due to its goal of securing influence in the region. Growing transatlantic pressure led the British and French to sell some of their consortium stakes to the United States. The British, still the dominant colonial power, secured nearly half of Iraq's oil reserves for themselves. The negotiations took six years, and ended with the July 1928 Red Line Agreement.

Later in the century, Iraq was one of the five founding members of the Organization of Petroleum Exporting Countries (OPEC) and began nationalising its oil fields in 1961. After the nationalisation of its oil, Iraq created the Iraq National Oil Company. In 1976, after the nationalisation of its oil industry, Iraq established a Ministry of Oil. The ministry was tasked with planning and creating petroleum infrastructure, and established oil companies. Iraq increased its oil production; it was the third largest oil-producing country in the world in 1979, with an output of four million barrels per day. Increasing oil production lead to the establishment of an Iraqi petroleum company which was shared by Shell, British Petroleum and Mobil, and Exxon. The company had a monopoly on Iraq's oil production.

== Role of oil in Iraq ==
Oil, as a natural resource and a commodity, can be identified as a contributor to war. In the Gulf and Iraq Wars, oil and its flow to other countries were factors considered by Iraq and the other countries involved in the conflict. Although political changes, economic sanctions, and war created instability in Iraq's oil production, its production could still affect future oil trends. According to senior British Army official in Iraq James Ellery, "Iraq holds the key to stability in the region, due to its relatively large, consuming population," possessing "the second-largest reserve of oil – under-exploited", and its geostrategic location "on the routes between Asia, Europe, Arabia and North Africa ... the Silk Road."

At the beginning of the ongoing Iraq conflict, the country's oil-production capability reached 2.5 to 2.7 million barrels per day (b/d). The estimate dropped to 1.5 million b/d in 2003 and climbed back to 2.06 million b/d in early 2006. Current Iraqi production capacity is estimated by the International Energy Agency (IEA) at below five million b/d. This figure is expected to rise to 6.5 million b/d by 2022, since Baghdad and the oil companies have agreed to boost crude-oil production in the country.

=== Economic interests and implications ===
Crude oil, one of the Iraqi government's most important revenue sources, will continue to be valued for the foreseeable future due to the country's lack of diversification options. According to the World Bank, more than 65 percent of Iraq's 2016 GDP derived from the oil sector. Ninety percent of the Iraqi government's 2016 revenue came from oil, which makes up nearly all of Iraq's exports. Although oil investment has recently increased, the government needs to cut expenditures due to falling oil prices (a 63-percent drop between 2014 and 2016) and is focusing on non-oil investments.

Iraq's dependence on crude oil has had negative implications for the country and has made it a focus of international discussion. This was demonstrated in the 2016 OPEC production-cut deal, in which all 14 members of the organisation agreed to cut oil production to 32.5 million b/d to stabilise the drop in oil prices, giving rise to further discussions of Iraq's dependence on oil. Iraqi oil minister Jabbar Alluaibi said in a 2016 interview that his country's crude-oil reserves are larger than forecast, with previous estimates of 143 billion barrels expanded to 153 billion barrels. If this proves true, Iraq would have the world's largest oil reserves.

== Corporate interests after 2003 ==
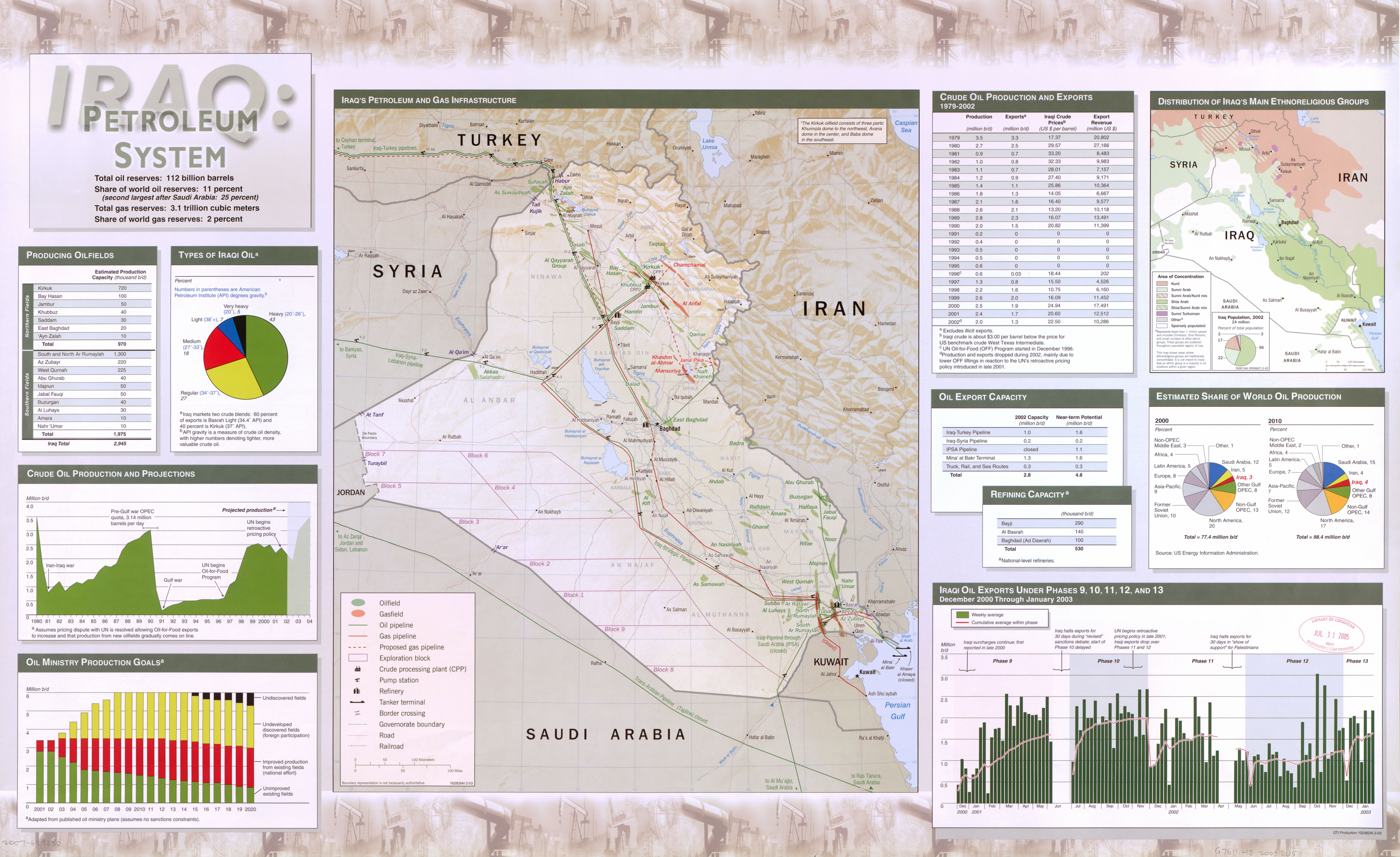
Iraq's petroleum and gas infrastructure

The Iraq conflict, which began with the 2003 invasion, has had significant effects on the country's oil situation. Iraq and its oil industry suffered from the wars and sanctions, increasing the need for international cooperation and investment. Operations of the most prominent British oil companies, BP and Royal Dutch Shell, in the Kirkuk and Rumaila regions were also affected by the conflict and have evolved.

=== Kirkuk ===
The Kirkuk oil field, in northern Iraq near Kirkuk, is over 100 kilometers long and up to four kilometers wide and has estimated reserves of about nine billion barrels of oil. It is one of Iraq's largest. Due to the conflict between the Kurdistan Regional Government and Baghdad, oil from the Kirkuk field has been a contested issue. After the Kurdish Peshmerga seized control of Kirkuk and its oil field in 2014, the central government re-occupied the region in October 2017 after the Peshmerga ignored an Iraqi deadline to withdraw from the area. Although the Iraqi-owned North Oil Company has taken over production in the Kirkuk oil field, the Kurdistan Regional Government continues to control of northern parts of the field.

In early 2018, the Iraqi government and BP signed a memorandum of understanding with the goal to increase production output of Kirkuk to an aspired level of 750,000 barrels/day. BP announced that the company will provide technological support and expertise to develop the field. In late February 2018, the Iraqi government and the Kurdish Regional Government reached an agreement about the production and exporting of oil from Kirkuk. On 7 May 2018, Oil Minister Jabar al-Luaibi said that BP signed an agreement with Iraq's North Oil Company in the southern Iraqi city of Basra to raise production capacity from six fields in the Kirkuk region to a total of more than 1 million bpd.

=== Rumaila ===
The Rumaila oil field is in the southern Basra region, near the border with Kuwait. Thirty-eight kilometers long and 12 kilometers wide, it contains an estimated 17.7 billion barrels of oil. One of the world's largest oil fields, Rumaila accounts for about one-third of Iraq's oil production. In 2009, BP was subcontracted to develop 38 percent of the field. Developed by BP and Chinese partner CNPC, Rumaila generates 1.45 million b/d. According to Rumaila director Mohammed Hassan, "Our plan for 2018 is to boost production by around 50,000 barrels per day after increasing water-injection operations and starting new energy installations at Rumaila".

=== West Qurna-I ===
West Qurna-1, in southern Iraq, has a reserve of about 8.7 billion barrels of oil. In 2009, Shell was granted 15 percent of the field for development. ExxonMobil, which manages West Qurna-1, produces about 405,000 b/d.

=== Majnoon ===
The Majnoon oil field, in southern Iraq, is 60 kilometres (37 mi) long and 15 kilometres (9.3 mi) wide and holds about 13 billion barrels of oil. In 2009, Shell contracted to operate 45 percent of the Majnoon field. Shell was scheduled to cease operations in Majnoon in June 2018 in a handover to the state-owned Basra Oil Company.

=== Iraq Inquiry ===
The Iraq Inquiry, also known as the Chilcot Inquiry, was begun to investigate Britain's participation in the Iraq War. Its report was published in 2016. According to the inquiry, British energy interests played a role in the government's decision-making about the Iraq invasion. According to the report, the war was driven by intelligence that Saddam Hussein presented a risk; however, diplomatic alternatives to contain him had not been exhausted. UK government officials met with BP and Shell officials before and during the invasion to discuss corporate interests and perspectives on Iraqi oil.

On 2 October 2002, director of Middle East and North Africa at the Foreign and Commonwealth Office Edward Chaplin met with Tony Wildig (Shell senior vice-president for new business in the Middle East) to discuss the importance of Iraqi oil for Shell and BP. Baroness Liz Symons, minister of state for trade, met with BP officials Richard Paniguian and Tony Renton and Shell officials on 31 October to discuss their fears of falling behind in Iraqi oil. Symons agreed to address the issue with US representatives, and told BP that a fair share of Iraqi oil and gas should be awarded to British companies due to the UK's alliance with (and commitment to) US plans for regime change. On 4 December, Symons met again with BP officials and was briefed about BP's difficulties and concerns with US policies about future Iraqi oil prospects and planning. On 6 November, Foreign Office Director General for Europe and Economics Michael Arthur met with BP official Richard Paniguian to addressing post-regime-change opportunities for BP.

On 18 March 2003, in the wake of the Iraq invasion, Permanent Under-Secretary at the Foreign and Commonwealth Office Michael Jay and BP Chief Executive John Browne met; Browne expressed BP's readiness to renovate Iraqi oil facilities. Long-term development would be more complex, depending on the post invasion government/situation. A 6 September 2004 internal note between British civil servants addressed economic perspectives and advantages for UK firms in Iraqi energy. When Edward Chaplin met with Ayad Allawi (interim prime minister of Iraq) on 13 December 2004, he raised "BP and Shell's interests" in the Iraqi oil industry.

Journalists Gregg Muttitt and David Whyte criticized the small interest the Iraq Inquiry put into investigating the role British energy and oil interests might have played in the UK decision to join the Iraq invasion in 2003. According to Whyte, the inquiry failed to address "political and economic motivations" other than weapons of mass destruction and was biased.

== See also ==
- Battle of Kirkuk (2017)
- Petroleum industry in Iraq
