= List of oil exploration and production companies =

The following is a list of notable companies in the petroleum industry that are engaged in petroleum exploration and production. The list is in alphabetical order by continent and then by country. This list does not include companies only involved in refining and marketing.

Africa
Company	Country
Naftal	Algeria
Sonatrach	Algeria
Sonangol Group	Angola
Société Nationale des Pétroles du Congo	Congo
Star Africa Commodities & Minerals Limited	Ghana
Egyptian General Petroleum Corporation	Egypt
EGAS	Egypt
Arabian Gulf Oil Company	Libya
National Oil Corporation	Libya
Madagascar Oil	Madagascar
Aiteo	Nigeria
Lekoil Nigeria Limited	Nigeria
Dangote	Nigeria
Nigerian National Petroleum Corporation	Nigeria
Astron Energy	South Africa
EasiGas	South Africa
Engen Petroleum	South Africa
iGas	South Africa
Imvume	South Africa
Gigajoule International	South Africa
PetroSA	South Africa
Sasol	South Africa
Total South Africa	South Africa
Wozani Berg Gasoline	South Africa
Sudapet	Sudan
Tanzania Petroleum Development Corporation	Tanzania
Entreprise Tunisienne d'Activités Pétrolières	Tunisia
Somaliland National oil Company - NOCBBO	Somaliland
Asia
Company	Country
Azerbaijan International Operating Company	Azerbaijan
SOCAR	Azerbaijan
Nobel Oil Group	Azerbaijan
Brunei Shell Petroleum	Brunei
Bahrain Petroleum Company	Bahrain
Petrobangla	Bangladesh
Myanma Oil and Gas Enterprise	Myanmar
China National Offshore Oil Corporation	China
China National Petroleum Corporation	China
CITIC Resources	China
Geo-Jade Petroleum	China
Shaanxi Yanchang Petroleum	China
Sinochem	China
China Petrochemical Corporation	China
Southernpec	China
The Hong Kong and China Gas Company	China
United Energy Group	China
Indian Oil Corporation Limited	India
Oil and Natural Gas Corporation	India
Oil India	India
Bharat Petroleum	India
Hindustan Petroleum	India
Nayara Energy	India
Reliance Industries	India
Cairn India	India
GAIL	India
Gujarat State Petroleum Corporation	India
MedcoEnergi	Indonesia
Pertamina	Indonesia
National Iranian Oil Company	Iran
North Oil Company	Iraq
South Oil Company	Iraq
Missan Oil Company	Iraq
Midland Oil Company	Iraq
Delek	Israel
Isramco	Israel
Modiin Energy	Israel
Eneos	Japan
Inpex	Japan
JAPEX	Japan
KazMunayGas	Kazakhstan
Kuwait Petroleum Corporation	Kuwait
Kuwait Petroleum International (Q8)	Kuwait
Consolidated Contractors Company	Lebanon
Petronas	Malaysia
Petroleum Development Oman	Oman
Oil & Gas Development Company	Pakistan
Pakistan Petroleum	Pakistan
Pakistan Oilfields	Pakistan
Mari Petroleum Company Limited	Pakistan
Petron Corporation	Philippines
Philippine National Oil Company	Philippines
QatarEnergy	Qatar
Saudi Aramco	Saudi Arabia
Singapore Petroleum Company	Singapore
Ceylon Petroleum Corporation	Sri Lanka
Korea National Oil Corporation	South Korea
Korea Gas Corporation	South Korea
CPC Corporation	Taiwan
PTT	Thailand
Thai Oil	Thailand
Timor Gap	Timor Leste
Türkiye Petrolleri Anonim Ortaklığı	Turkey
Çalık Enerji	Turkey
Aladdin Middle East Ltd. ("AME")	Turkey
Abu Dhabi National Oil Company	United Arab Emirates
Emirates National Oil Company	United Arab Emirates
Uzbekneftegaz	Uzbekistan
Petrovietnam	Vietnam
Vietsovpetro	Vietnam
Europe
Company	Country
OMV	Austria
RAG	Austria
Petrol AD	Bulgaria
INA – Industrija Nafte	Croatia
Moravské naftové doly	Czech Republic
Ørsted A/S	Denmark
Atlantic Petroleum	Faroe Islands
Neste	Finland
TotalEnergies	France
Engie	France
Perenco	France
Perenco	United Kingdom
Wintershall DEA	Germany
HelleniQ Energy	Greece
MOL Group	Hungary
Maxol	Ireland
Anonima Petroli Italiana	Italy
Edison	Italy
Eni	Italy
Erg	Italy
Saras S.p.A.	Italy
Ascom Group	Moldova
Makpetrol	North Macedonia
Aker BP	Norway
Bayerngas	Norway
DNO ASA	Norway
Equinor	Norway
InterOil	Norway
Noreco	Norway
Rocksource	Norway
Grupa Lotos	Poland
PGNiG	Poland
PKN Orlen	Poland
Galp Energia	Portugal
Partex Oil and Gas	Portugal
OMV Petrom	Romania
Rompetrol	Romania
Bashneft	Russia
Gazprom	Russia
Itera	Russia
Lukoil	Russia
Novatek	Russia
Rosneft	Russia
Rusneftegaz	Russia
Russneft	Russia
Sakhalin Energy	Russia
Surgutneftegas	Russia
Tatneft	Russia
Naftna Industrija Srbije	Serbia
Moeve	Spain
Repsol	Spain
Lundin Energy	Sweden
Naftogaz	Ukraine
BP	United Kingdom
Cairn Energy	United Kingdom
Centrica	United Kingdom
Dana Petroleum	United Kingdom
Premier Oil	United Kingdom
Regal Petroleum	United Kingdom
Shell	United Kingdom
Tullow Oil	United Kingdom
North America
Company	Country
ARC Resources	Canada
Baytex Energy	Canada
Canadian Natural Resources	Canada
Cenovus Energy	Canada
Crescent Point Energy	Canada
Enbridge	Canada
Enerplus	Canada
First Calgary Petroleums	Canada
Frontera Energy	Canada
Imperial Oil	Canada
Irving Oil	Canada
MEG Energy	Canada
Nalcor Energy	Canada
Obsidian Energy	Canada
Questerre	Canada
Ridgeback Resources	Canada
Suncor Energy	Canada
Syncrude	Canada
ShaMaran Petroleum	Canada
TC Energy	Canada
Vermilion Energy	Canada
Cuba Petróleo Union	Cuba
Uno	Honduras
Pemex	Mexico
Petrotrin	Trinidad and Tobago
Antero Resources	United States
APA Corporation	United States
Berry Corporation	United States
Blacksands Pacific	United States
California Resources Corporation	United States
Chevron Corporation	United States
Chord Energy	United States
CNX Resources	United States
ConocoPhillips	United States
Continental Resources	United States
Devon Energy	United States
Diamondback Energy	United States
EOG Resources	United States
EQT Corporation	United States
Expand Energy	United States
ExxonMobil	United States
Finley Resources	United States
Greka Energy	United States
Hess Corporation	United States
HKN, Inc.	United States
Koch Industries	United States
Laredo Petroleum	United States
Murphy Oil	United States
Occidental Petroleum	United States
Ovintiv	United States
Range Resources	United States
SandRidge Energy	United States
Shell Oil Company	United States
SM Energy	United States
Valero Energy	United States
Vaalco Energy	United States
XTO Energy	United States
Oceania
Company	Country
Australian Worldwide Exploration (AWE)	Australia
BHP	Australia
Origin Energy	Australia
Santos	Australia
Woodside Energy	Australia
Todd Corporation	New Zealand
Oil Search	Papua New Guinea
South America
Company	Country
Bridas Corporation	Argentina
Enarsa	Argentina
YPF	Argentina
YPFB	Bolivia
Dommo Energia	Brazil
Ipiranga	Brazil
Synergy Group	Brazil
Petrobras	Brazil
Empresa Nacional del Petróleo	Chile
Empresas Copec	Chile
Ecopetrol	Colombia
Petroecuador	Ecuador
Petropar	Paraguay
Petroperú	Peru
ANCAP	Uruguay
PDVSA	Venezuela

== See also ==
- List of largest oil and gas companies by revenue
- List of oilfield service companies
