= Az Zubair Field =

Oil field in Iraq

- Location within Iraq
- Country: Iraq
- Offshore/onshore: onshore
- Coordinates: 30.35°N 47.60°E
- Partners: South Oil Company; Missan Oil Company
- Service contractors: Eni; Occidental Petroleum Corporation; Korea Gas Corporation

Field history
- Discovery: 1949

Production
- Current production of oil: 195,000 barrels per day (~9.72×10^{6} t/a)
- Estimated oil in place: 4,500 million barrels (~6.1×10^{8} t)
- Producing formations: Upper Cretaceous Mishrif formation; Lower Cretaceous Zubair formation

The Az Zubair Field (Arabic: حقل الزبير), also known as Az-Zubayr, is an oil field located in southern Iraq, west of Basrah. It is one of the largest fields in the world and was discovered by the Basrah Petroleum Company, an associate (Note: Under the terms of the Red Line Agreement the ownership of the Basrah Petroleum Co. had to be the same as that of the "parent" company) of the Iraq Petroleum Company, in 1949. Zubair was the first field developed by the company on a concession granted in 1938. Commercial production started in December 1951. Oil was delivered via some 70 miles of pipeline to a new loading facility at Al-Faw (Fao). The Zubair field was the third oil field in Iraq to enter production and the first in the south of the country. The even larger Rumaila oil field was discovered in 1953 some 20 miles west of Zubair.

It has 4.5 billion barrels (~6.1×10^{8} t) of proven reserves and currently produces 195 thousand barrels per day (31.0×10^{3} m^{3}/d) but in the next years, under the field's expansion programme, production is expected to reach a plateau level of 1.125 million barrels per day (178.9×10^{3} m^{3}/d).

The development contract has been awarded to a consortium led by Eni (32.81%) with Occidental Petroleum Corporation (23.44%), Korea Gas Corporation (18.75%) and Iraq's state-run Missan Oil Company (25%).

== Cancer-risk ==
Gas, a by-product from the oil-extraction, is burned openly, which produces cancer-linked pollutants. The Iraqi law prohibit gas-burning less than 10 km from people's homes, but BBC found in 2022 gas was being burned as close as 350 meters from people's homes. A leaked report from Ministry of Health (Iraq) blamed air pollution for 20% rise in cancer in Basra between 2015 and 2018. The Iraqi Ministry of Health has banned its employees from speaking about the health damage. Iraqi Environment Minister Jassem al-Falahi later admitted that "pollution from oil production is the main reason for increases in local cancer rates." None of the affected locals have gotten any compensation.

== History ==
The Basra Petroleum Co. won a 75-year concession for the area on November 30, 1938. Prior to World War 2 extensive work had been done in the Amarah area, and was later carried on in the southern part of the concession. Drilling of the No. 1 discovery well began February 14, 1948 and was complete on March 22, 1949.

A detail map of field (including wells), pipe and port was published in the November 1953 issue of The Petroleum Engineer.

Trade of Iraq oil via Fao (x1000 barrels) (Note: Using a factor of 7.6 to convert long tons to barrels)
	1953	1954	1955
...France	5,160	5,996	8,231
...UK	5,062	5,822	1,702
...Italy	3,230	4,773	11,947
...Borneo	2,607	10,518	0
...Indonesia	1,885	2,956	19,388
Total	21,759	33,835	52,805
Total bbl/day	59.614	92.700	144.671
Total via northern route	181,556	187,978	187,690

=== Field ===
By the time commercial exploitation began at the end of 1951, ten wells had been drilled to depth between 10,800 and 11,200 feet, the deepest wells in the Persian Gulf region at the time. Discovery well No. 2 was 10 miles southeast of No. 1 and also struck oil. the remaining 8 wells were completed near No. 1 for the development of production. Six drilling rigs were in operation at the end of 1951 to reach the initial planned 15 wells at the No. 1 site. After which an additional 14 wells were to bring the number at the No. 2 to 15 as well. The average drilling time per well to 11,000 feet was 150 days (85 feet per day per rig assuming a 6-day week). BPC drilled a total of 90,833 feet and completed 7 wells in 1951. In 1952 BPC drilled 109,203 feet and completed 10 wells with 6 in progress and the end of 1952. There were 33 wells completed and 6 underway at the end of 1953. There were 38 wells completed at the end of 1954.

=== Pipeline ===
==== To the port ====
The pipeline pumping station ran on gas from the separator at the No. 1 site and was accompanied by three 120ft by 40ft tanks. Oil was first pumped in November to fill the pipeline. At 700 to 750 psi it could deliver 105,000bpd. Zubair was connected via a 74 mile mixed 12/16-inch pipeline to the port of Al-Faw (the last 10 miles to the port were of 16-inch diameter). The line was built by the Iraq Petroleum Company. The first shipment of Zubair oil from the terminal was made on December 19 or 21, 1951, a total of 33,800 tons was shipped in the last days of 1951 and the field was inaugurated in January 1952. The pipeline extended north-eastwards, met the Shatt al-Arab at Basra and then followed the river on its right bank to Fao, according to a World Oil map.

In the fall of 1952, laying of 65 miles of 24-inch loop line began. South Durham Steel & Iron Co. (UK) provided 15,630 joints weighing 17,614 tons of welded pipe costing $2,520,000 with joint lengths of 26 feet. Zubair was producing at only 40,000bpd at the time construction started, below capacity of the 12-inch line, but the concession stipulated that 160,000bpd had to be reached by 1955 which the old line wouldn't be able to deliver. The 24-inch loop was completed in October 1953. It ran a somewhat more direct route, meeting the Shatt al-Arab due east, bypassing Basrah.

In July 1960 laying of a 65-mile 30/32-inch loop began and was completed during the year. It followed the path of the 24-inch loop line. The pipe contract also covered 250 miles of loop on the Kirkuk-Banias pipeline, where work was interrupted when the conditions were most favorable in the south for laying the pipe; 2000 tons of equipment were moved 500 miles and then back, costing 10 days of overhead on each relocation. The work in the south was done in 60 days.

==== To Rumaila ====
In 1954 a 12-inch line was laid to the Rumaila oil field, 20 miles to the west. Rumaila began commercial production at the end of 1954. During 1957 an 18-mile 16-inch loop was laid between the fields.

At the end of 1960, work was underway to convert the original 12-inch line to a 50-mile gas carrier between Rumaila and Basra.

=== Port ===
The Fao terminal had at the end of 1951 8 tanks of 135,000bbl and 2 loading jetties with 24-inch suction and loading lines connected to a common 12-inch line to the tanks allowing for 1,200 tons/hour through each jetty. At the end of 1953 this increased to 20 tanks of 135,000bbl and 4 jetties (all rated at 2,000 tons/hour) and there were built a powerhouse with 3 x 640kva generators and a 120,000 gallons/day water treatment plant.

On July 4, 1953 the MV Antarctic Tanker with a cargo of 11,563 tons was the 300th ship to load at the port, bringing to total to 3,616,654 tons (average: 12,056 tons).

The field, the headquarters at Makinah and the Fao port were interconnected via an automatic-dial VHF telephone/telegraph system.

Zubair was the third field in Iraq to enter commercial production, after Naft Khana and Kirkuk (1934).
