= Missan Oil Company =

Iraqi state-owned oil and gas company

Coordinates: 31°49′15″N 47°9′43″E

- شركة نفط ميسان

Agency overview
- Headquarters: Amarah, Maysan, Iraq
- Agency executives: Ali Muarej, Director General; Adnan Noshisajrt, Operation division
- Parent agency: Ministry of Oil
- Website: moc.oil.gov.iq

Missan Oil Company (MOC) (Arabic: شركة نفط ميسان) is a state-owned oil and gas company located in the Maysan Governorate, Iraq. The headquarters are located in the capital of the province, Amarah.

Missan was spun off from South Oil Company in 2008 to expand oil activities in Maysan and to set up and oversee joint ventures with international companies to develop the province's oil fields.

The split from South Oil was seen as a political move and aroused international debates.

The Missan oilfields are operated by CNOOC Iraq.

== History ==
Following the spin-off from South Oil in 2008, Missan initiated an international consortium to develop the Zubair oil field. As part of a series of international licensing rounds, the 20-year deal was finalized in 2010, with companies Eni (32.81%), Occidental Petroleum (23.44%) and Korea Gas Corporation (18.75%) holding stakes in the venture. Missan Oil (25%) and its partners announced plans to increase field production from 195,000 barrels per day (31,000 m^{3}/d) to around 1,200,000 barrels per day (190,000 m^{3}/d) and invest around $6.5 billion into the development of the field.

In 2009, as part of the second round of post-war oilfield bidding held by the Iraqi government, South Oil (25%) awarded a major contract to CNPC (37.5%), Total (18.75%), and Petronas (18.75%) to develop the major Halfaya oilfield. After the deal was completed, MOC took over operations and ownership from South Oil, and the final 20-year contract was signed in January 2012.

In 2010, MOC signed technical service contracts with CNPC and CNOOC. In 2011, Missan Oil signed another contract with Shell (45%) and Petronas (30%), to develop the Majnoon oil field in the Basra region.

In 2013, MOC announced the completion of four new production wells in the Halfaya oil field.

The Majnoon oil field operations were given to Basra Oil Company (BOC) in June 2018 after Shell exited.

In October 2023, the gas processing project (GPP) in the Halfaya oil field reached mechanical completion and commissioning began in March 2024. It was inaugurated in June 2024 and it has a production capacity of 300 million standard cubic feet per day.

The MOC signed a contract with KAR Group for the Ad Daimah field during the Fifth-plus licensing round in May 2024.

== Organization ==
Managing Director Ali Muarij was reported to have been removed from the post in June 2011 after being charged with bad administration and failure to achieve higher oil production results during his tenure. However, as of mid-2012 press reports suggested he was still in his post as head of the company.

In 2014, Adnan Noshi was assigned by the Iraqi Oil Ministry as the new head of MOC.

== Operations ==
The Maysan Oil Company (MOC) is responsible for fields in the Maysan province which include six producing fields (Bazergan, Abu-Gharb, Fakka and Halfaya), as well as Majnoon, which it operates in partnership with the South Oil Company. Maysan also holds five discovered but unproducing fields, including the Huweiza, al-Rafi’e, East Rafidan, Dujeila and Kumait fields.

In 2013, production levels stood at around 200,000 barrels per day (32,000 m^{3}/d), with plans to increase to 300,000 barrels per day (48,000 m^{3}/d) by the end of the year. In 2014, production had reached 400,000 barrels per day (64,000 m^{3}/d) and the target of 1,000,000 barrels per day (160,000 m^{3}/d) was set for 2020.

== Operated Oilfields ==
Halfaya oilfield is one of the seven biggest oilfields in Iraq, with proven reserves of around 4.1 billion barrels.

== See also ==
- Iraq oil law (2007)
- North Oil Company
- South Oil Company
