= Rumaila Operating Organization =

Iraq-based petroleum company

Rumaila Operating Organisation (ROO)
- Type: Private
- Industry: Petroleum
- Founded: 2010
- Founder: BP, PetroChina (both now BECL); South Oil Company (now Basra Oil Company); State Oil Marketing Company (SOMO)
- Headquarters: Rumaila oil field
- Website: http://www.rumaila.iq

Rumaila Operating Organisation (ROO) is the operator of the Rumaila oilfield in Iraq, one of the largest in the world. ROO is a joint venture between Basra Oil Company (BOC), Basra Energy Company Limited (BECL) and the State Oil Marketing Organization (SOMO).

== Overview ==
Rumaila Operating Organization was founded by BP, PetroChina, the State Oil Marketing Organization (SOMO) and Basra Oil Company (BOC) (formerly South Oil Company (SOC)) in order to operate the 20-year rehabilitation and expansion of Rumaila oil field in southern Iraq, which was discovered in 1953 and has been in operation since 1954, with extensive exploration and production since the late 1960s / 1970s.

Rumaila oil field is part of the so-called class of super-giant oilfields, with more than one billion barrels of recoverable oil. Current estimations of Rumaila's total reserves lie around 17 billion barrels. Production from the field is around one third of the country's total oil output.

The field is located in Southern Iraq, around 30 miles (50km) from Kuwait's border and played an important role in the 1990 Gulf War, the 2003 Iraq invasion and following the Iraq war.

A new round for bidding of southern oil-fields in Iraq was first announced in 2008, following several years of turmoil due to the war and resulting in political and military unrest.

A Technical Service Contract was signed between BOC, bp, PetroChina and SOMO in 2009, detailing the establishment of ROO, and triggering the introduction of new technologies and infrastructure, training and equipment of staff, and an extensive drilling and expansion program at the Rumaila oilfield. ROO is the operator, Basra Energy Company (BECL) is now the lead contractor. BECL is wholly owned by BP and PetroChina, and owns and manages the companies' interested at the Rumaila oilfield in Iraq.The agreement was extended in 2014 so that it now runs until 2034.

Rumaila Operating Organisation planned to hire mainly local employees to oversee the operations, with a smaller number of technical experts and managers from bp and CNPC. The operations of the company were scheduled to begin in July 2010. Plans by the consortium detailed the spending of more than $15 billion, between 2010 and 2020, to develop the field.

Initial production targets were set to raise the average daily production from 1.06 to 1.2 million barrels per day (bpd) and were reached in December 2010. By 2014, the production consistently ran over 1.3 million bpd and by January 2017 it had reached over 1.4 million bpd. Production since 2010 has increased by over 35%.

Since construction began in 2010, more than 500 new wells have been drilled and 14 degassing stations were renovated, environmentally accessed and land cleaned up. The connecting infrastructure, new roads, maintenance buildings, staff and office buildings were erected around the same time period and a new cluster pump station and power station have also been built. Today the field has around 550 producing wells and 150 injection wells.

bp (38% ownership, headquartered in UK) and PetroChina (37%, China) had earlier signed a contract with SOC (25%, Iraq) in 2009 to develop and increase production at Rumaila field, Iraq's largest. In June 2022, with approval from the Government of Iraq, BECL assumed the lead contractor role at the Rumaila oilfield, under the existing Technical Services Contract to enable continued and optimized investment in the field, including enhanced access to external financing.

Under ROO, the field has produced around 5 billion barrels of oil in total, generating a revenue of around $500 billion.

Around 7,600 Iraqis work at Rumaila, assisted by over 100 experts from bp and PetroChina. Another estimated 35,000 locals are involved in operations at Rumaila through contractors, operating throughout the entire value and supply chain.

In 2021, the milestone of 5.0 billion barrels (790,000,000 m^{3}) of oil was also reached. In April 2025 ROO reported a production of 1,371,000 barrels per day (218,000 m^{3}/d).

== Philanthropy ==
ROO also finances and runs The Rumaila Social Welfare Fund (SWF) and the Rumaila Education Fund (REF), providing different forms of support, training, education, health and infrastructural aids to communities surrounding the Rumaila oilfield.

For several years after 2012 ROO co-operated with the charity organization AMAR to support vulnerable people in the south of Iraq. The first project of this partnership was distributing food packages to over 1.000 families in need during the festival of Ramadan in July 2013. ROO also supports initiatives of emergency relief and health care, and strengthens local communities.
