= Majnoon Island =

Iraqi island

Coordinates: 31°05′03″N 47°27′15″E

Administration
- Iraq

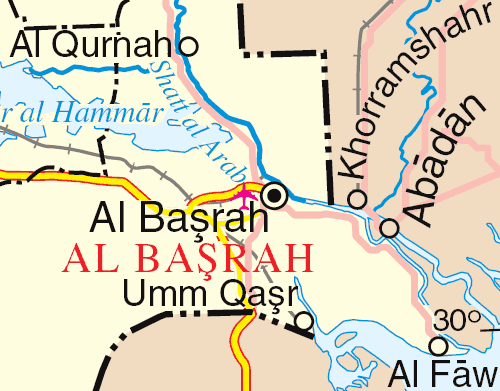

Majnoon Island is an island in southern Iraq near Al-Qurnah that is a center for oil production of the Majnoon Oilfield. The area was built out of sand dunes and mud to create pathways for oil pipelines. It was the site of several large battles in the Iran-Iraq war.

The Majnoon Oilfield was discovered in 1975 by Braspetro (Petrobras of Brazil), Majnoon was found to be a part of Great Rumaila Triangle. Development work stopped in 1980 when Iraq's war with Iran broke out. Iran controlled the oilfield during the war, and it along with the other parts of Iraq, were looted and sabotaged. Before the Gulf War, roughly a sixth of Iraq's oil production, some 7 million barrels (1,100,000 m^{3}), passed through the island. Production quickly recovered after the site was a center of fighting in the Iran–Iraq War, particularly Operation Kheibar in 1984. However, following the imposition of United Nations sanctions and the 2003 Iraq War, production has presently reduced to 46,000 barrels per day (7,300 m^{3}/d).

In December 2009, the Iraqi government awarded a license to a joint venture from Royal Dutch Shell and Petronas to take over operations at Majnoon Oilfield, and triple production from the estimated reserve of 13 billion barrels (2.1×10^{9} m^{3}) at a fee rate of $1.39/barrel. The joint venture company is 25% held by the Iraqi Ministry of Oil, 45% by Shell and 30% by Petronas. Shell exited the project in 2013.

In February 1984, Iraqi mustard gas attacks on Majnoon Island killed approximately 2,500 Iranians after the Iranians captured the island.

== Bibliography ==
- The Longest War, by Dilip Hiro, Routledge Chapman & Hall, Inc., 1991. (pg. 103)
