= Midland Oil Company =

Iraqi state-owned oil company

Midland Oil Company is a state-owned oil company and is Iraq's fourth oil company. It is responsible for overseeing development in recently auctioned fields in the centre of the country. It is a state-owned company managed by the Iraqi Ministry of Oil.

== Partnerships ==
=== China ===
In October 2024, the Chinese company CNOOC Limited announced that it signed an Exploration, Development & Production Contract (EDPC) with the company. CNOOC has won a bid to explore an oil block, Block-7, located in Diwaniyah province, Iraq. This marks a significant shift in Iraq's oil industry as it moves away from technical service contracts and adopts a profit-sharing model with international partners.

=== Pakistan ===
In October 2024, Pakistan Petroleum Limited (PPL) has reached a settlement with Iraq's Midland Oil Company regarding their expired exploration and production contract for Block-8 in Iraq. This marks the end of their partnership in this particular project.

== See also ==
- Iraq oil law (2007)
- North Oil Company
- South Oil Company
