= Seokhyo Jang =

South Korean businessman

- Born: 27 October 1957; Seoul, South Korea
- Education: Inha University (BA); University of Minnesota (MBA)
- Occupations: Former President & CEO, KOGAS; Chairman, Korea Gas Union

Korean name
- Hangul: 장석효
- RR: Jang Seokhyo
- MR: Chang Sŏkhyo

Seokhyo Jang (born 27 October 1957) is a South Korean businessman who is president and chief executive of the Korea Gas Corporation (KOGAS) from 2013 to 2015.

== Background ==
Jang graduated from Jungdong High School in Seoul in 1975. He received a BA in business and economics from Inha University in 1982 and joined KOGAS the next year. In 1989, he received an MBA from the University of Minnesota Duluth, with a dissertation on economic policies in South Korea during the post-Park Chung Hee era.

== Work at KOGAS ==
Jang was president and CEO of KOGAS from 2013 to 2015. KOGAS is the largest LNG buyer in the world and operates four LNG terminals in South Korea. He was the first president to have been appointed from within the company. Prior to becoming CEO, Jang worked with global partners in LNG purchasing and has experience in marketing and resource divisions. He is credited with developing a close working relationship with other buyers in Asia to ensure security in energy demand and supply.

In addition to business endeavors, Jang has been behind KOGAS's increased involvement in CSR programs. In 2014, KOGAS ran a training program in South Korea for teams in Iraq and supported training programs and gas pipeline construction in Mozambique.

== Work at KGU ==
Since 2013, Jang was also the chairman of the Korea Gas Union, representing more than 70 local companies and organizations in the industry.
