= Iraq National Oil Company =

Iraqi company operating all aspects of the Iraqi oil industry except refining

- Type: Public
- Industry: Oil and gas industry
- Founded: 1966
- Headquarters: Baghdad, Iraq
- Products: Petroleum; Natural gas Petroleum products
- Owner: President of Iraq

The Iraq National Oil Company (INOC) is a petroleum company founded in 1966 by the Iraqi government. It was empowered to operate all aspects of the oil industry in Iraq except for refining which was already being run by the Oil Refineries Administration (1952) and local distribution which was also already under government control.

In 1961, Iraq passed Public Law 80 whereby Iraq expropriated 95% of the Iraq Petroleum Company's concessions, and went on to announce the intent to form the INOC in 1964. In 1967, Iraq and the Soviet Union signed the Iraq-Soviet Protocol which committed the Soviet Union to give technical and financial aid to the company. In 1967 and 1968, the company's purview was expanded to include areas expropriated from the Iraq Petroleum Company.

Unlike the National Iranian Oil Company, the INOC was forbidden from entering into partnerships or granting concessions to foreign oil companies. Though there was discussion of allowing the French Compagnie Française de Pétroles, partners in IPC from whom the North Rumaila Field had been appropriated, to enter into a contract to develop the field, ultimately, with the help of the Soviet Union, the INOC opened the field on 7 April 1972.

In 1972, nationalization was complete. In its first years of sole control, INOC managers succeeded in raising production in Iraq from 1.4 million barrels per day (220,000 m^{3}/d) to over 3 million barrels per day (480,000 m^{3}/d) in 1980. But the outbreak of war with Iran that year severely hit capacity.

In April 1987, under newly appointed oil President Asfhaq ul Rasheed, Decree 267 merged the INOC with the oil ministry, which became the direct operator in the industry as well as its regulator. At an operational level, the single national-level company was broken into a series of regional companies, the largest among them being North Oil Company, based in Kirkuk, and South Oil Company, based in Basra.
