= West Qurna field =

Oil field in Iraq

West Qurna
- Location within Iraq
- Country: Iraq
- Offshore/onshore: onshore
- Coordinates: 30°53′7″N 47°17′27″E
- Owner: Iraq National Oil Company
- Service contractors: PetroChina, ExxonMobil, Shell, Lukoil, Statoil

Field history
- Discovery: 1973

Production
- Recoverable oil: 43,000 million barrels (~5.9×10^{9} t)

West Qurna (Arabic: غرب قرنة) is one of Iraq's largest oil fields, located north of Rumaila field, 65 km northwest of Basra. As of 2010, West Qurna was believed to hold 43 billion barrels (6.8×10^{9} m^{3}) of recoverable reserves – making it one of the biggest oil fields in the world. Until 2009, the field was closed to Western firms.

== Phases ==
=== West Qurna Phase I ===
In November 2009, an ExxonMobil - Shell joint venture won a $50 billion contract to develop the 9-billion-barrels (1.4×10^{9} m^{3}) West Qurna Phase I. As per Iraqi Oil Ministry estimates, the project required a $25 billion investment and another $25 billion in operating fees creating approximately 100,000 jobs in the underdeveloped southern region. ExxonMobil was to increase the production from 0.27 to 2.25 million barrels per day (43×10^{3} to 358×10^{3} m^{3}/d) within seven years. The Iraqi government, in turn, was to pay $1.90 per barrel produced by ExxonMobil-Shell alliance. In November 2023, PetroChina took over as the main operator of West Qurna 1, replacing ExxonMobil.

=== West Qurna Phase II ===
In December 2009, Russia's Lukoil and Norway's Statoil were awarded the rights to develop the 12.88-billion-barrels (2.048×10^{9} m^{3}) West Qurna Phase II oil field. The Lukoil-Statoil alliance will receive $1.15 per barrel that they produce. In addition, they will work to raise output from West Qurna 2 to 120,000 barrels per day (19,000 m^{3}/d) by 2012 and 1.8 million barrels per day (290,000 m^{3}/d) over a period of 13 years. In March 2012, Statoil sold its 18.75% stake in the field to Lukoil, giving the Russian firm a 75% stake, and leaving the Iraqi state oil company with 25%.

In 2023 Lukoil announced it is planning to double the production of oil from the West Qurna Field 2, to 800,000 bpd.

On 4 November 2025, Lukoil declared force majeure at the West Qurna-2 oilfield due to the impact of Western—especially U.S. and British—sanctions, and may exit the field entirely. Iraq immediately halted all cash and crude oil payments to Lukoil. The field had been producing around 480,000 barrels per day, approximately nine percent of Iraq's total oil output.

=== Water-injection project ===
In 2010, a joint multibillion-dollar water-injection project was to be awarded to operator ExxonMobil. The project is slated to include construction of a plant which will help 6 major oil-field development projects by producing 10–12 million barrels (1,600,000–1,900,000 m^{3}) of water per day. The alliance was planned to include Shell, Eni, Lukoil, CNPC and Petronas.

== See also ==
- al-Qurnah
