= East Baghdad Field =

Oilfield in Iraq

- Location within Iraq
- Country: Iraq
- Offshore/onshore: onshore
- Coordinates: 33°21′8″N 44°38′53″E
- Operators: Iraq Ministry of Oil

Field history
- Discovery: 1976

Production
- Current production of oil: 3,000 barrels per day (~1.5×10^{5} t/a)
- Estimated oil in place: 8,000 million barrels (~1.1×10^{9} t)

East Baghdad Field is a group of oil fields, located east of Baghdad, Iraq. East Baghdad is proven to hold 8 billion barrels (1.3 billion cubic metres) of recoverable reserve and believed to have a production potential of 400,000 barrels per day (64,000 m^{3}/d). The oil field was discovered in 1976 and is 11 kilometres (6.8 mi) wide and 64 kilometres (40 mi) long.

In December 2009, despite previous negotiations with Japan's Petroleum Exploration Company, JAPEX, there were no bids to work on the oil field. Iraq's Ministry of Oil will likely work the site instead.

== See also ==
- Baghdad
