= ShaMaran Petroleum =

Oil exploration company

ShaMaran Petroleum Ltd.
- Type: Public
- Traded as: OMX: SNM; Nasdaq First North Stockholm EGO: SNM; Euronext Oslo
- Industry: Oil and gas
- Headquarters: Hamilton, Bermuda
- Key people: Garrett Soden (President and CEO); Elvis Pellumbi (CFO)
- Products: Petroleum
- Website: www.shamaranpetroleum.com

ShaMaran Petroleum Ltd. is an oil and gas exploration and production company. The Company is listed on the Euronext Growth Oslo in Norway and the Nasdaq First North Growth Market in Sweden under ticker symbol "SNM". ShaMaran is part of the Lundin Group of companies, a group of independent, publicly-traded natural resource companies that share the Lundin family as the major shareholder.

== Overview ==
ShaMaran is headquartered in Hamilton, Bermuda and is focused on the Kurdistan region of Iraq. ShaMaran has non-operated working interests in two adjacent oil blocks in Kurdistan.

The Company has a 50 percent working interest (66.67 percent paying interest) in the Atrush Block production sharing contract. The Atrush field was first discovered in 2011, and oil production started in 2017. Gross production in 2025 averaged 32,500 barrels of oil per day. The block is operated by HKN Energy Ltd., a private company based in Dallas, Texas, United States of America.

ShaMaran also has an 18 percent working interest (22.5 percent paying interest) in the Sarsang Block production sharing contract. The Sarsang fields were first discovered in 2011, and oil production started in 2014. Gross production in 2025 averaged 25,900 barrels of oil per day. The block is also operated by HKN Energy Ltd.

On October 20,2026 the Company announced strategic collaboration with HKN Energy in the Hamrin oil field in Federal Iraq. As part of this expansion, ShaMaran will have 25% shareholding in HKN Hamrin Ltd.

The same day ShaMaran announced that they had signed a merger and combination agreement with Gulf Keystone.

== See also ==
- List of petroleum companies
- Gulf Keystone
