= Iraqi Oil Tankers Company =

Government-owned company of Iraq

Coordinates: 30°28′59″N 47°48′32″E

- شركة ناقلات النفط العراقية

Agency overview
- Headquarters: Basra, Iraq
- Parent agency: Ministry of Oil
- Website: iotc.oil.gov.iq

Iraqi Oil Tanker Company (IOTC) (Arabic: شركة ناقلات النفط العراقية) is the state owned Iraqi company specializing in the ocean transport of crude oil and refined products. It was established in 1972.

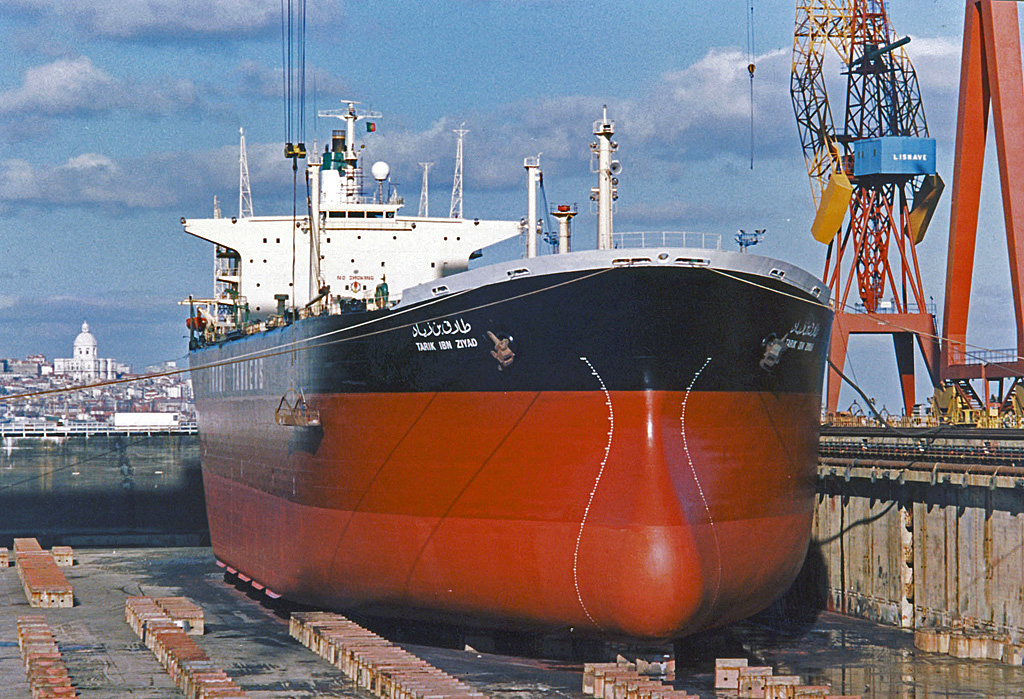
Tarik Ibn Ziyad Oil Tanker in Dry Dock in Lisbon, Portugal.الناقلة طارق بن زياد بالحوض الجاف في لشبونه البرتغال 1985

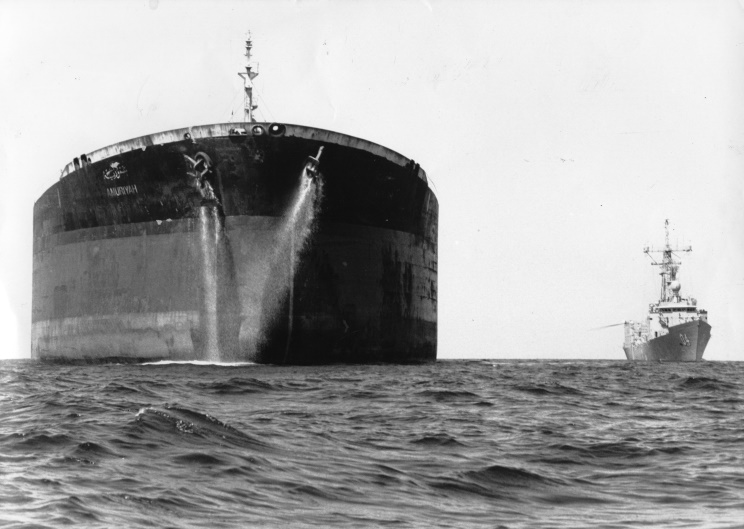
Oil Tanker Amoria in the Persian Gulf before the American Attack.

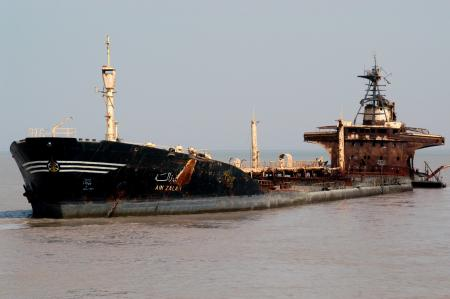
Ain Zalla Oil Tanker الناقلة عين زالة بعد الغرق

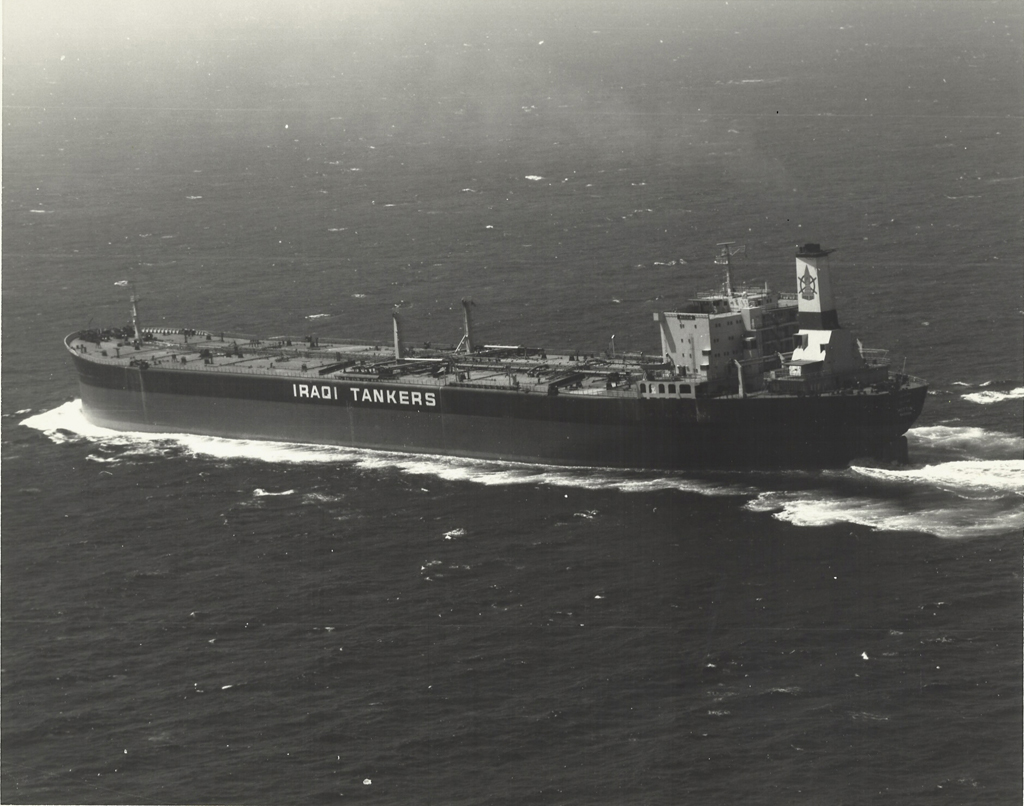
Iraqi Tanker Empty First Gulf War

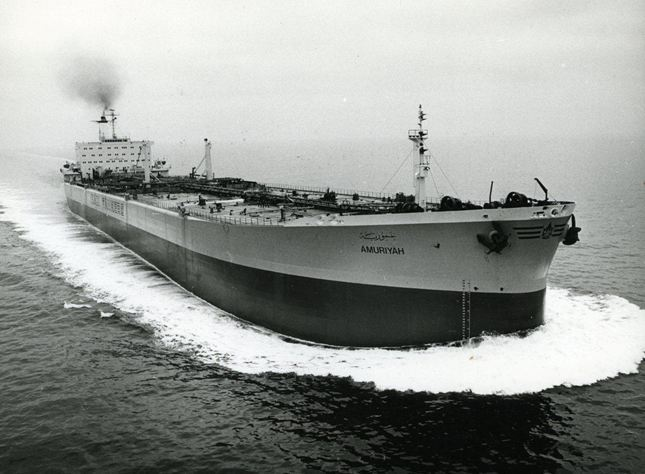
Oil Tanker Amoria one of Iraqi Oil Tanker Company (IOTC) fleet in 70s and 80s.

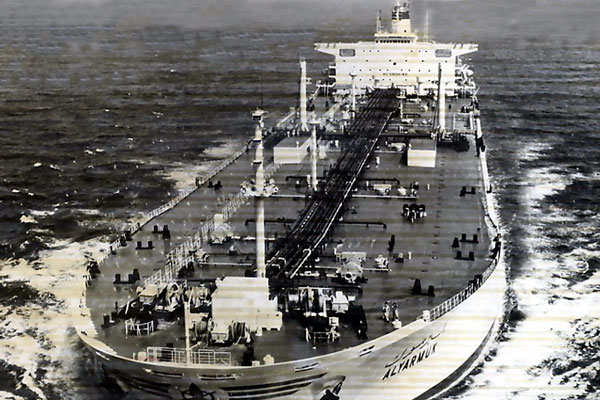
Al Yarmouk Oil Tanker, One of Iraqi Oil Tanker Company (IOTC) fleet in 70s and 80s.

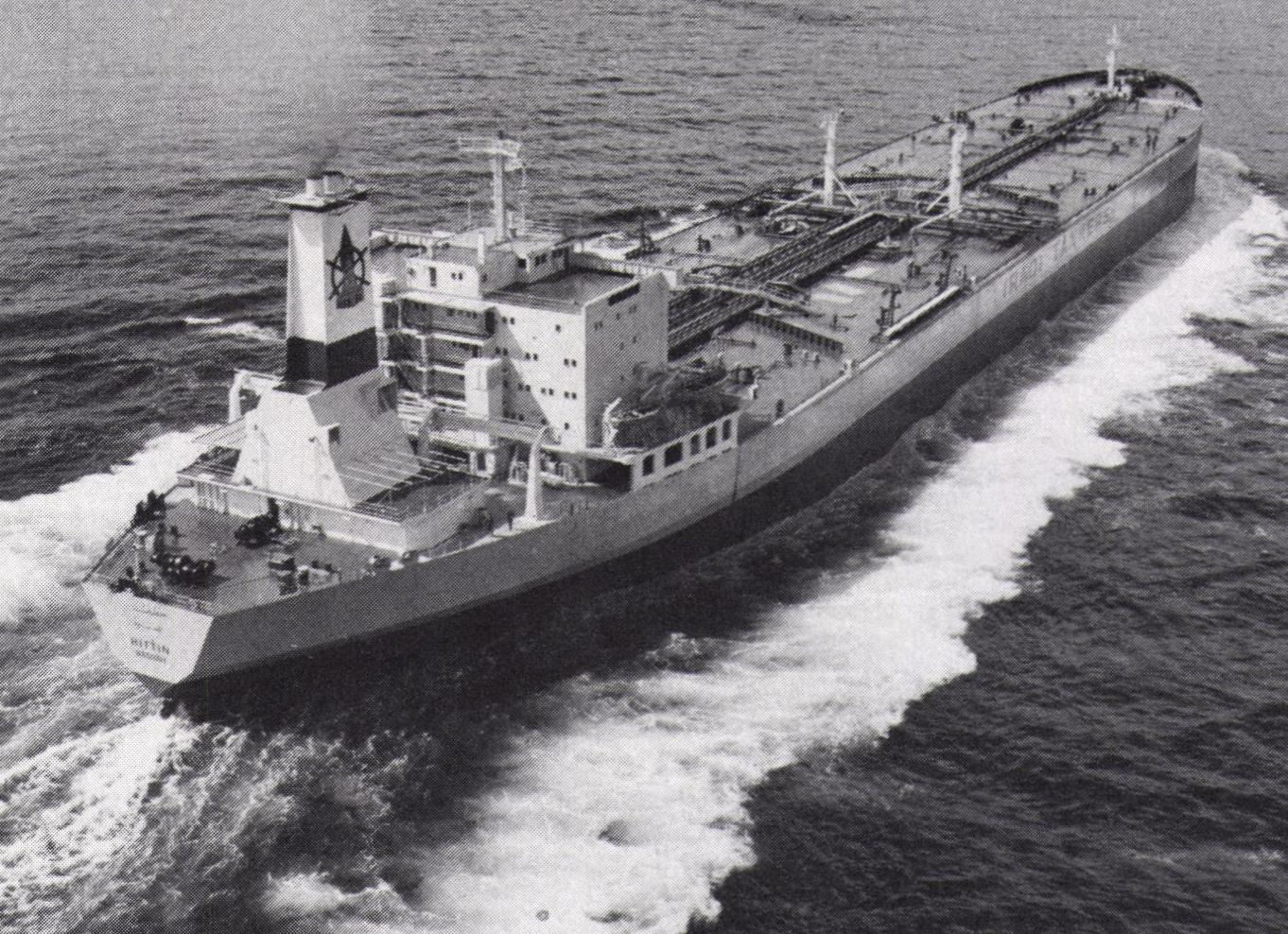
Oil Tanker Hiteen
