= Majnoon oil field =

Oil field in Iraq

Majnoon
- Location within Iraq
- Country: Iraq
- Location: near Basra
- Offshore/onshore: onshore
- Coordinates: 31.3°N 47.36°E
- Operator: Anton Oilfield Services; Petrofac
- Partners: Basra Oil Company (BOC) - 45% Petronas - (30%); Missan Oil Company - (25%)
- Service contractors: KBR

Field history
- Discovery: 1975

Production
- Current production of oil: 245,000 barrels per day (~1.22×10^{7} t/a)
- Estimated oil in place: 12,600 million barrels (~1.72×10^{9} t)
- Producing formations: Upper Cretaceous

The Majnoon Oil Field is a super-giant oil field located 60 km (37 mi) from Basra in southern Iraq. Majnoon is one of the richest oilfields in the world with an estimated 38 billion barrels of oil reserves. The field was named Majnoon which means crazy in Arabic in reference to excessive amount of oil in a dense area.

== History ==
The field was discovered by Braspetro, a Brazilian company in 1975, under the leadership of Bolivar Montenegro Guerra in a shallow Upper Cretaceous formation. Development came to a halt in 1980 during the engineering phase of the project, due to Iran–Iraq War, particularly Operation Kheibar. At the time, Braspetro had finished drilling of 20 wells and pressed 14 drilling rigs into service. In the course of the war, Iran occupied and sabotaged the area. After the war, Southern Oil Company of Iraq restarted the production. In the1990's, Total S.A. of France negotiated a development contract with Saddam Hussein but was unable to sign the deal due to United Nations sanctions imposed on Iraq. The deal was eventually annulled by Hussein in 2002. Due to the 2003 Iraq War, production was reduced to 46,000 barrels per day (7,300 m^{3}/d). In 2007, Total and Chevron signed an agreement with Iraqi government to explore the Majnoon field.

On December 11, 2009, the Iraqi government awarded a license to a joint venture from Royal Dutch Shell and Petronas to take over operations at Majnoon Oilfield, and triple production from the estimated reserve of nearly 12.6 billion barrels (2.00×10^{9} m^{3}) at a fee rate of $1.39/barrel. The consortium was awarded the contract out of 44 international companies, participating in the auction, with China National Petroleum Corporation (CNPC), ExxonMobil, Sinochem Corporation, Total specifically bidding on Majnoon field. The finalist alliance of CNPC and Total offering $1.75/barrel lost the bid. The deal intended a 20-year service and development of the field. The contract was approved by Council of Ministers of Iraq on January 5, 2010.

Shell agreed at the end of 2017 to exit the venture and hand over its operation to Basra Oil Company (BOC) by the end of June 2018. Shell was the operator and holder of 45 percent stake at Majnoon, with Malaysia's Petronas owning 30 percent, and Iraq's Missan Oil Company holding the remaining 25 percent. In June 2018 officials from Shell and Basra Oil Company met to mark the handing over of the operations of the field.

In April 2018, Chinese company Anton Oilfield Services signed an Integrated Facilities Management Services Contract (IFMS) with Iraq's oil ministry, a two-year deal with a one-year extension option, to operate maintenance and production of the Majnoon field on behalf of Basra Oil Company.

In May 2018, US company KBR, Inc. announced that it has been awarded an engineering, procurement and construction management contract (EPCM) by Basra Oil Company (BOC) for the development of the project and construction side of the Majnoon Oil Field in Basra, Iraq.

In January 2021, Anton Oilfield Services and Basra Oil Company agreed to renew their IFMS for two more years (each year a one-year extension option).

== Licences ==
Until June 2018 (when Shell - the operator exited) Shell held a 45% stake in all licences, Petronas 30% and Iraqi Ministry of Oil 25%.

== Reservoir ==
Majnoon's first pay zone consists of Upper Cretaceous which proved 4,000 barrels (640 m^{3}) of oil per day. Mishrif carbonates, Nahr Umr sands (Middle Cretaceous) and Shuaiba carbonates and Zubair sands (Lower Cretaceous) form the pay zones.

== Production ==
According to the 2009/2010 deal, the consortium was to increase production to a peak of 1.8 million barrels (290,000 m^{3}) of oil per day within a seven-year period. Majnoon was the first Iraqi field out of 10 major ones offered to international companies for development. The contract with Shell and Petronas included drilling over 40 production wells, construction of three gas separation stations and two crude oil processing refineries with overall capacity of 100,000 barrels per day (16,000 m^{3}/d). The official start date was March 1, 2010. In Phase I of the project, the consortium intended to increase production from 45,000 to 175,000 barrels per day (27,800 m^{3}/d) within a two-year period (i.e. until 2012).

In 2010 it was claimed that the production at Majnoon would move Iraq from the 11th place to the 3rd among oil producing nations after only Saudi Arabia and Iran. The country sits on 150 billion barrels of oil and produced 2.5 million barrels per day (400,000 m^{3}/d) in 2010. In 2010, Iraq was expected to increase oil production to 7 million barrels per day (1,100,000 m^{3}/d) within six years, thus competing with Saudi Arabia. However, in 2023 Iraq only produced 4.3 million barrels per day, compared to Saudi Arabia's nearly 9 million barrels per day.

== See also ==
- Ghawar Field
- Rumaila oil field
- Majnoon Island
