= Kirkuk–Baniyas pipeline =

Oil pipeline out of service

Location
- Country: Iraq; Syria
- Direction: east-west
- Start: Kirkuk oil field
- To: Baniyas

General information
- Type: crude oil
- Contractors: Bechtel
- Construction started: November 1950
- Commissioned: November 1952

Technical information
- Length: 891 km (554 mi)
- Maximum discharge: 0.3 million barrels per day (~1.5×10^{7} t/a)
- Diameter: 30 in (762 mm)
- No. of pumping stations: 4

The Kirkuk–Baniyas pipeline is a currently defunct crude oil pipeline built by the Iraq Petroleum Company from the Kirkuk oil field in Iraq to the Syrian port of Baniyas. The pipeline went into operation in April 1952.

The new line looped the Tripoli branch of the 12-inch Kirkuk–Haifa oil pipeline and its 16-inch loop line. Four of the old pumping stations were extended and reused: K-1, K-3, T-2 and T-4.

It was the second "Big-Inch" oil pipeline in the Middle East after the 1,080-mile Trans-Arabian Pipeline in 1950.

== Construction ==
In September 1950, Consolidated Western Steel's first pipes for the 490-mile, 30/32-inch portion between Kirkuk and the Homs Gap left Los Angeles. In October, the first ships departed Baltimore carrying National Tube Company pipes for the 90-mile segment of 26-inch pipe between the Homs Gap and Banias. Different diameters were used to allow shipping of small pipe sections inside large pipe sections to reduce transportation costs.

The total steel required was 167,918 tons (22,273 of 26-inch and 145,645 of 30- and 32-inch pipes). All 26-inch and 96,122 tons of the larger diameters was brought in via Tripoli by lighters and then by rail to the depot at Homs. The remaining 49,523 arrived at Basra and from there were brought by railroad to Baiji (K-2). The denesting and jointing plant was moved from Homs to Baiji in November 1951.

Shipping requirements were 7 ships for the 26-inch pipes, 18 ships for the larger pipes to Tripoli and 9 to Basra. The 26-inch pipe was seamless 3/8 inch thick. The larger diameters were longitudinally welded 3/8-inch and 7/16-inch. Like with the Trans-Arabian, 3 pipe sections were welded together at the depot and 93ft long pipe hauled by truck to the final resting place along the line. Storage capacity of the entire line (total amount of oil in the pipe) was 2,354,000 bbls to be filled.

The 30-inch pipes were laid at the points of high pressure, downstream from pumping stations. The 32-inch pipes at the sections leading into pumping stations where the pressure would diminish. The haulage required for the pipes was 527,094 ton miles for 26-inch pipe and 18,349,120 ton miles for the large diameter pipes.

The construction was carried out by Bechtel, who had just finished the Trans-Arabian Pipeline. The entire roster of United States corporations involved in the project was a repeat of the Trans-Arabian.

External videos
- The Third River

External videos
- King Feisal Opens Giant New Pipe Line

First welding commenced on November 28, 1950. The main welding crew began work on the 26-inch portion at mile 503, going east. A splinter crew worked from that starting point towards Banias. The project was hurried and the splinter crew upgraded to a regular second crew and started work soon after on the Iraqi-Syrian border, going east. The last shipment from Consolidated Western Steel departed from the Port of Los Angeles February 1952 aboard the SS Day Beam.

The line became operational between March and April 1952, first between the K-3 station and Banias using existing 12-inch and 16-inch excess capacity. The K-3 to Haifa branch of these predecessor lines was shut down in 1948. The tie-in weld at K-3 was made February 21 and the pipe was filled with oil as far as the T-2 station on March 6. The 149 mile section between K-3 and Kirkuk was the last to finish. The final weld was made at a meeting point 50 miles from Kirkuk. The new pipeline paralleled the existing 12 and 16-inch line to Tripoli most of the way. The final 60 miles to Banias were laid on a new right-of-way. The final 88 miles from a point of highest elevation to Banias were of 26-inch pipe. Map:

Two opening ceremonies, one at Kirkuk on November 18, 1952, and one at Banias on November 24 inaugurated the line.

== K-3 Slugging Station ==
A 6,450 bbl/day topping plant by Foster Wheeler was finished in December 1951. Some of its output was slugged into the old 12-inch line to be used as fuel for downstream compressor stations, which had previously been run on crude oil. Fuel oil was previously produced at a rate of 10,000 bbl at Kirkuk and transported to K-2 via 12-inch pipe as a contingency after the shutdown of the Abadan Refinery (Abadan Crisis).

== Operations ==
In October 1952, production at the Kirkuk field reached 443,300 bbls/day. The maximum capacity of the 12-inch and 16-inch lines was 160,000 bbls/day.

During the Suez Crisis, the pipeline was shut down due to sabotage. Stations T-2, T-3 and T-4 on Syrian soil were bombed in early November 1956. When Israel withdrew its troops from Egypt, the Syrian government gave permission in March 1957 for repairs to commence. Damage to the pipes was minor. Production at one third capacity using only Iraqi pumping stations was quickly restored.

Between 1982 and 2000 the pipeline was shut down by Iraq, due to Syrian support to Iran during the Iran–Iraq War.

During the 2003 invasion of Iraq, the pipeline was damaged by U.S. air-strikes and remained out of operation since then.

In December 2007, Syria and Iraq agreed to rehabilitate the pipeline. The pipeline was to be reconstructed by Stroytransgaz, a subsidiary of Gazprom. Stroytransgaz failed to start the rehabilitation and the contract was nullified in April 2009. As the rehabilitation of the existing pipeline is more costly than building a new pipeline, in September 2010 Iraq and Syria agreed to build two new Kirkuk–Baniyas pipelines. One pipeline with capacity of 1.5 million barrels per day (240×10^{3} m^{3}/d) would carry heavier crude oil. Another pipeline with a capacity of 1.25 million barrels per day (199×10^{3} m^{3}/d) would carry lighter crude oil.

As of 2023, Iraq seeks to activate the Kirkuk–Baniyas oil pipeline, in addition to the Basra-Aqaba pipeline with Jordan, and to revive a pipeline with Saudi Arabia that existed in the 1970s.

In April 2025, an Iraqi delegation headed by the Director of the National Intelligence Service, Hamid al-Shattri, visited Syria and met with its President, Ahmed al-Sharaa. They discussed restarting the pipeline’s operation.

In June 2026, a joint statement released by Iraqi prime minister Ali al-Zaidi and United States Special Envoy for Iraq Tom Barrack stated their shared commitment to rehabilitate the Kirkuk-Baniyas Pipeline.

== See also ==
- Kirkuk–Ceyhan Oil Pipeline
- Petroleum industry in Iraq
