= Halfaya Field =

Oil field of Iraq

- Location within Iraq
- Country: Iraq
- Offshore/onshore: onshore
- Coordinates: 31°49′39″N 47°25′20″E
- Operator: Iraq Ministry of Oil

Production
- Current production of oil: 100,000 barrels per day (~5.0×10^{6} t/a)
- Estimated oil in place: 4,100 million barrels (~5.6×10^{8} t)

Halfaya Field is an Iraqi oil field, located east of Amarah. Halfaya is proven to hold 4.1 billion barrels (650,000,000 m^{3}) of recoverable reserve and has production potential of 200,000–535,000 barrels per day (31,800–85,100 m^{3}/d). The China National Petroleum Corporation-led group finished the first phase of development in June 2012, increasing production from 3,000 barrels per day (480 m^{3}/d) to 100,000 barrels per day (16,000 m^{3}/d) 15 months ahead of schedule.

CNPC has started preliminary work on the second phase of Halfaya, which will bring the capacity to 200,000 bpd.

In December 2009, the China National Petroleum Corporation was awarded a 50% stake in the development of the field and France's Total S.A. along with Malaysia's Petronas were awarded a 25% stake. The consortium plans production at 535,000 barrels per day (85,100 m^{3}/d).

== See also ==
- Amarah
