= Braspetro =

Brazilian state company

Braspetro was a Brazilian state company. It was founded in 1972 as a subsidiary of Petrobras to find and produce oil outside Brazil. (As Petrobras had a monopoly over Brazilian oil production at the time, it was forbidden by law to operate internationally.) Its biggest discovery was Majnoon Field in Iraq.

Braspetro was incorporated by Petrobras and replaced by its international board, although it still formally exists as PIB BV - Petrobras International Braspetro B.V., a Dutch holding company that controls Petrobras's participation in foreign countries and is 100% owned by Petrobras.
