= Iraq Oil Law =

2007 oil legislation in Iraq

The Iraq Oil Law, also referred to as the Iraq Hydrocarbon Law was a piece of legislation submitted to the Iraqi Council of Representatives in May 2007 that laid out a framework for the regulation and development of Iraq's oil fields. It is a part of that nation's energy law.

== Start of process ==
The legislation started when the U.S.-backed Iraqi cabinet approved a new oil law that was set to give foreign companies the long-term contracts and the safe legal framework they have been waiting for. The law rattled labour unions and international campaigners, who say oil production should remain in the hands of Iraqis.

On March 10, 2007, prominent Iraqi parliamentarians, politicians, ex-ministers and oil technocrats urged the Baghdad parliament to reject Iraq's controversial hydrocarbon law, fearing that the new legislation would further divide the country already witnessing civil strife.

On April 28, 2007, discussions turned contentious among the more than 60 Iraqi oil officials reviewing Iraq's draft hydrocarbons bill in the United Arab Emirates. But the dispute highlighted the need for further negotiations on the proposed law that was stalled in talks for nearly eight months, then pushed through Iraq's Cabinet without most key provisions.

By December 2, 2007, the Bush administration was concerned that recent security gains in Iraq may be undermined by continuing political gridlock, and started pushing the Iraqi government to complete long-delayed reform legislation within six months.

== Administrative law response ==
On June 30, 2008, a group of American advisers led by a small State Department team played an integral part in drawing up contracts between the Iraqi government and five major Western oil companies to exploit some of the largest fields in Iraq American officials say.

In June 2008, the Iraqi Oil Ministry announced plans to go ahead with small one- or two-year no-bid contracts to ExxonMobil, Shell, Total and BP — once partners in the Iraq Petroleum Company — along with Chevron and smaller firms to service Iraq's largest fields. Several United States senators had criticized the deal, arguing it was hindering efforts to pass the hydrocarbon law.

By July 1, 2008, Iraq's government invited foreign firms Monday to help boost the production of the country's major oil fields, beginning a global competition for access to the world's third-largest reserves.

By February 2009, Iraq had "sweetened" the terms it was the offering international oil companies vying to develop the country's reserves in the first concrete example of a global shift in power beginning to sweep through the oil industry.

Iraq, which pre-qualified about 45 companies to bid on oil projects, plans to award contracts for the six partly developed and four undeveloped fields offered in its second licensing round by mid-December.

== History ==
The Iraqi oil industry had been completely nationalized by 1972. The government in the 1990s, under the presidency of Saddam Hussein, gave production share agreements (PSAs) to Russian and Chinese companies which gave a profit percentage of less than 10 percent.

The Bush administration hired the consulting firm BearingPoint to help write the law in 2004. The bill was approved by the Iraqi cabinet in February 2007. The Bush administration considers the passage of the law a benchmark for the government of Prime Minister Nuri Kamal al-Maliki. One stumbling block was the unpopularity of the law, as it is perceived by the Iraqi people. An opinion poll conducted in 2007 by Oil Change International and other groups shows 63% of Iraqis surveyed would "prefer Iraq's oil to be developed and produced by Iraqi state-owned companies [than] by foreign companies". This explains why the law had stalled in the Iraqi parliament.

== Profit sharing ==
The new law authorizes production share agreements (PSAs) which guarantees a profit for foreign oil companies.

The central government distributes remaining oil revenues throughout the nation on a per capita basis. The draft law allows Iraq's provinces freedom from the central government in giving exploration and production contracts. Iraq's constitution allows governorates to form a semi-independent regions, fully controlling their own natural resources.

== Criticism of the new law ==
Some critics have claimed that the new Iraqi Oil law was not needed since Iraq has the cheapest oil to extract. Other analysts have claimed that the no-bid contracts given to U.S. oil companies constitute exploitation since many non-U.S companies would give the same service for shorter contracts and lower percentage of revenue.

== See also ==
- Energy law
- Iraq withdrawal benchmarks
- Iraq Petroleum Company
- National Energy Policy Development Group
- Ray Lee Hunt
