= Kirkuk–Ceyhan Oil Pipeline =

Oil pipeline from Iraq to Turkey

- The location of the Kirkuk–Ceyhan Oil Pipeline

Location
- Country: Iraq, Turkey
- Direction: East–West
- Start: Kirkuk, Iraq
- To: Ceyhan, Turkey

General information
- Type: Oil
- Operator: North Oil Company
- Commissioned: 1970

Technical information
- Length: 600 mi (970 km)
- Maximum discharge: 1.5 million barrels per day (240×10^{3} m^{3}/d)

The Kirkuk–Ceyhan Oil Pipeline, also known as the Iraq–Turkey Crude Oil Pipeline, is a 600-mile-long (970 km) pipeline that runs from Kirkuk in Iraq to Ceyhan in Turkey. It is Iraq's largest crude oil export line.

== Technical description ==
The pipeline consists of two pipes with diameters of 46 inches (1,170 mm) and 40 inches (1,020 mm) and designed capacity of 1,100 thousand and 500 thousand barrels per day (~5.5×10^{7} and ~2.5×10^{7} t/a) respectively, totalling 1.5 million barrels per day.

== History ==
The line's Iraqi part has been a principal sabotage target since 2003. In October 2009, a blast near Mosul halted oil supplies through the pipeline. In August 2013, a bomb attack damaged the pipeline, near the al-Shura area 60 km to the south of the city of Mosul. In September 2013, a bomb damaged the pipeline near the Ein al-Jahash area.

In 2013, the Kurdistan Regional Government of Iraq completed a pipeline from the Taq Taq oil field through Khurmala (the northwest sector dome of the greater Kirkuk field) and Duhok to Pesh Khabur (Fesh Khabur) on the Turkey-Iraq border, where it is connected to the Kirkuk-Ceyhan pipeline. This 36-inch (910 mm) diameter pipeline has capacity of 150,000 barrels per day (24,000 m^{3}/d). It allows the export of oil from the Taq Taq and Tawke oil fields.

In May 2014, the first oil transported via the new pipeline was loaded into a tanker at Ceyhan. In 2014, Iraq considered building a new Kirkuk–Ceyhan pipeline to bypass attack-prone areas and double the export capacity. The large value of oil has political implications in a complex region.

In March 2023, the International Chamber of Commerce arbitration service ruled that the pumping agreement between the Kurdistan Region and the Turkish government was illegal, causing the pumping of petroleum products to and from the Kurdistan Region to cease. In August 2024, the North Oil Company carried out repairs to the pipeline to allow it to resume operations. By June 2025, the pause had caused a loss of around $25 billion.

In September 2025, the pipeline resumed operations after an interim agreement was reached between Iraq's federal oil ministry, the natural resources ministry of the Kurdistan Region, and international oil companies operating in the region.

The 2026 Iran war launched by the United States and Israel resulted in the closure of the Strait of Hormuz, obstructing much of Iraq's normal export flow of 3.5 million barrels per day. In March 2026, Iraq announced it was exporting 250,000 bpd through the pipeline. The pipeline contract with Turkey was scheduled to expire in July 2026, but in August 2026, Iraq and Turkey signed a one-year agreement extending use of the pipeline, covering a capacity of 750,000 barrels per day while negotiations continued on a longer-term agreement. The Baiji-Fishkhabour pipeline is being repaired and reconnected.

== See also ==
- Kirkuk–Baniyas pipeline, currently defunct
- Samsun–Ceyhan pipeline, was proposed but not built
- Baku–Tbilisi–Ceyhan pipeline, active
