= State Oil Marketing Organisation =

Iraqi national oil marketing company

Coordinates: 33°20′24″N 44°27′11″E

State Oil Marketing Organisation (SOMO)
- شركة تسويق النفط

Agency overview
- Headquarters: Baghdad, Iraq
- Agency executive: Ali Nazar Alshatari, Director General
- Parent agency: Ministry of Oil
- Website: somooil.gov.iq

The State Oil Marketing Organisation (SOMO) (Arabic: شركة تسويق النفط) is an Iraqi state-owned company responsible for marketing Iraq's oil. It is headquartered in Baghdad.

== History ==
The company was founded in 1998 and operates in oil and gas sector.
