= Rumaila oil field =

Oil field in Basra, southern Iraq

Rumaila
- Location within Iraq
- Country: Iraq
- Location: Basra, Iraq
- Offshore/onshore: Onshore
- Coordinates: 30.156112°N 47.407722°E
- Operator: Rumaila Operating Organization
- Owner: Basra Oil Company
- Partners: Technical Service Partners: Basra Energy Company Ltd (BECL) comprising BP and CNPC; State Oil Marketing Organization (SOMO)

Field history
- Discovery: 1953
- Start of production: 1954
- Peak year: 1979

Production
- Current production of oil: 1,421,000 barrels per day (~7.081×10^{7} t/a)
- Year of current production of oil: 2022
- Estimated oil in place: 17,000 million barrels (~2.3×10^{9} t)
- Producing formations: Main Pay, Mishrif, Upper Shale, Bn Umer, 4th Pay

The Rumaila oil field is a super-giant oil field located in southern Iraq, approximately 50km to the south west of Basra City. Discovered in 1953 by the Basrah Petroleum Company (BPC), an associate company of the Iraq Petroleum Company (IPC), the field is estimated to contain 17 billion barrels, which accounts for 12% of Iraq's oil reserves, estimated at 143 billion barrels. Rumaila is said to be the largest oilfield ever discovered in Iraq and one of the four largest oilfields in the world.

Under Abdul-Karim Qasim, the oilfield was nationalised by the Iraqi government by Public Law No. 80 on 11 December 1961. Since then, this massive oil field has remained under Iraqi control. The assets and rights of IPC were nationalized by Saddam Hussein in 1972, and those of BPC in 1975. The dispute between Iraq and Kuwait over alleged slant-drilling in the field was one of the reasons for Iraq's invasion of Kuwait in 1990.

After decades of under investment, due to sanctions by the west, by the early 2000s, the field was suffering not only from the natural base decline of its reservoirs, but also from ageing infrastructure and equipment, compromising production capacity, environmental protection and safety.

The town of North Rumaila is called "the cemetery" by the locals. A local environmental scientist told the BBC in 2022 that cancer in the area was so rife it was "like the flu".

The Rumaila Operating Organisation (ROO) continues to reduce gas flaring from its operated facilities at Rumaila with a reduction of approximately 60% from 2016 to 2021.

== Ownership ==
The field is owned by Iraq (Basra Oil Company). Following bidding rounds in the first decade of the 2000s, a Technical Service Contract was signed between BOC and bp, PetroChina and the State Oil Marketing Organization (SOMO) in 2009. This detailed the establishment of ROO as the operator of the oilfield and led to the introduction of new technologies and infrastructure, training and equipment for staff, and an extensive drilling and expansion programme.

In June 2022, Basra Energy Company Ltd (BECL), a company wholly owned by PetroChina and bp which manages the companies' interests at the Rumaila oilfield, assumed the lead contractor role from bp, under the existing Technical Services Contract. BECL was established to enable continued and optimized investment in the field, including enhanced access to external financing. ROO remained as the operator. The Technical Services Contract was extended in 2014 and now runs until 2034.

== Production ==
Transformation of the field began in 2010 and since then production has risen by 35%. During 2025, the field's reported production averaged 1,371,000 barrels per day (218,000 m^{3}/d) making up around 30% of Iraq's oil production of 4.6 million barrels per day (730,000 m^{3}/d). As of 2019, about 550 production wells were operating at Rumaila.

Production Facilities

The field is operated by Rumaila Operating Organisation. Facilities include a headquarters, waste management centre, supply base and training academy. There are also seven operational cluster pump stations and with 14 degassing stations - seven in the North field and seven in the South field. These degassing stations provide 3-phase separation (oil, water, and natural gas). Crude oil is sent by pipeline to local refineries or ports in Basra for export. Natural gas is provided to the Basrah Gas Company, as well as being used in the recently built Rumaila Power Plant which provides electricity to various oilfield facilities as well as the national grid. Water is disposed into disposal wells. Degassing station names:

- North Rumaila: DS1, DS2, DS3, DS4, DS5, NIDS, SIDS
- South Rumaila: Markazia (Rumaila), Janubia, Shamiya, Qurainat, Mishrif Shamiya, Mishrif Qurainat, Ratqa

== Reserves ==
Rumaila reportedly holds an estimated 17 billion barrels of oil; which accounts for 12% of Iraq's oil reserves, estimated at 143.1 billion barrels. The oil sits approximately 2,400 m (7,900 ft) below the surface which is considered an easy target for production. At current production rate of 1,421,000 barrels per day (225,900 m^{3}/d), the reserves-to-production ratio is just under 35 years.

== Importance ==
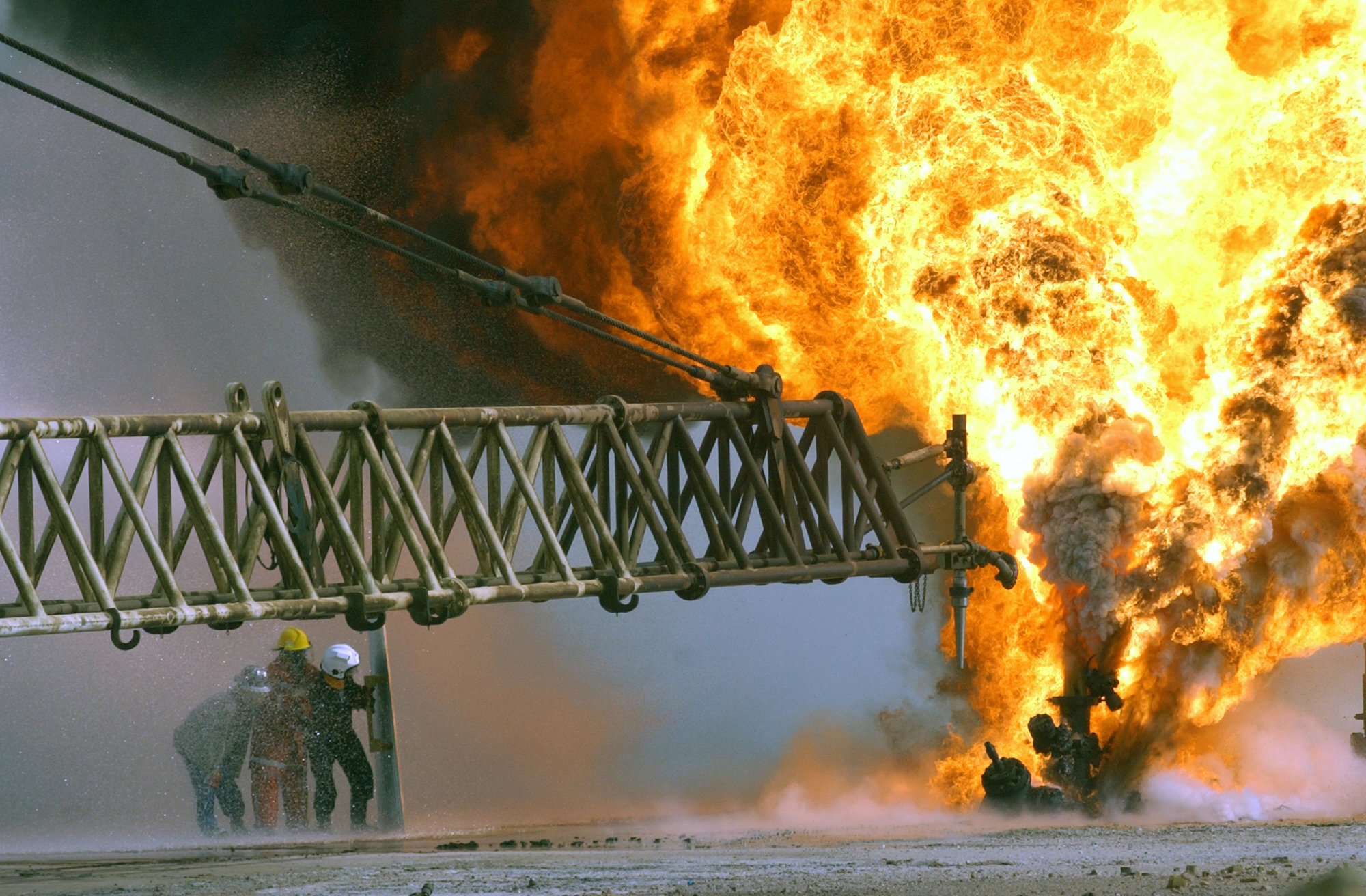
Firefighters from Kuwait attempting to extinguish a burning oil well at Rumaila in March 2003

Rumaila oil field was critical in the 1990 Gulf War. Iraq, after accusing Kuwait of allegedly side-drilling under Iraqi soil, launched an attack on Kuwait on 2 August 1990. In addition, Kuwait had been producing quantities of oil, which were above treaty limits established by OPEC. In fact, before the Iraqi occupation of Kuwait in 1990, Kuwait had drilled only 8 vertical wells in its part of the Rumaila field and the production was limited due to different technical problems. After the liberation of Kuwait in 1991, the United Nation border demarcation committee went back to the historical data and shifted the Kuwaiti border toward the north which meant that Iraq was producing from Kuwaiti territory.

During the 2003 invasion of Iraq, the Iraqi Ground Forces laid an 18 km long defensive minefield across it, which contained an estimated 100,000 mines. Iraqi forces also set fire to parts of the oil field as a defensive maneuver, though these fires were later extinguished by Coalition forces.

== Cancer risk ==
Gas, when burned openly, can produce pollutants that are linked to cancer. Iraqi law prohibits gas-burning less than 10 km from people's homes, but the BBC found in 2022 that gas was being burned as close as 350 meters from people's homes. A leaked report from the Iraqi Ministry of Health blamed air pollution for a 20% rise in cancer in Basra between 2015 and 2018; however, the Ministry of Health also prohibited its employees from speaking about the health damage. Iraqi Environment Minister Jassem al-Falahi later admitted that "pollution from oil production is the main reason for increases in local cancer rates." None of the affected locals received compensation.

According to bp, The Rumaila Operating Organisation has reduced gas flaring at its operated facilities by approximately 80% since 2016.

=== Potential causes ===
The production of oil can lead to the creation of "associated gas". Associated gases are gases introduced during the oil production process such as methane and hydrocarbons. Excess petroleum gas and other substances, if not used, can be flared. Gas flaring results in a multitude of harmful byproducts including carbon dioxide (CO_{2}), methane (CH_{4}), and black carbon. The World Bank has estimated that Rumaila has one of the highest known flaring levels in the world. Studies have found links between unconventional oil, gas development(UO&G), and air pollution. This air pollution as well as potential water contamination can lead to disruptions in early child development, in some cases leading to leukemia and cancer.

One specific particle that is linked to health impacts is, Polycyclic Aromatic Hydrocarbons (PAHs) which can be harmful and toxic. In a recent study PAHs have been found in soil concentrations in and around the Rumaila oil field; these concentrations are due to: oil production, refinement, exploration, air pollution, and oil spills. These amounts of PAHs surpass the set international limits of soil concentration. PAHs particles can become a public health issue when there is a build up of large concentrations in soil and groundwater. PAHs can make their way into food systems which in turn impact human and animal health.

=== Reported incidents and impacts ===
Local Rumaila communities are often not accounted for and under-represented in the media, In part because the Rumaila Oil Field is government owned. With this several of its documents including incident and health reports are privately monitored. One Iraqi citizen has opened one of the first cases of individual legal action against flaring carried out by the Rumaila oil firm. He alleges that his son was affected by the toxic chemicals produced by oil flaring which led to cancer development. It is also a concern that this prolonged health impact later led to his death. There are also unverified claims that 4-5 other deaths in the area were related to the pollution resulting from the oil field. An Iraq Health Ministry report also leaked information that cancer cases in the area had been three times higher than reported in the past.

== See also ==
- Ghawar Field
- Majnoon oil field
- West Qurna Field
