= JAPEX =

Japanese hydrocarbon and oil company

Japan Petroleum Exploration Company Limited

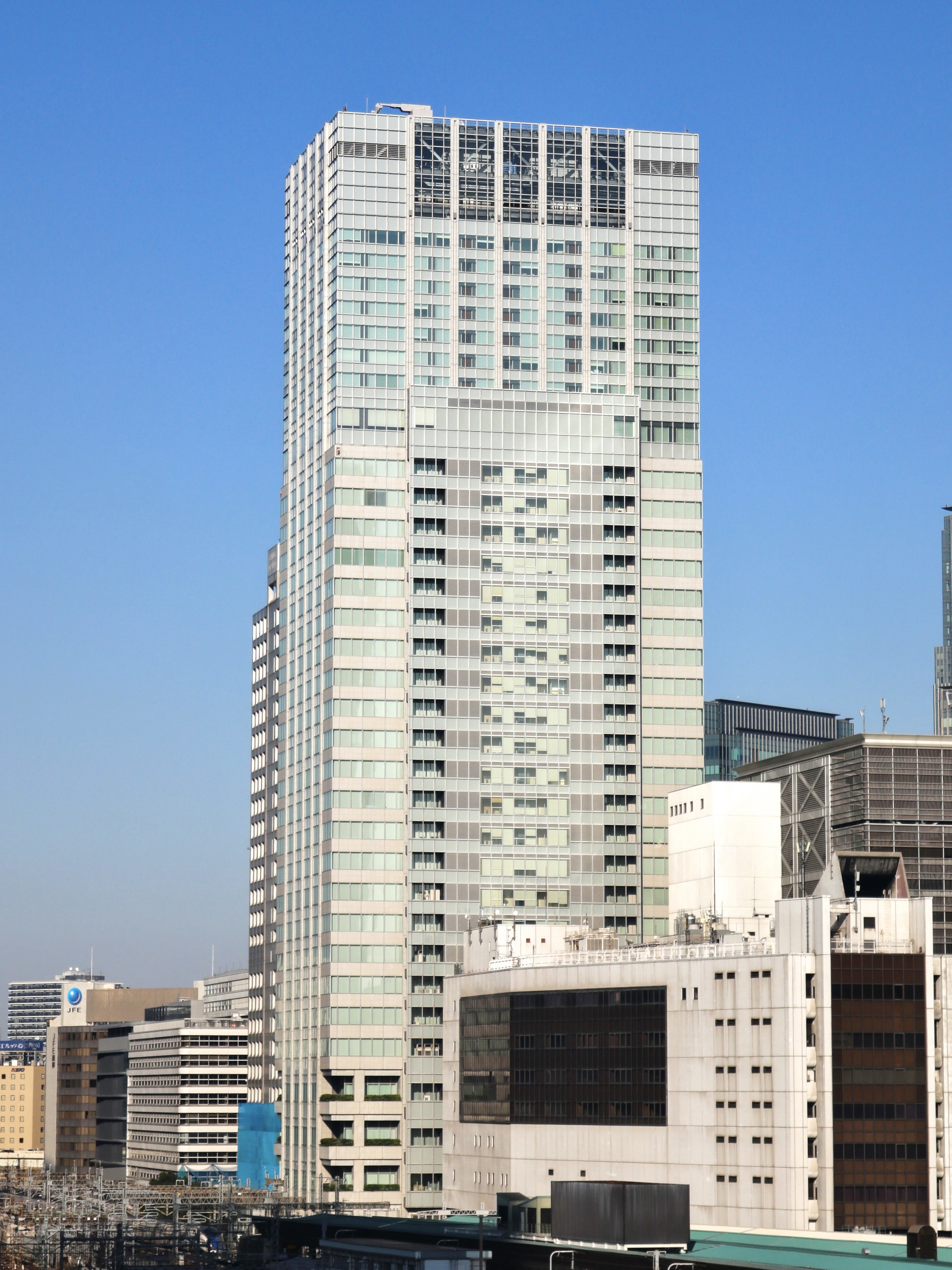
- Head Office (Chiyoda-ku, Tokyo)
- Type: Public company KK
- Traded as: TYO: 1662
- Industry: Hydrocarbon exploration, production
- Founded: 1955; 71 years ago (brand); April 1, 1970; 56 years ago (company)
- Headquarters: Marunouchi, Chiyoda, Tokyo, Japan
- Area served: Worldwide
- Key people: Osamu Watanabe, Representative Director and Chairman / Masahiro Fujita, Representative Director and President, Chief Executive Officer
- Revenue: ▲¥276,588 million JPY (FY 2014)
- Operating income: ▲¥24,634 million JPY (FY 2014)
- Net income: ▲¥29,015 million JPY (FY 2014)
- Owner: Ministry of Economy, Trade and Industry (34%)
- Number of employees: 1,782
- Subsidiaries: JAPEX Offshore
- Website: https://www.japex.co.jp

Japan Petroleum Exploration Company Limited (JAPEX) (石油資源開発株式会社, Sekiyu Shigen Kaihatsu Kabushiki-Kaisha) is a hydrocarbon exploration, production, and transportation company. JAPEX explores and produces crude oil, natural gas, and liquefied natural gas reserves worldwide. JAPEX has proven reserves of 272 million barrels in Japan and the rest of the world. Aside from operations in Hokkaido, Akita, Yamagata and Niigata in Japan, JAPEX has major operations in Canada, Indonesia and Libya. Currently publicly traded under the ticker TSE: 1662. The Government of Japan owns a 34% stake in JAPEX.

== History ==
JAPEX was founded in 1955 as a government-owned company in order to seek petroleum self-sufficiency for Japan. Between 1958 and 1968, JAPEX discovered 10 oil fields within Japan. In 1965, JAPEX's operational range began to go overseas and in 1967, JAPEX was incorporated into the government-owned Japan Petroleum Development Corporation (JPDC) and in 1968 JAPEX signed an agreement with the Government of Sabah North Borneo to the exploration of oil and gas for the first 10 years of the agreement. On 1 April, In 1970, JAPEX was separated from the JPDC and reorganized as a privately owned company.

In 1971, Japex Offshore Ltd. was created, spurring international and offshore exploration and production. In 1978, Japan Canada Oil Sands Limited (JACOS) was established. From 1980 to 2006, JAPEX would establish Japex U.S. Corps, Japex New Nanhai Ltd., Japex Pipeline Ltd., Shirone Gas Corp. Ltd., Japex Libya Ltd., Japex Block A Ltd., Japex Philippines Ltd. and Japex Buton Ltd. Between 1985 and 2005, JAPEX opened offices in Beijing, London, Jakarta, Houston and Dubai as well.

== Operations ==
JAPEX's exploration and production operations in Japan primarily center on Niigata, Akita, and Hokkaido. Overseas, JAPEX is focused on Southeast Asia, Canada, North Africa, the Middle East, and Sakhalin in Russia. In 2007, JAPEX produced 132 thousand barrels of oil equivalent a day; 100 thousand overseas and 32 thousand domestically.

Domestically, JAPEX conducts exploration and production near existing reserves while also exploring other areas of Japan. JAPEX is also working on systems to supply more natural gas and liquefied natural gas to a broader base of customers in Japan. JAPEX is currently extending and upgrading an already 826 km natural gas pipeline.

Overseas, JAPEX works to acquire the rights to already discovered oilfields and to acquire exploration rights in order to find additional oil reserves. JAPEX is involved in projects within the United States, Russia (Sakhalin Islands), Indonesia, Canada, Iran, Libya and had negotiated for Iraq's oil reserves as well.

On 1 October 2026, JAPEX completed its acquisition of four companies collectively known as Fundare, which held tight oil and gas assets in Colorado and Wyoming, United States. The transaction had an enterprise value of approximately US$278 million.
