= Korea Gas Corporation =

South Korean company

- Native name: 한국가스공사
- Type: Public; State-owned Enterprise
- Traded as: KRX: 036460
- Industry: Natural gas
- Founded: 1983; 43 years ago
- Headquarters: Daegu, South Korea
- Key people: Hong Ui-rak (CEO)
- Products: Liquefied natural gas
- Revenue: ₩37 trillion (2024)
- Parent: Ministry of Trade
- Website: www.kogas.or.kr (English)

The Korea Gas Corporation (KOGAS) is a South Korean state-owned natural gas company established by the Korean government in 1983 under the Korea Gas Corporation Act. It is one of the world's largest corporate buyers of liquefied natural gas, and operates five LNG regasification terminals and 5,346 km of pipelines in South Korea, supplying 216 cities and counties.

The company has a stake in the Prelude floating liquefied natural gas facility in Australia, along with investors Shell, Inpex Corporation, and CPC Corporation. It is the largest floating production structure in the world. Production started in December 2018.

== History ==
KOGAS was established in August 1983 under the Korea Gas Corporation Act (Law 3639, enacted December 1982), to supply natural gas for public convenience and welfare.

The company introduced liquefied natural gas to South Korea in 1986, beginning supply to the Pyeongtaek Thermal Power Plant that November. Supply was extended to the Seoul metropolitan area in 1987, central Korea in 1993, the southern mainland in 1995, the west coast in 1999 and Gangwon-do in 2002. KOGAS began supplying previously unconnected mainland areas in 2009 and Jeju Island in 2019, by which point the national pipeline network formed a single loop.

KOGAS was listed on the Korea Exchange in December 1999 and designated a market-type public corporation in 2007.

== See also ==
- Daegu KOGAS Pegasus
- KOGAS-Tech
