= Basra Oil Company =

National Iraqi company

Coordinates: 30°29′47″N 47°47′49″E

Basra Oil Company (BOC)
- شركة نفط البصرة

Agency overview
- Headquarters: Basra, Iraq
- Agency executive: Deyha Al-Mosawi, Director General
- Parent agency: Ministry of Oil
- Website: boc.oil.gov.iq

Basra Oil Company (BOC) (Arabic: شركة نفط البصرة), formerly Iraqi South Oil Company, is a national Iraqi company responsible for the oil in the south of Iraq. It is situated in Basra. BOC is one of the major fundamental formations of the Iraq National Oil Company (INOC). It was the first nucleus and the basis of national direct investment projects in the 1970s, where the BOC was subsidiary to the national company.

== Development ==
Events and activities have escalated steadily and rapidly, rising since the beginning of the 1970s. Investment and development stages of the north Rumaila field were completed in three stages, leading to a rate of production of 42 million tons per year and this coincided with the expansion of works in all fields.

The expansion began with drilling works, building and expanding production facilities, and implementing investment projects associated with natural gas fields in north and south Rumaila. Also developing new fields in Luhais, Saba, Nuhran Ben Ummer and oil fields in Maysan. Laying out an exporting pipe line, expanding export facilities and infrastructure sites for the company.

== Provision for staff ==
The company has provided housing and health care for staff and achieved ambitious plans in the fields of rehabilitation and development. It has created institutes and centers for training, technical and administrative development.

== Nationalization ==
During the mid–1970s there was a decree to nationalize the Basra Oil Company (BOC) and the activities of the Erab company in Maysan. There was attachment to the oil operation and establishment of the national oil company.

The BOC was classified as the first company in Iraq and the eighth in production rating for global oil companies. The company activities covered a geographical area of 180,000 m^{2} stretching from the Persian Gulf to Hadeth. During the 1970s the maximum rate of production from the south field was 2.75 million barrels per day (437,000 m^{3}/d) and the planned limit was 4 million barrels per day (640,000 m^{3}/d).

== War damage ==
The BOC was exposed to substantial damage during the Gulf War of 1990–1991. This reduced the production level to 2 million barrels per day (320,000 m^{3}/d) before the events of the year 2003. After the events of the year 2003, the whole of the fields, establishments and facilities of the company were damaged by vandalism, theft, arson and destruction. The destruction ratio was 80–90% of the BOC's property. This caused production to drop to 150,000 barrels per day (24,000 m^{3}/d).

== Reconstruction ==
By extensive and intensive reconstruction the company managed to increase production to 500,000 barrels per day (79,000 m^{3}/d) during the month of June the same year. It exported the first shipment of oil from the company's port during the same month. Thanks to the efforts of the staff, the company was able to restore production to 2.15 million barrels per day (342,000 m^{3}/d) during the first quarter of the year 2004.

== Artificial island ==
In 2019, the company has entered into a deal with a giant Netherlands-based marine construction company, Royal Boskalis, In what may be the largest offshore infrastructure project ever, Boskalis has undertaken over a three-year period to build the company an artificial island that will bring in oil through two new pipelines and send it out to the world through four marine docks. The project will add 3 million barrels per day to Iraq's export capacity.

== See also ==
- Sharikat Naft Al-Basra, the company's football team from 1941 until 1968
- Iraq oil law (2007)
- North Oil Company
- Oil megaprojects
- Oil megaprojects (2010)
