= North Oil Company =

Government-owned company of Iraq

- شركة نفط الشمال

Agency overview
- Headquarters: Kirkuk, Iraq
- Parent agency: Ministry of Oil
- Website: nocoil.gov.iq

North Oil Company (NOC) (Arabic: شركة نفط الشمال) is an Iraqi state-owned company based in Kirkuk, Iraq.

The North Oil Company is one of the 16 companies owned by the Iraqi Ministry of Oil. Headquartered in Kirkuk, its boundaries extend from the northern borders to the 32.5 degree parallel, just south of Baghdad.

The company operate the Kirkuk–Ceyhan Oil Pipeline and in August 2024 carried out repairs to the pipeline to allow it to resume operations following agreement with the Kurds.

The company, along with the North Gas Company, is responsible for exploring, managing and producing oil in Kirkuk and Kurdistan Region.

== Operations ==
In October 2024, the company, together with the Iraqi KAR group granted concessions to Chinese companies for the Alaan and Sasan oil/gas fields.

In December 2024, the company rehabilitated a key gas plant that had been out of service for 10 years.

In February 2025, the company recommended production from 35 wells in the Kirkuk region.

In March 2025, the company finalised a contract with the North Gas Company (NGC) and BP to redevelop the Kirkuk oil field.

As of 2026, the company has extended its operations to Kurdistan Region, where it enjoys the exclusive authority to explore, manage and produce oil, after the International Chamber of Commerce issued a verdict in favour of Iraq's decision to establish all oil in the country under central control.
