= Ministry of Oil (Iraq) =

Government ministry of Iraq

Republic of Iraq Ministry of Oil وزارة النفط العراقية

Ministry overview
- Jurisdiction: Iraq
- Headquarters: Baghdad
- Minister responsible: Bassim Mohammed Khudair
- Website: www.oil.gov.iq

The Ministry of Oil (Arabic: وزارة النفط) is a central government ministry of Iraq whose task is managing and developing natural resources (oil and gas).

The current minister is Bassim Mohammed Khudair, who was appointed in May 2026 after previously serving as deputy oil minister.

== History ==
In March 2025, the Ministry of Oil entered into a contract with BP to develop four oil fields in Kirkuk: Avana, Baba, Bai Hassan, and Khabbaz. The deal, valued between $20–25 billion, aims to boost crude production by 150,000 barrels per day, reaching 450,000 bpd within three years. It also includes plans to expand natural gas production and reduce gas flaring by 2028.

== Establishments ==
A number of companies, institutes, and other organisations come under the direct jurisdiction of the Ministry of Oil, such as:

- North Oil Company (NOC)
- South Oil Company (SOC)
- Petroleum Research & Development Center (PRDC)
- Baiji Oil Training Institute (BAJOTI)
- Basrah Oil Training Institute (BASOTI)
- Kirkuk Oil Training Institute (KOTI)
- Baghdad Oil Training Institute (BOTI)
- Heavy Engineering Equipments Company (HEESCO)
- South Refineries Company (SRC)
- Midland Refineries Company (MRC)
- North Refineries Company (NRC)
- Gas Filling Company (GFC)
- Midland Oil Company (MDOC)
- South Gas Company (SGC)
- North Gas Company (NGC)
- Missan Oil Company (MOC)
- Iraqi Drilling Company (IDC)
- Oil Products Distribution Company (OPDC)
- State Organization for Marketing of Oil (SOMO)
- Oil Pipelines Company (OPC)
- Iraqi Oil Tankers Company (IOTC)
- Oil Exploration Company (OEC)
- State Company for Oil Projects (SCOP)
