= William Knox D'Arcy =

British and Australian businessman (1849–1917)

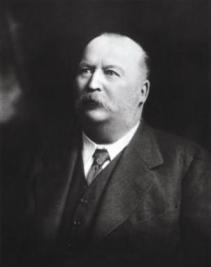
- Born: 11 October 1849; Newton Abbot, Devon, England
- Died: 1 May 1917 (aged 67); Stanmore, Middlesex, England
- Education: Westminster School
- Known for: D'Arcy Concession; founder of the Anglo-Persian Oil Company
- Spouse: Elena Birkbeck (m. 1872)

William Knox D'Arcy (11 October 1849 – 1 May 1917) was a British and Australian businessman who was one of the principal founders of the oil and petrochemical industry in Persia. D'Arcy founded the Anglo-Persian Oil Company in 1909, which later became BP. The D'Arcy Concession was signed in 1901 and allowed D'Arcy to explore, obtain, and market oil, natural gas, asphalt, and ozokerite in Persia.

== Early life ==
He was born in Newton Abbot, Devon, England and was the son of a solicitor, William Francis D'Arcy. He attended Westminster School until 1866, when the family emigrated to Australia following his father's bankruptcy, settling in Rockhampton, Queensland. D'Arcy continued his studies and chose to follow law, later joining his father's business. He did well and began to speculate, initially in land.

He married Elena Birkbeck of Rockhampton at St Patrick's Cathedral, Parramatta, on 23 October 1872. Elena was born in Mexico in 1840, the only daughter of Damiana de Barre Valdez and Samuel Birkbeck, a mining engineer from Illinois in the United States, who was in Mexico managing a silver mine. She was descended from the English Birkbecks, a Quaker family with an interest in education.

== Mining in Australia and New Zealand ==
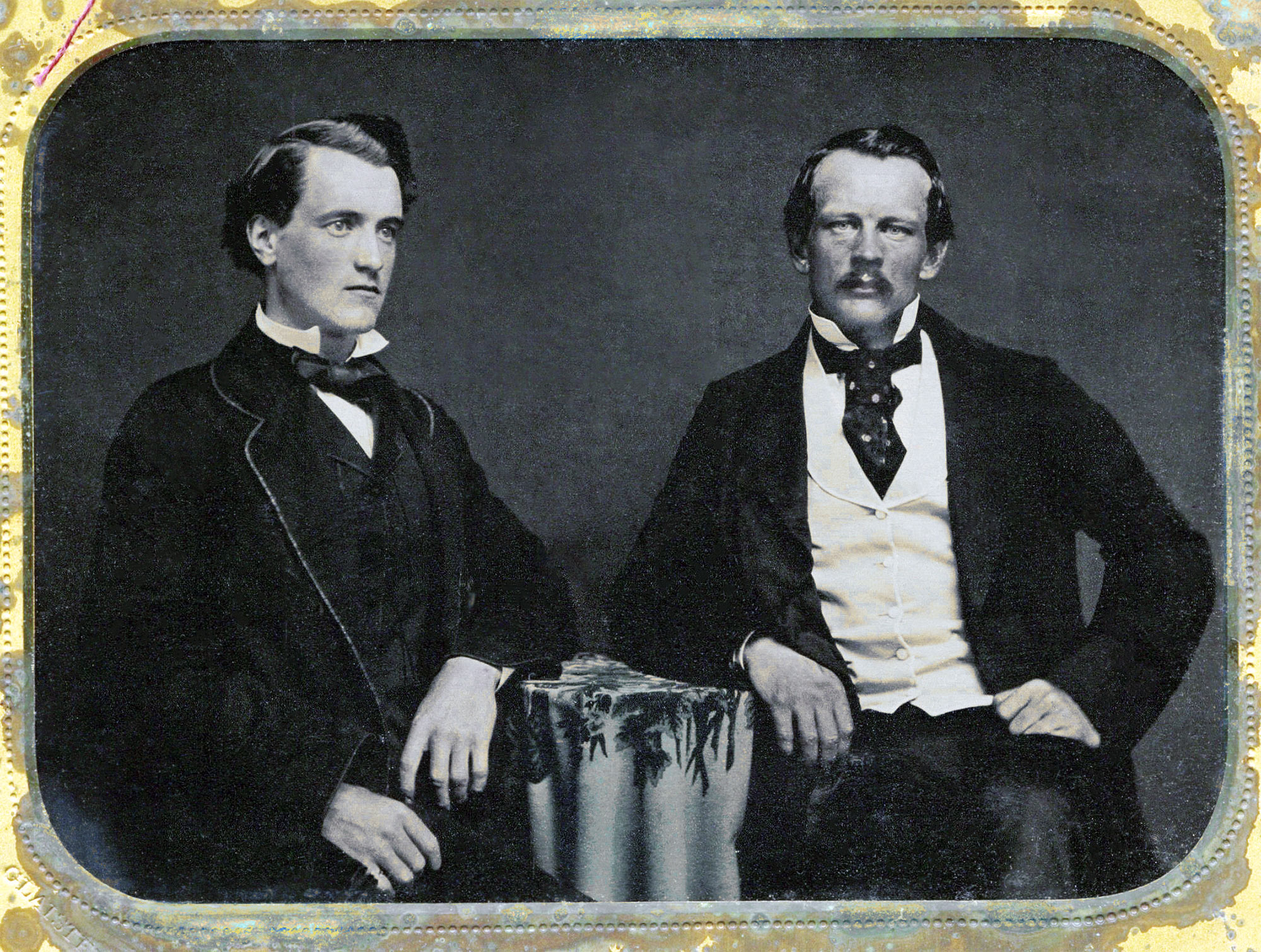
Walter Hall and D'Arcy c.1885

In 1882 he became a partner, with Walter Russell Hall and Thomas Skarratt Hall, in a syndicate with Thomas, Frederick and Edwin Morgan when they opened a mine on Ironstone Mountain (later renamed Mount Morgan), in Queensland, 24 miles (39 km) south of Rockhampton. There was a significant deposit at Mount Morgan Mine. In October 1886, the syndicate became the Mount Morgan Gold Mining Company, with D'Arcy a director and the largest shareholder. He held 125,000 shares in his own name and 233,000 in trust. At one stage the shares reached £17/1s/- each, making them worth more than £6 million (an amount equivalent to £674 million in present-day terms). The company also worked a rich gold mine at Matakanui, Central Otago, New Zealand, through its subsidiary the Mount Morgan Sluicing Company.

== Oil exploration in Persia ==
In 1889, with a substantial fortune, D'Arcy and his family moved to England, where he bought the Stanmore Hall mansion, a house on Grosvenor Square and rented Bylaugh Park. His wife, Elena, died in 1897 and, in 1899, he married Nina Boucicault (a first cousin of her namesake, celebrated Irish stage and film actress Nina Boucicault), with whom he lavishly entertained guests. He had acquired a strong interest in horse-racing while in Australia, and maintained a private box at Epsom racecourse.

In 1900, he agreed to fund a search for oil and minerals in Persia headed by Wolff, Ketabchee and Cotte, although D'Arcy never visited Persia himself. Negotiations with the Mozaffar al-Din Shah Qajar began in 1901, and with the offer of £20,000 (£2.1 million today), for a sixty-year concession to explore for oil – later, the D'Arcy Concession – was secured in May, covering 480,000 square miles (1,200,000 km^{2}), and stipulated that D'Arcy would have the oil rights to the entire country except for five provinces in Northern Iran. In exchange, the Iranian government was given 16% of the oil company's annual profits, an agreement that would remain in effect until the nationalisation of the industry by the Iranian government in March 1952.

A drilling team under George B. Reynolds was sent to Chiah Surkh and drilling commenced at the end of 1902. Despite drilling a producer in January 1904, D'Arcy had already spent £160,000, and was overdrawn at Lloyds Bank by £177,000. D'Arcy was forced to find further financial support, and in 1905 the Concession Syndicate was established with Burmah Oil Company Ltd. as a major investor, and D'Arcy's operation a subsidiary. More importantly, operations moved to the Shardin region in 1906.

Drilling in southern Persia at Shardin continued until 1907, when the search was switched to Masjed Soleyman (Masjed-e-Sulayman in Persian مسجد سلیمان), in a place named Maydon-e-Naftune. Drilling began at one site in January 1908, and at another nearby in March. By April, with no success, the venture close to collapse, and D'Arcy almost bankrupt, he decided, with Burmah, to abandon exploration in Iran. In early May 1908, they sent Reynolds a telegram stating that they had run out of money and ordering him to "cease work, dismiss the staff, dismantle anything worth the cost of transporting to the coast for re-shipment, and come home". Reynolds delayed following these orders and in a stroke of luck, struck oil at 1,180 feet (360 m) shortly after on 26 May 1908.

In April 1909, D'Arcy was appointed a director of the newly founded Anglo-Persian Oil Company (APOC), which would later become British Petroleum (BP). By 1911, APOC had run a pipeline from the find to a refinery at Abadan. In 1912, the Mount Morgan company was listed in London, and D'Arcy was made chairman of that board.

The financial support given by Burmah Oil and the British Admiralty meant that D'Arcy could no longer put his name to the new company despite the best efforts of his wife, and so was a shareholder.

== Later life ==
Later in life he lived at Stanmore Hall, Middlesex. It was enlarged by Brightwen Binyon in 1888–91. A billiard room and new dining room were created. Then he commissioned from William Morris and Edward Burne-Jones a suite of tapestries, 'The Quest of the Holy Grail', that were displayed in the hall but are now dispersed. He also owned paintings by Frank Dicksee and Frederick Goodall. He died on 1 May 1917, aged 67. D'Arcy was posthumously inducted into the Queensland Business Leaders Hall of Fame in 2012.
