= George Bernard Reynolds =

British geologist

George B. Reynolds
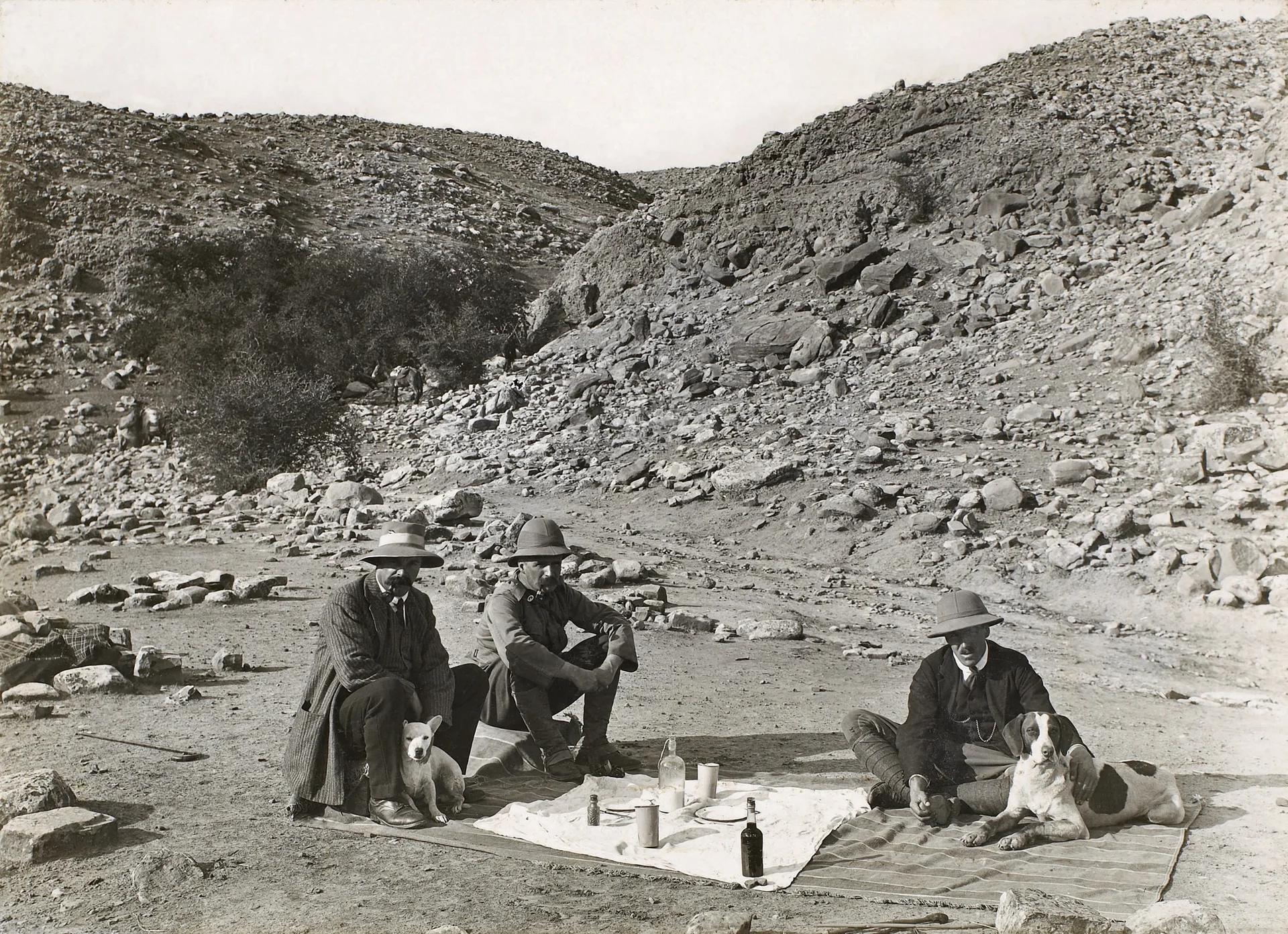
- Reynolds (left) with assistants in Iran
- Born: 5 April 1853; Sussex, England
- Died: 23 February 1925 (aged 71)
- Education: Royal Indian Engineering College
- Spouse: Lavinia Jane Baker (m. 1872)

George Bernard Reynolds (5 April 1853 – 23 February 1925) was a British geologist and oil industry executive who played a significant role in the development of Iran's oil industry in 1908 as well as that of Venezuela in 1922. He is often associated with William Knox D'Arcy, an English entrepreneur who obtained a concession from the Iranian government to explore and extract oil in Iran.

== Early life ==
Reynolds was born on 5 April 1853, in Sussex, England from a notable family background, with his father, George Stewart Reynolds, serving as a Vice-Admiral in the British Royal Navy, and his mother, Eliza Susanna. In 1873, he attended the Royal Indian Engineering College at Coopers Hill, Windsor, an institution known for training engineers for service in the Indian Civil Service. In 1895, he married Lavinia Jane Baker in England.

== Career ==
Reynolds began his career in British India's Public Works Department, particularly in the State Railways, which were primarily coal-driven at the time. He served diligently in this capacity from 1875 to 1897, eventually attaining the positions of Executive Engineer and Certified Mine Manager. Following his retirement from the Indian Civil Service, he worked in oil wells in the Dutch East Indies (now Indonesia). In 1901, Reynolds was hired by William Knox D'Arcy to lead oil exploration efforts in Persia.

== Oil exploration in Iran ==
In 1901, D'Arcy received a concession from the Qajar dynasty in Iran to explore for oil in the country. Reynolds worked closely with D'Arcy and played a key role in the early years of Anglo-Persian Oil Company. A drilling team under Reynolds was sent to Chiah Surkh and drilling commenced at the end of 1902. He conducted important geological surveys in Iran, which helped identify oil-rich areas and his work was instrumental in the discovery and development of oil resources in Iran, which had a significant impact on the global oil industry.

Drilling in southern Persia at Shardin continued until 1907, when the search was switched to Masjed Soleyman, in a place named Maydon-e-Naftune. Drilling began at one site in January 1908, and at another nearby in March. By April, with no success, the venture close to collapse, and D'Arcy who was almost bankrupted, decided with his partners Burmah Oil to abandon exploration in Iran. In early May 1908, they sent Reynolds a telegram stating that they had run out of money and ordering him to "cease work, dismiss the staff, dismantle anything worth the cost of transporting to the coast for re-shipment, and come home". Reynolds delayed following these orders and in a stroke of luck, struck oil at 1,180 feet (360 m) shortly after on 26 May 1908.

While D'Arcy is often credited with the initial concession, Reynolds and his contributions to the technical and geological aspects of the oil industry in Iran is not overlooked. They were both pivotal figures in the early history of Iran's oil industry, which eventually became a crucial part of the global oil production landscape.
