= Naft Khana =

Village in Iraq

Naft Khana is an Iraqi town in Diyala Governorate, central Iraq, near the Iraqi-Iranian border. Its population were Kurdish nationality during the Iran-Iraq war. Its residents were displaced according to the Arabization policy. Nearby are oil fields containing oil wells found by British companies after the British occupation in 1924. It is considered one of the richest areas in the Diyala Governorate.

== Iraq–Iran war ==
It turned into a purely military area, where Iraqi army established camps and headquarters for the border guards, and after the American-Iraqi war, and after the fall of Saddam Hussein's regime, specifically in the year 2003, Kurdish families began to return to this area, but they found it a barren desert inhabited only by wolves.

== Oil field ==
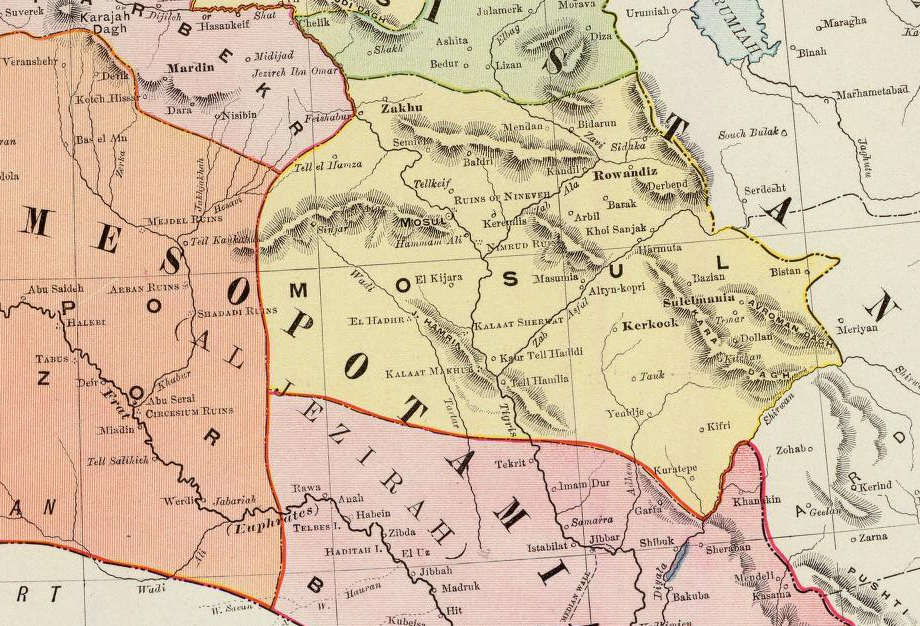
The border in 1897

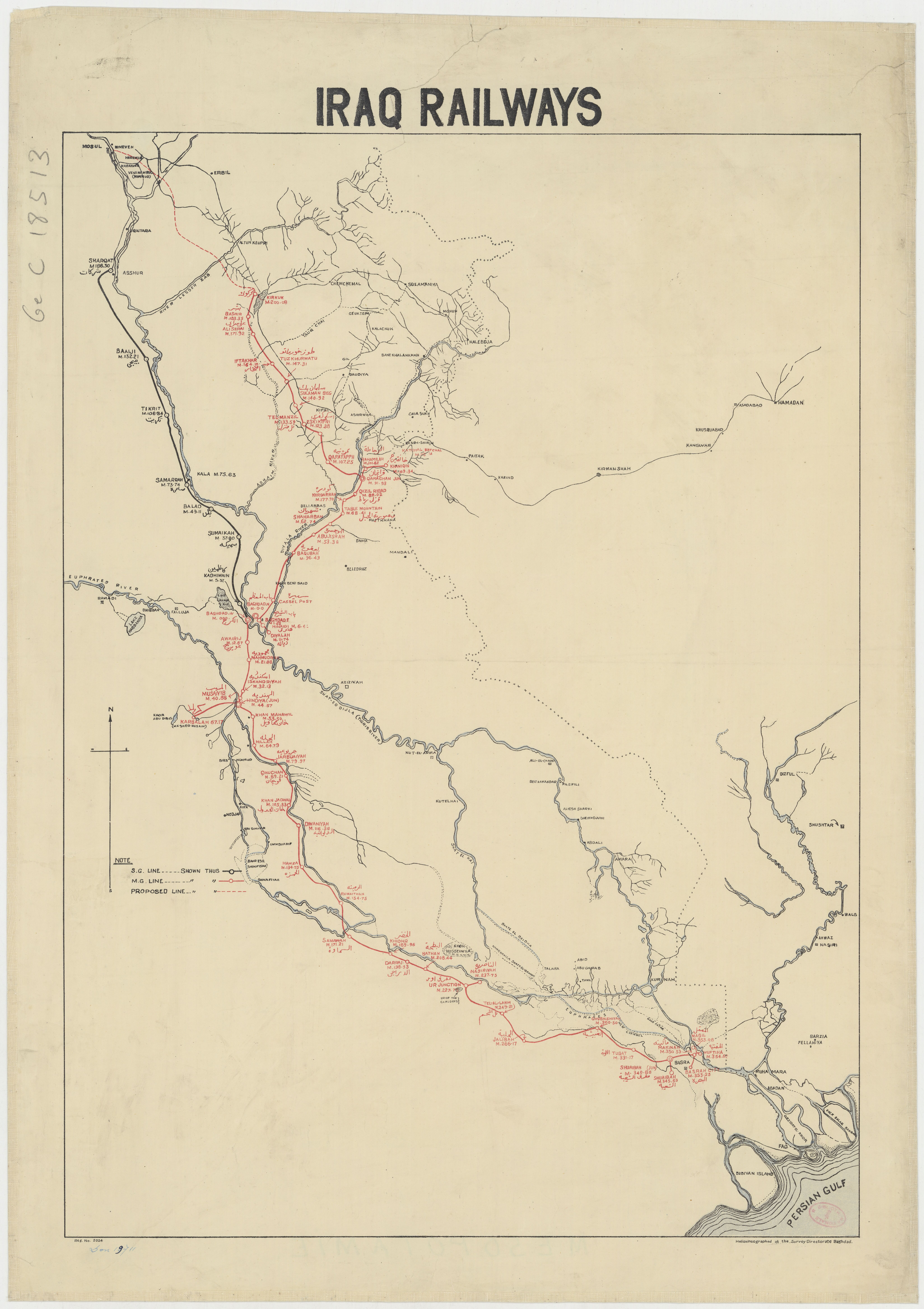
Eastern Line RR network

Approximate location shown on a 1948 World Oil map: 34°02′N 45°28′E

The territory belonging to present-day Iraq was part of Transferred Territory, land that was given by Persia to the Ottoman Empire (Treaty of Constantinople of November 17, 1913) and then became part of the Kingdom of Iraq. The Anglo-Persian Oil Company had acquired rights over the area with the 1901 D'Arcy Concession and those rights were safeguarded under the land transfer. Full text of Annex B of the November 17, 1913, protocol:

The field was "discovered" in 1918 by George Whitfield Halse (1885–1968), who on the request of the British Army prospected for sources of oil closer to the frontline (than Abadan). He left the area in 1918 or 1919, but based on his conclusions, in 1923 oil was struck and Naft Khaneh became "the second" oil field discovered in the Middle East.

APOC formally agreed on August 30, 1925, to form a subsidiary within 3 months to take over the assets in the Transferred Territory and to construct without undue delay a refinery. In the agreement of May 24, 1926, the company agreed to sell its products inside Iraq at a price not higher than the Turkish Petroleum Company (as specified in the March 14, 1925, TPC concession) and to pay a 4 shilling royalty per ton of oil exported from Iraq, subject to a future adjustment peg to world market prices. In return the 1901 d'Arcy concession inside the Transferred Territories was affirmed and extended by 35 years to May 27, 1996. The agreement was ratified as Law No. 58 for 1926 ("Law for the concession of the Anglo-Persian Oil Company, Limited").

The Iraqi part of the field was transferred to the Khanaqin Oil Company (subsidiary of APOC) in 1925, named after the nearby Iraqi town where a small topping plant was also set up. Construction of this refinery on the Alwand River began in June 1926. Regular production at Naft Khana began on March 12, 1927 and the refinery was officially commissioned on May 7, 1927. In the 1920s a 24-mile 4-inch line was laid to connect the field to the refinery. Distribution of the products of the refinery was the business of the Rafidain Oil Co., which had depots at the major population centers. Rafidain Oil was a subsidiary of the Iraq Petroleum Company and formed in May 1932 to take over this obligation from the Khanaqin Oil Company, in accordance with Article 14 ("Oil for local consumption") of the March 14, 1925, concession. The APOC only held a 23.75% share in the Iraq Petroleum Company, while its share in Khanaqin Oil was 100%. Khanaqin was connected via metre-gauge railroad to Baghdad in 1918.

The Kermanshah Petroleum Oil Company (also subsidiary of APOC) was formed in 1934 to develop the Iranian side (called Naft-i Shah). In 1935, a 158-mile 3-inch pipeline to Kermanshah was completed over difficult terrain. It had 4 pumping stations, three powered by 3 x 45bhp diesel engines (9 total) and one by steam (at the field) with high pressure horizontal reciprocating maximum 1,500 psi pumps in each. The pipe manufactured by Stewarts & Lloyds was electrically welded and tested to a pressure of 2,300 psi. A 3000 bbl/day topping plant was built in Kermanshah. The Kermanshah refinery (34°22′N 47°6′E) was also referred to as Chia Mirza and located 2.5 miles northeast of the town on the banks of the Qarasu River. It processed oil partially refined at the Naft-i-Shah ropping plant.

Production was concentrated on the Iraqi side of the border. By year's end 1947, the cumulative production of the entire field was 36 million barrels, of which 27 million had come from Naft Khaneh wells.

While the new government of Iraq had affirmed the concession in 1926, it forced a renegotiation in 1951 and gave the Anglo-Iranian Oil Company (new name given to the APOC) 7 years to increase production to 40,000bpd or lose the right. The two-well field only reached 12,000 and so on November 30, 1958, the government took full ownership of the field from AIOC, now renamed BP. At that time the average production had fallen back to 4,450bpd.

With an agreement signed December 25, 1951, the Iraqi government bought the Alwand refinery and the distribution facilities of Rafidain. But, the companies were given a concession to operate the refinery and distribution centers and also the projected Daura refinery until 1961.

The Khanaqin Oil Co., subsidiary of British Petroleum, handed over its marketing business to the Iraqi government on June 30, 1959. The company continued to operate BP's aviation service in Iraq and market certain specialty oil products.

In 1960, the Iraqi government formulated plans to build an 80 mile pipeline from Naft Khana to the Daura refinery near Baghdad and from there a 130 mile line to the K-3 station of the Kirkuk-Haifa oil pipeline to allow export of the oil via the northern route to the Mediterranean coast. Daily production at the time was estimated to be 4,000bpd on the Iraq side and a little more on the Iranian side. According to Russian experts, Naft Khana held another 49 to 126 million barrels and an additional 196 million barrels recoverable by water injection. The line to Baghdad was later built, but not the extension to K-3.

On April 26, 2018, in the fifth round of auctions held since Iraq had opened its oil and gas sector to foreign investments in 2009, the Ministry of Oil awarded a license for exploration and development of the Naft Khana block, along with the Huwieza block in Maysan, to the Chinese Geo-Jade Petroleum Corporation. In the same auction, the Chinese United Energy Group won the al-Sindibad block in Basra and the United Arab Emirates-based Crescent Petroleum won the Kilabat-Gumar and Khashim al-Hmer-Injana blocks in Diyala and Khudhr al-Maa in Basra . On February 21, 2023, 20-year contracts were signed to ratify the arrangements, which have the primary goal of reducing Iraq's dependence on imports from Iran for 40% of its own natural gas needs. Geo-Jade Petroleum released a tender for the supply of gas pipeline and accessories for the Naft Khana block on July 1, 2024.

Oil Production, Naft Khaneh field
	Barrels	Average barrels/day
1927	300,000	not full year
1928	468,450	1,283
1929	530,000	1,452
1930	606,000	1,660
1947		ca. 7000
1948	2,885,000	7,904
1949	2,864,520	7,848
1951	3,321,200	9,100
1952	3,739,200	10,245
1953	3,900,000	10,685

Production of the Alwand Refinery, FY ending March 31, barrels
	Gasoline	Kerosene	Fuel Oil
1931	106,908	108,164	365,500
1932	105,694	115,994	392,819
1933	100,505	111,345	413,966
