= Anglo-Persian Oil Company =

English energy company founded in 1908

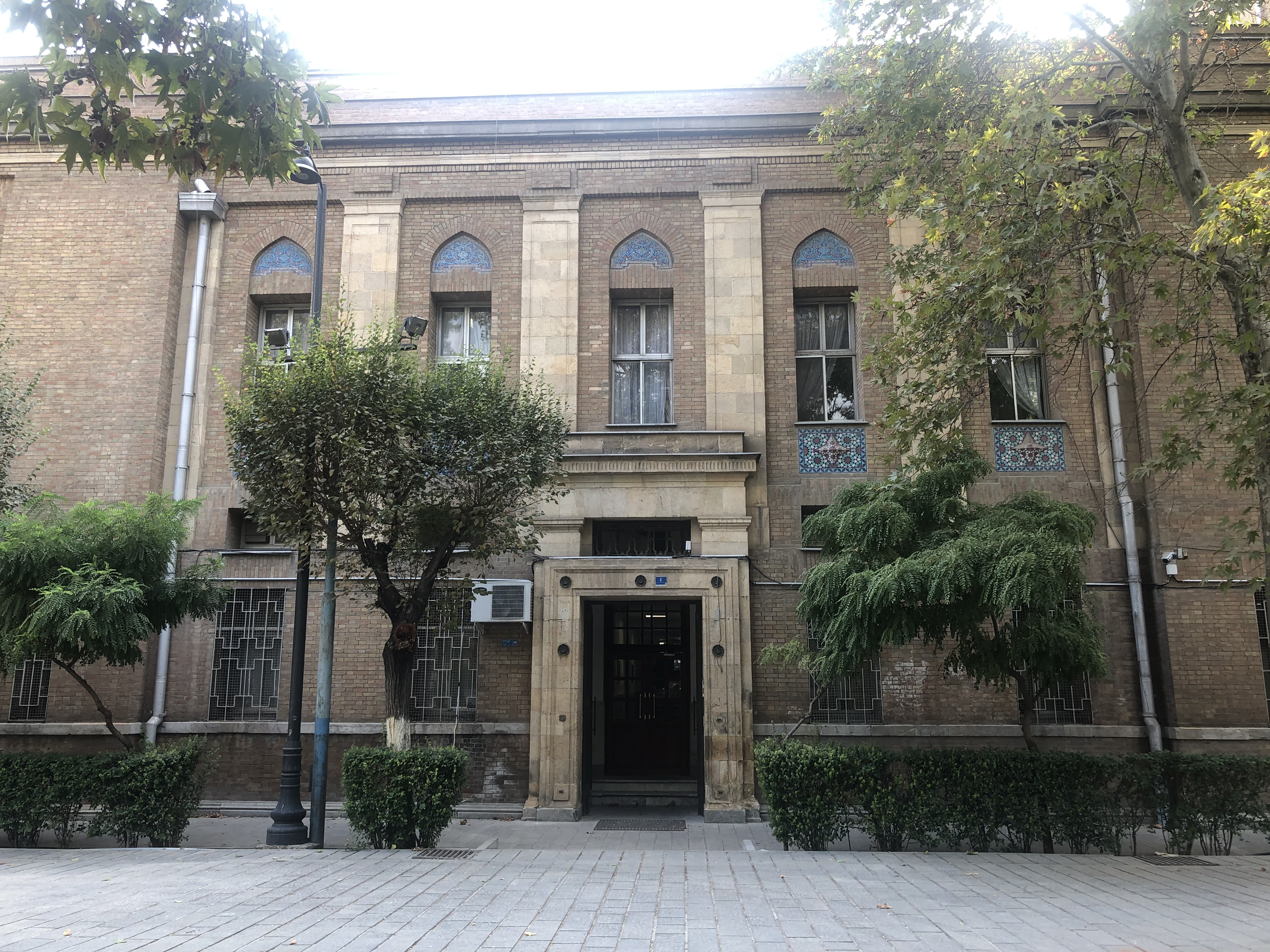
- The former Anglo-Persian Oil Company building (now Foreign Ministry No. 3) in Tehran
- Industry: Petroleum
- Founded: 14 April 1909
- Founders: William Knox D'Arcy; Charles Greenway
- Defunct: 16 December 1954; 71 years ago
- Fate: Nationalised by the Iranian government
- Successor: National Iranian Oil Company; BP
- Headquarters: Tehran, Imperial State of Iran
- Area served: Iran
- Products: Gasoline, motor oils
- Owner: Government of the United Kingdom (51%)

The Anglo-Persian Oil Company (APOC; Persian: شرکت نفت ایران و انگلیس) was a British company founded in 1909 following the discovery of a large oil field in Masjed Soleiman, Persia (Iran). The British government purchased 51% of the company in 1914, gaining a controlling number of shares, effectively nationalizing the company. It was the first company to extract petroleum from Iran. In 1935 APOC was renamed the Anglo-Iranian Oil Company (AIOC) when Reza Shah formally asked foreign countries to refer to Persia by its endonym Iran.

In 1954, it was renamed again, becoming The British Petroleum Company, one of the antecedents of the modern BP public limited company. The government of Mohammad Mosaddegh nationalized the company's local infrastructure assets and gave the new company the name National Iranian Oil Company.

== The D'Arcy oil concession ==
=== Exploration and discovery ===
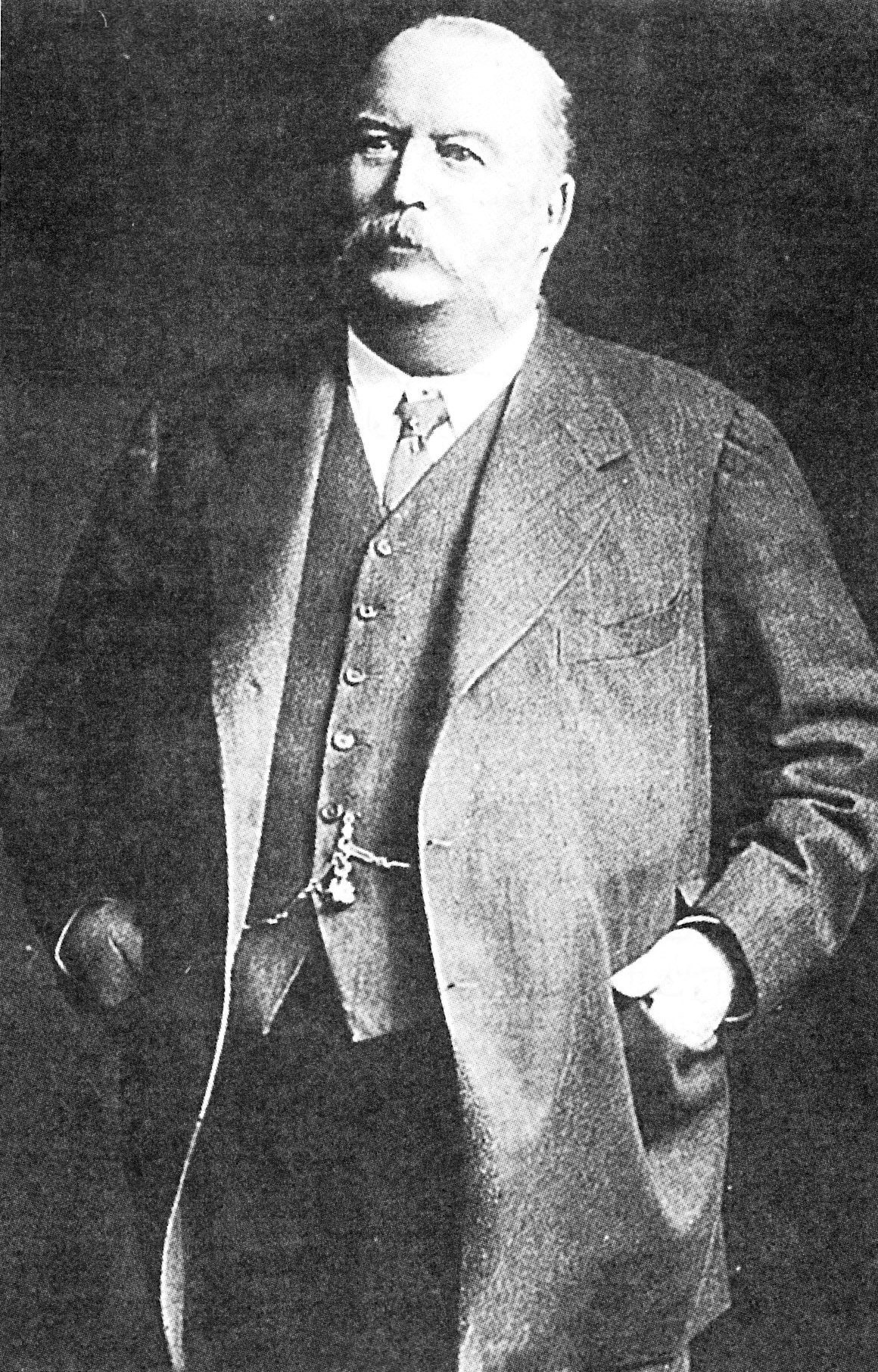
William Knox D'Arcy negotiated rights to prospect for oil in most of the Iran territory.

In 1901, William Knox D'Arcy, a millionaire London socialite, negotiated an oil concession with Mozaffar al-Din Shah Qajar of Persia. He financed this with capital he had made from his shares in the highly profitable Mount Morgan Mine in Queensland, Australia. D'Arcy assumed exclusive rights to prospect for oil for 60 years in a vast tract of territory including most of Persia. In exchange the Shah received £20,000 (£2.1 million today), an equal amount in shares of D'Arcy's company, and a promise of 16% of future profits.

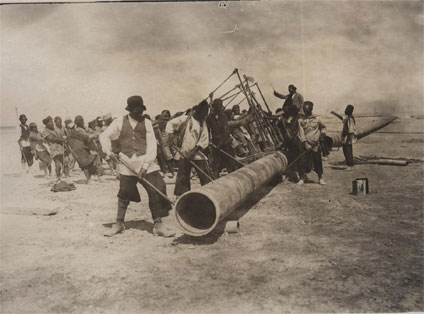
Workers of the APOC in 1908

D'Arcy hired geologist George Bernard Reynolds to do the prospecting in the Persian desert. Conditions were extremely harsh: "small pox raged, bandits and warlords ruled, water was all but unavailable, and temperatures often soared past 50°C". After several years of prospecting, D'Arcy's fortune dwindled away and he was forced to sell most of his rights to a Glasgow-based syndicate, the Burmah Oil Company.

By 1908, having sunk more than £500,000 into their Persian venture and found no oil, D'Arcy and Burmah decided to abandon exploration in Persia. In early May 1908, they sent Reynolds a telegram telling him that they had run out of money and ordering him to "cease work, dismiss the staff, dismantle anything worth the cost of transporting to the coast for re-shipment, and come home." Reynolds delayed following these orders and in a stroke of luck, struck oil shortly after, on 26 May 1908. However, according to Arnold Wilson, "The service rendered by G.B. Reynolds to the British empire and to British industry and to Persia was never recognized."

=== Creation of APOC ===
On 14 April 1909, Burmah Oil created the Anglo-Persian Oil Company (APOC) as a subsidiary and also sold shares to the public.

Volume production of Persian oil products eventually started in 1913 from a refinery built at Abadan, for its first 50 years the largest oil refinery in the world (see Abadan Refinery). In 1913, shortly before World War I, APOC managers negotiated with a new customer, Winston Churchill, who was then First Lord of the Admiralty. Churchill, as a part of a three-year expansion program, sought to modernise Britain's Royal Navy by abandoning the use of coal-fired steamships and adopting oil as fuel for its ships instead. Although Britain had large reserves of coal, oil had the advantage of greater energy density, allowing a longer steaming range for a ship for the same bunker capacity. Furthermore, Churchill wanted to free Britain from its reliance on the Standard Oil and Shell oil companies. In exchange for secure oil supplies for its ships, the British government injected new capital into the company and, in doing so, acquired a controlling interest in APOC. The contract that was set up between the British Government and APOC was to hold for 20 years. The British government also became a de facto hidden power behind the oil company.

APOC took a 50% share in a new Turkish Petroleum Company (TPC) organised in 1912 by Calouste Gulbenkian to explore and develop oil resources in the Ottoman Empire. After a hiatus caused by World War I, it reformed and struck an immense gusher at Kirkuk, Mandatory Iraq in 1927, renaming itself the Iraq Petroleum Company.

In 1920, the APOC also acquired a northern oil concession that had been formally granted in 1916 to a former Russian subject, the Georgian Akaki Khoshtaria. To manage this new acquisition, the APOC formed a new subsidiary, the North Persia Oil Company. Persia, however, refused to accept the new company, giving rise to a lingering dispute over the northern Persian oil.

In 1923, oil was found at the Iraqi/Persian border in Naft Khana/Naft-i-Shah (now Diyala Province), which was considered a "transferred territory" along the Persia-Iraq border. The Khanaqin Oil Company was registered in London as an APOC subsidiary. The quantities henceforth produced in the field were rather insignificant. Naft Khana reverted to the Iraqi government in 1958 after failing to achieve a contractual obligation of 40,000 bbl/day.

During this period, Persian popular opposition to the D'Arcy oil concession and royalty terms whereby Persia only received 16% of net profits was widespread. Since industrial development and planning, as well as other fundamental reforms were predicated on oil revenues, the government's lack of control over the oil industry served to accentuate the Persian government's misgivings regarding the manner in which APOC conducted its affairs in Persia. Such a pervasive atmosphere of dissatisfaction seemed to suggest that a radical revision of the concession terms would be possible. Moreover, owing to the introduction of reforms that improved fiscal order in Persia, APOC's past practice of cutting off advances in oil royalties when its demands were not met had lost much of its sting.

In 1923, Burmah employed Winston Churchill as a paid consultant to lobby the British government to allow APOC to have exclusive rights to Persian oil resources, which were subsequently granted. In 1925, TPC received concession in the Mesopotamian oil resources from the Iraqi government under British mandate. TPC finally struck oil in Iraq on 14 October 1927. In 1928, the APOC's shareholding in TPC, which by now was named Iraq Petroleum Company (IPC), would be reduced to 23.75%; as the result of the changing geopolitics post Ottoman Empire break-up, and the Red Line Agreement. APOC was a 50% co-owner and responsible for the operation of the refinery completed in 1939 at the Haifa terminal of the IPC-owned Kirkuk-Haifa oil pipeline.

=== Renegotiating of terms by Iran ===
The attempt to revise the terms of the oil concession on a more favourable basis for Persia led to protracted negotiations that took place in Tehran, Lausanne, London and Paris between Abdolhossein Teymourtash, Persia/Iran's Minister of Court 1925–32 and its nominal Minister of Foreign Affairs, and the Chairman of APOC, John Cadman, spanned 1928–32. The overarching argument for revisiting the terms of the D'Arcy Agreement on the Persian side was that its national wealth was being squandered by a concession that was granted in 1901 by a previous non-constitutional government forced to agree to inequitable terms under duress. In order to buttress his position in talks with the British, Teymourtash retained the expertise of French and Swiss oil experts.

Persia demanded a revision of the terms whereby Persia would be granted 25% of APOC's total shares. To counter British objections, Teymourtash would state that "if this had been a new concession, the Persian Government would have insisted not on 25 percent but on a 50–50 basis. Teymourtash also asked for a minimum guaranteed interest of 12.5% on dividends from the shares of the company, plus two shillings per ton of oil produced. In addition, he specified that the company was to reduce the existing area of the concession. The intent behind reducing the area of the concession was to push APOC operations to the southwest of the country so as to make it possible for Persia to approach and lure other oil companies to develop oilfields on more equitable terms in areas not part of APOC's area of concession.

Apart from demanding a more equitable share of the profits of the company, an issue that did not escape Teymourtash's attention was that the flow of transactions between APOC and its various subsidiaries deprived Iran of gaining an accurate and reliable appreciation of APOC's full profits. As such, he demanded that the company register itself in Tehran as well as London, and the exclusive rights of transportation of the oil be returned to the Iranian government. In fact in the midst of the negotiations in 1930, the Iranian National Consultative Assembly approved a bill whereby foreign companies would be required to pay a 4 percent tax on prospective profits earned in Iran.

In 1931, Teymourtash, while travelling to Europe to enroll Crown Prince Mohammed Reza Pahlavi at a Swiss boarding school, decided to use the occasion to attempt to conclude the negotiations. According to Cadman, Teymourtash worked feverishly and diligently to resolve all outstanding issues, but succeeded only in securing an agreement in principle while key figures and lump sum payments were not settled.

However, while Teymourtash was led to believe that after four years of exhaustive and detailed discussions, he had succeeded in navigating the negotiations on the road to a conclusive end; the latest negotiations in London were to prove nothing more than a cul de sac.

Matters came to a head in 1931, when the combined effects of over-abundant oil supplies on the global markets and the economic destabilization of the Great Depression, led to fluctuations which drastically reduced annual payments accruing to Iran to a fifth of what it had received in the previous year. In that year APOC informed the Iranian government that its royalties for the year would amount to a mere £366,782 while in the same period the company's income taxes paid to the British government amounted to approximately £1,000,000. Furthermore, while the company's profits declined 36 percent for the year, the revenues paid to the Iranian government pursuant to the company's accounting practices decreased by 76 percent. Such a precipitous drop in royalties appeared to confirm suspicions of bad faith, and Teymourtash indicated that the parties would have to revisit negotiations.

However, Reza Shah was soon to assert his authority by dramatically inserting himself into the negotiations. The monarch attended a meeting of the Council of Ministers in November 1932, and after publicly rebuking Teymourtash for his failure to secure an agreement, dictated a letter to cabinet cancelling the D'Arcy Agreement. The Iranian government notified APOC that it would cease further negotiations and demanded cancellation of the D'Arcy concession. Rejecting the cancellation, the British government espoused the claim on behalf of APOC and brought the dispute before the Permanent Court of International Justice at the Hague, asserting that it regarded itself "as entitled to take all such measures as the situation may demand for the Company's protection." The Permanent Court of International Justice was a tool of the League of Nations which, in turn, was dominated by the victors of World War I. At this point, Hassan Taqizadeh, had been appointed the new Iranian Minister entrusted with the task of assuming responsibility for the oil dossier. In modern political history, Taqizadeh is known as a secular politician who believed that "outwardly and inwardly, in body and in spirit, Iran must become Europeanized". Taqizadeh was to intimate to the British that the cancellation was simply meant to expedite negotiations and that it would constitute political suicide for Iran to withdraw from negotiations.

After the dispute between the two countries was taken up at the Hague, the Czechoslovak Foreign Minister who was appointed mediator put the matter into abeyance to allow the contending parties to attempt to resolve the dispute. Ironically, Reza Shah who had stood firm in demanding the abolishment of the D'Arcy concession, suddenly acquiesced to British demands, much to the chagrin and disappointment of his Cabinet. A new agreement with the Anglo-Persian Oil Company was agreed to after Cadman visited Iran in April 1933 and was granted a private audience with the Shah. A new agreement was ratified by the National Consultative Assembly on May 28, 1933, and received Royal assent the following day.

=== 1933 agreement ===
According to Daniel Yergin, "By the end of April 1933, a new agreement was finally forged. The concession area was reduced by three-quarters. Persia was guaranteed a fixed royalty of four shillings per ton, which protected it against fluctuations in oil prices. At the same time, it would receive 20 percent of the company's worldwide profits that were actually distributed to shareholders above a certain minimum sum. In addition, a minimum annual payment of £750,000, irrespective of other developments, was guaranteed. The royalties for 1931 and 1932 were to be recalculated on the new basis, and the 'Persianization' of the workforce was to be accelerated. Meanwhile, the duration of the concession was extended from 1961 to 1993." By 1950, Abadan had become the world's largest refinery.

The Anglo-Persian Oil Company continued its large Persian operations although it changed its name to the Anglo-Iranian Oil Company in 1935. In spite of diversification the AIOC still relied heavily on its Iranian oil fields for three-quarters of its supplies, and controlled all oil in Iran.

== Nationalisation and coup ==
=== Discontent in Iran ===
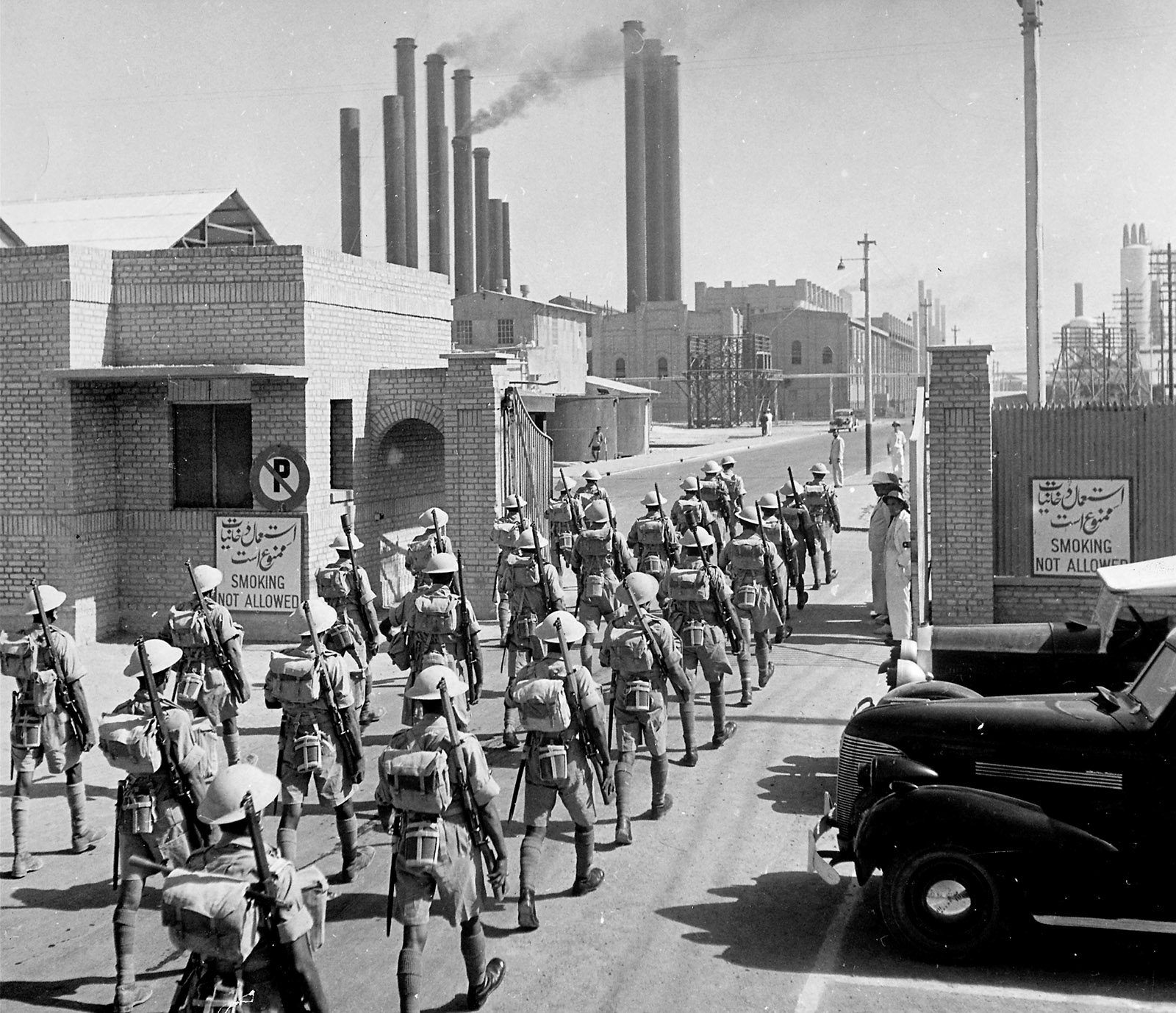
Indian soldiers march into the Abadan Refinery, Operation Countenance, 25 August 1941

Under the 1933 agreement with Reza Shah, the AIOC promised to give labourers better pay, more chances for advancement, build schools, hospitals, roads and a telephone system. AIOC did not fulfill these promises.

In August 1941, the Allied powers Britain and the Soviet Union invaded and occupied Iran in order to secure the oilfields and open a secure supply route to the USSR. The Persian Corridor sent over 4 million tonnes of American Lend-Lease and other material alone. Reza Shah was forced to abdicate in favour of his young son who they perceived would be far less able to act against their interests.

Following World War II, nationalistic sentiments were on the rise in the Middle East, the most notable example being Iranian nationalism. AIOC and the pro-western Iranian government led by Prime Minister Ali Razmara, initially resisted nationalist pressure to revise AIOC's concession terms still further in Iran's favour. In May 1949, Britain offered a "Supplemental oil agreement" to appease unrest in the country. The agreement guaranteed royalty payments would not drop below £4 million, reduced the area in which it would be allowed to drill, and promised more Iranians would be trained for administrative positions. The agreement, however, gave Iran neither a "greater voice in company's management", nor the right to audit the company books. In addition, Iranian royalties from oil were not expected to ever drop to the proposed guarantee of £4 million and the reduced area covered all of the productive oilfields. When the Iranian Prime Minister tried to argue with AIOC head Sir William Fraser, Fraser "dismissed him" and flew back to the UK.

In late December 1950, word reached Tehran that the American-owned Arabian American Oil Company had agreed to share profits with Saudis on a 50-50 basis. The UK Foreign Office rejected the idea of any similar agreement for AIOC.

On 7 March 1951, Prime Minister Haj Ali Razmara was assassinated by the Fada'iyan-e Islam, a Shia terrorist organization that supported nationalization of the AIOC. As Prime Minister, Razmara successfully resisted efforts by the pro-nationalization opposition party, the National Front. The public's discontent over the lack of progress regarding the AIOC and the D'Arcy concession became even more apparent from the obvious lack of mourning for Razmara. A raucous protest walkout by newspaper reporters ensued when a visiting American diplomat urged "reason as well as enthusiasm" to deal with the imminent British embargo against Iran.

By 1951, Iranian support for nationalisation of the AIOC was significant. Grievances included the small fraction of revenues Iran received. In 1947 for example, the AIOC reported after-tax profits of £40 million ($112 million), but the agreement entitled Iran to just £7 million, 17.5% of profits. Britain was profiting far more from Iranian oil than Iran was. In addition, conditions for Iranian oil workers and their families were poor. The director of Iran's Petroleum Institute wrote:

Wages were 50 cents a day. There was no vacation pay, no sick leave, no disability compensation. The workers lived in a shanty town called Kaghazabad, or Paper City, without running water or electricity, ... In winter the earth flooded and became a flat, perspiring lake. The mud in town was knee-deep, and ... when the rains subsided, clouds of nipping, small-winged flies rose from the stagnant water to fill the nostrils .... Summer was worse. ... The heat was torrid ... sticky and unrelenting—while the wind and sandstorms shipped off the desert hot as a blower. The dwellings of Kaghazabad, cobbled from rusted oil drums hammered flat, turned into sweltering ovens. ... In every crevice hung the foul, sulfurous stench of burning oil .... in Kaghazad there was nothing—not a tea shop, not a bath, not a single tree. The tiled reflecting pool and shaded central square that were part of every Iranian town, ... were missing here. The unpaved alleyways were emporiums for rats.

=== Nationalisation ===
Later in March 1951, the Iranian parliament, the Majlis, voted to nationalise the Anglo-Iranian Oil Company (AIOC) and its holdings. In April, Mohammed Mossadegh, leader of the National Front and a champion of nationalisation, was elected prime minister; sparking the Abadan Crisis.

Mossadegh broke off negotiations with the AIOC in July 1951, after the AIOC threatened to pull its employees out of Iran, and Britain warned tanker owners that "the receipts from the Iranian government would not be accepted on the world market." The British ratcheted up the pressure on the Iranian government and drew up a detailed plan of an invasion to occupy Abadan, code named "Buccaneer". That plan was ultimately rejected by both Clement Attlee and Winston Churchill. US President Harry S. Truman and US ambassador to Iran Henry F. Grady opposed intervention in Iran but needed Britain's support for the Korean War.

The United States believed it was possible to reach a face-saving agreement with Mossadegh, under which actual control and management of the organisation would remain with the AIOC. Truman sent Averell Harriman to Iran to convince Mossadegh of such a scheme. Arriving in Tehran on 15 July 1951, Harriman claimed that the United States accepted nationalization of the concession but insisted on having "a foreign-owned company to act as an agent of NIOC in conducting operations in Iran". Harriman's British counterpart the Lord Privy Seal, Richard Stokes, signaled the UK also favoured such an arrangement. Mossadegh however adamantly opposed the idea, believing it would only "revive the former AIOC in a new form." Mossadegh's opposition caused the British to conclude that he had to go. Officials at the Ministry of Fuel and Power wrote in September 1951:

If Dr. Mussadiq [sic] resigns or is replaced, it is just possible that we shall be able to get away from outright nationalization ... It would certainly be dangerous to offer greater real control of oil operations in Persia. Although something might be done to put more of a Persian facade on the setup, we must not forget that the Persians are not so far wrong when they say that all our proposals are, in fact, merely dressing up the AIOC control in other clothing ... Any real concession on this point is impossible. If we reached settlement on Mussadiq's terms, we would jeopardise not only British but also American oil interests throughout the world. We would destroy prospects of the investments of foreign capital in backward countries. We would strike a fatal blow to international law. We have a duty to stay and use force to protect our interest ... We must force the Shah to bring down Mussadiq.

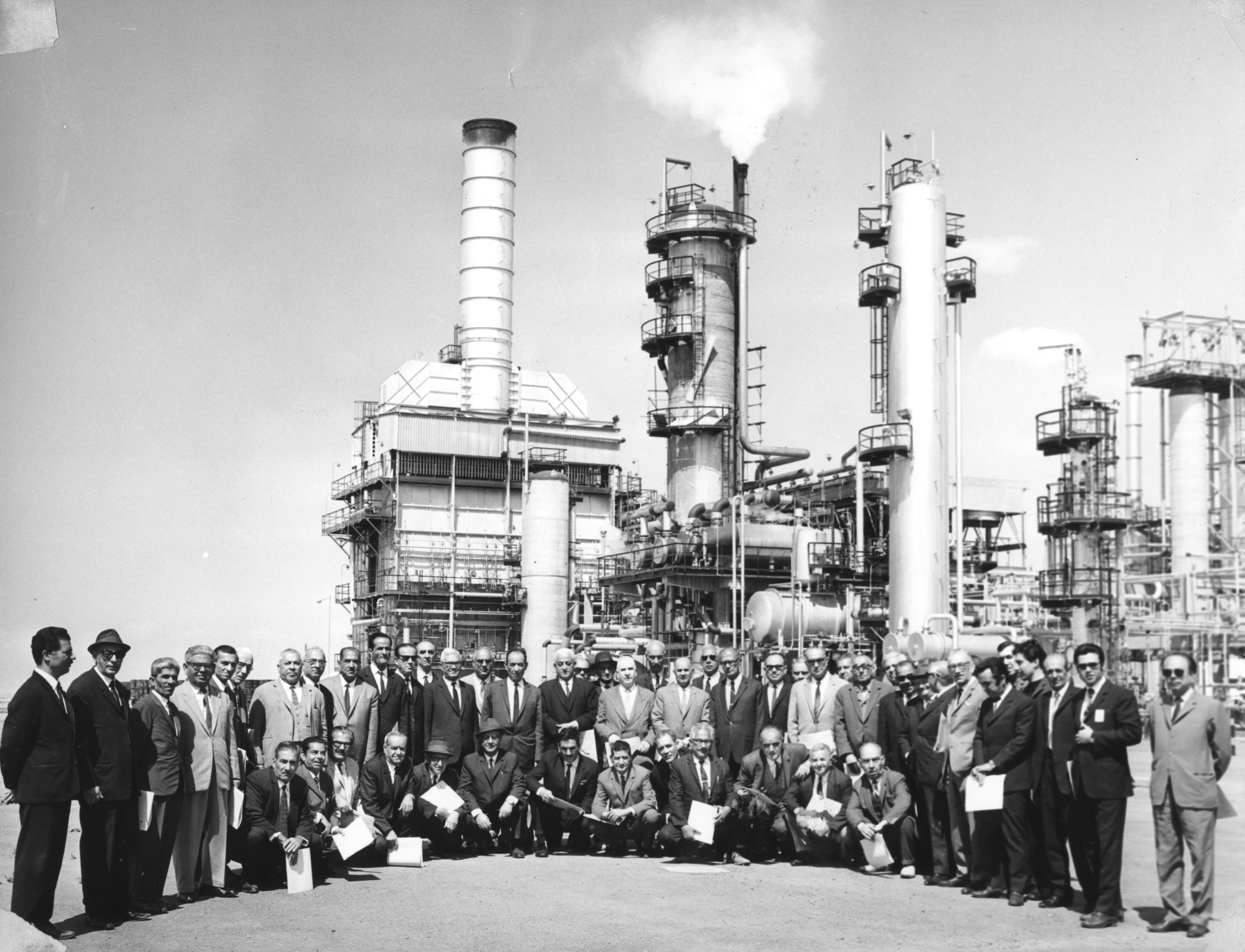
People at an APOC refinery in the 1950s

In October 1951, Mossadegh paid a visit to the United States, after the US embassy in Tehran had accidentally invited him (the invitation was actually meant for Churchill). There, in discussions with George C. McGhee, Mossadegh surprisingly agreed to a complex settlement, under which Iran would own the refinery in Kermanshah and administer the oilfields. The much larger Abadan Refinery was sold to a non-British company and the proceeds given to the AIOC as compensation. Further, the National Iranian Oil Company (NIOC) would sell an annual minimum of 30 million tons of crude oil to the AIOC for the next fifteen years. The board of the NIOC would consist of three Iranians and four foreigners and would conduct most of its transactions using in sterling. Mossadegh prolonged his visit on Washington's urging because the US administration believed that the incoming Conservative government of Winston Churchill would be agreeable to that deal. However, the deal was rejected by the British, who believed Mossadegh's downfall was imminent. Several major oil companies, such as Socony-Vacuum and Shell, assured the Ministry of Fuel and Power that they were also opposed to the agreement.

Britain attempted to settle the dispute through the International Court of Justice (ICJ), but Iran contended that the issue lay outside the court's jurisdiction. On 22 July 1952, "the court accepted the Iranian argument that the dispute was between the Iranian government and a foreign corporation, not the British government; since the dispute was not about a treaty or convention with a foreign government, it was subject to Iranian domestic law".

As the months went on, the crisis became acute. By mid-1952, an attempt by the Shah to replace Mossadegh backfired, and led to riots against the Shah and perceived foreign intervention. After that, Mossadegh returned with even greater prestige. At the same time however, his coalition was weakening, because Britain’s boycott/blockade of Iranian oil exports eliminated a major source of state revenue; many Iranians grew poorer and thus unhappier by the day.

=== Coup ===
Mossadegh expelled the British embassy in October 1952, checking further efforts by the UK government to internally undermine his regime. Britain appealed to US anti-communist sentiment, depicting both Mossadegh and Iran as unstable and likely to fall under communist influence as they continued to weaken. It was alleged that if Iran fell, the "enormous assets" of "Iranian oil production and reserves" would come under communist control, as would "in short order the other areas of the Middle East".

The anti-Mossadegh plan was orchestrated by the CIA under the code-name "Operation Ajax", and by SIS (MI6) as "Operation Boot". The CIA utilized information obtain from British intelligence and bribed politicians, soldiers, mobsters, and journalists to destabilize the country and consolidate opposition to Mosaddegh. The Shah re-asserted his position and forcibly removed Mosaddegh from office. General Fazlollah Zahedi led tanks to Mosaddegh's residence and arrested him for treason. On 21 December 1953, Mosaddegh was sentenced three years' solitary confinement in a military prison, well short of the death sentence requested by prosecutors. He was then kept under house arrest at his Ahmadabad residence, until his death on 5 March 1967.

=== Consortium ===
With a pro-Western Shah and the new pro-Western Prime Minister, Fazlollah Zahedi, Iranian oil began flowing again and the Anglo-Iranian Oil Company, which changed its name to British Petroleum (BP) in 1954, tried to return to its old position. However, Iranian public opinion was so opposed that the new government could not permit it.

Under pressure from the United States, BP was forced to accept membership in a consortium of companies which would bring Iranian oil back on the international market. BP was incorporated in London in 1954 as a holding company called Iranian Oil Participants Ltd (IOP). The founding members of IOP included BP (40%), Gulf Oil (8%), Shell (14%), and Compagnie Française des Pétroles (now TotalEnergies SE, 6%). The four Aramco partners — Standard Oil of California (SoCal, later Chevron), Standard Oil of New Jersey (later Exxon), Standard Oil Co. of New York (later Mobil), and Texaco – each held an 8% stake in the holding company. In addition, these companies paid Anglo-Iranian about $90 million for their 60 percent share in the consortium, and a further $500 million, paid out of a ten cent per barrel royalty. The Shah signed the agreement on 29 October 1954, and oil flowed from Abadan the next day. Within a few months each of the American companies contributed 1 percent to Iricon, a consortium made up of nine independent American companies, which included Phillips, Richfield, Standard of Ohio, and Ashland.

The founding members of the IOP at various stages came to be known as the Supermajors, the "Seven Sisters", or the "Consortium for Iran" cartel, and dominated the global petroleum industry from the mid-1940s to the 1970s. Until the oil crisis of 1973, the members of the Seven Sisters controlled around 85% of the world's known oil reserves.

All IOP members acknowledged that the National Iranian Oil Company (NIOC) owned the oil and facilities in Iran, and IOP's role was to operate and manage them on behalf of NIOC. To facilitate that, IOP established two operating entities incorporated in the Netherlands, and both were delegated to NIOC. Similar to the Saudi-Aramco "50/50" agreement of 1950, the consortium agreed to share profits on a 50–50 basis with Iran, "but not to open its books to Iranian auditors or to allow Iranians onto its board of directors." The negotiations leading to the creation of the consortium, during 1954–55, was considered as a feat of skillful diplomacy for the Seven Sisters. Some viewed the move as leading to rising tensions with Iran, since it allowed IOP to divert and hide profits with ease—effectively controlling Iran's share of the profits.

== Subsidiary companies ==
- Scottish Oils Ltd (controlling %) - was established by Anglo-Persian in 1919 by merging five Scottish oil shale companies (Young's Paraffin Light & Mineral Oil Company, Broxburn Oil Company, Pumpherston Shale Oil Company, Oakbank Oil Company and James Ross & Company Philpstoun Oil Works), was a producer of shale oil. Shale oil production in Scotland ceased in the early 1960s but there was an unsuccessful attempt to revive it in 1973. The company was wound up on 15 December 2010. The Scottish Oil Agency Ltd was a distributing and selling organisation of Scottish Oils Ltd. A Scottish Oil Agency rail tanker is preserved at the Museum of the Scottish Shale Oil Industry.
- Aden Petroleum Refinery Ltd. - The $150 million 120,000bpd refinery began operations on August 4, 1954. Renamed BP Refinery (Aden) Ltd on June 1, 1956.
- Australasian Petroleum Refinery Ltd. - Founded in January 1953. The 70,000bpd Kwinana refinery at Fremantle began operations in February 1955. Renamed BP Refinery (Kwinana) Ltd. on June 1, 1956
- Australasian Petroleum Co Pty Ltd - was conducting exploration in Papua New Guinea in 1953.
- Bakhtiari Oil Co., Ltd. (100%)
- British Petroleum Co., Ltd. (100%)
- British Oil Bunkering Co., Ltd. (controlling %) - established on March 5, 1920 with a capital of £1,200,000.
- British Tanker Co., Ltd. (100%) - See below. renamed BP Tanker Co., Ltd. on June 1, 1956
- D'Arcy Exploration Co., Ltd. - Held APOC's stake in IPC, which was originally 47.5% in 1914 and eventually 23.75% after 1928. Renamed BP Exploration Co., Ltd. on June 1, 1956
- D'Arcy Kuwait Co., Ltd. (100%) - held a 50% interest in the Kuwait Oil Company, Gulf Kuwait Co. (Gulf Oil) held the other 50%. Renamed BP (Kuwait) Ltd. on June 1, 1956
- First Exploitation Co., Ltd. (100%)
- Grangemouth Petroleum Refinery Ltd. - renamed BP Refinery (Grangemouth) Ltd on June 1, 1956
- Homelight Oil Co., Ltd. (100%)
- Kent Oil Refinery Ltd. - Kent Refinery aka Isle of Grain refinery began operations in 1953. Renamed BP Refinery (Kent) Ltd on June 1, 1956
- National Oil Refineries, Ltd. (100%) - The Llandarcy Oil Refinery began operations in 1921. Renamed BP Refinery (Llandarcy) Ltd on June 1, 1956
- North Persian Oils Ltd. (controlling %)
- Petroleum Steamship Co., Ltd. (100%)
- Tanker Insurance Co., Ltd. (100%)
- Khanaqin Oil Company (100%) - established in 1925, began production from the minor Naft Khana field through a 24-mile pipeline to the Alwand refinery near Khanaqin in 1927. Sold the refinery to the government of Iraq in 1951 and lost the concession in 1958.
- Kermanshah Petroleum Oil Company (100%) - began production from the minor Naft-i-Shah field through a 158-mile pipeline to a refinery near Kermanshah in 1935.
- Oil Refineries Limited (50% AIOC, 50% Royal Dutch-Shell) - refinery at the southern terminal of the Kirkuk-Haifa oil pipeline began production in 1939.

== Tanker fleet ==
British Tanker Company Limited (BTC) was formed in 1915, after the Anglo-Persian Oil Company decided to become a fully self-contained operation, directly owning a fleet of tankers for sea transport. On formation, the BTC had an initial budget of $144,000 with which to build seven steam-powered tankers. The Company's first tanker was the British Emperor, which was launched in 1916. The names of the first seven ships, and all later additions to the fleet, bore the prefix British.

Over the next decade, the demand for oil grew throughout the developed world, and the BTC expanded accordingly. By 1924, the fleet numbered 60 ships, with the 60th being the flagship, 10,762 deadweight tonnes (dwt), British Aviator. She was the BTC’s first diesel engine oil tanker, and at that time the most powerful single-screw motor ship in the world.

The economic depression of the early 1930s saw rising unemployment amongst merchant navies around the world. However, the BTC undertook a series of strategic mergers, and coupled with the continued support of the Shah of Iran, the APOC succeeded in strengthening its position within the industry.

In 1939, the British government chartered the whole fleet of 93 tankers to supply fuel to its armed forces during the Second World War. The fleet lost a total of 42 ships sunk during the war.

Within a year of peace in 1945, the BTC fleet had returned to its pre-war total of 93 vessels. The recovery continued with the building of 57 new tankers, each 12,000 dwt, which increased the tonnage of oil transported from Abadan refinery in Iran, whilst remaining light enough for the tankers to pass through the shallow waters of the Suez Canal.

In 1946, Princess Elizabeth launched the tanker British Princess for the APOC, and was given a sapphire brooch to mark the occasion.

In 1951, however, the situation changed dramatically, when the Iranian oil industry was nationalised, and the APOC removed all its staff from Iran.

== See also ==
- Abdolhossein Teymourtash
- Anglo-Persian Agreement
- British foreign policy in the Middle East
- D'Arcy Exploration Co, UK.
- Mohammad Reza Pahlavi
- Dariush Forouhar
- Hossein Fatemi
- John Cadman, 1st Baron Cadman
- Iranian Revolution
- Nissho Maru Incident
- White Revolution
- Suez Crisis
