= D'Arcy Concession =

1901 Persian grant of oil to businessman

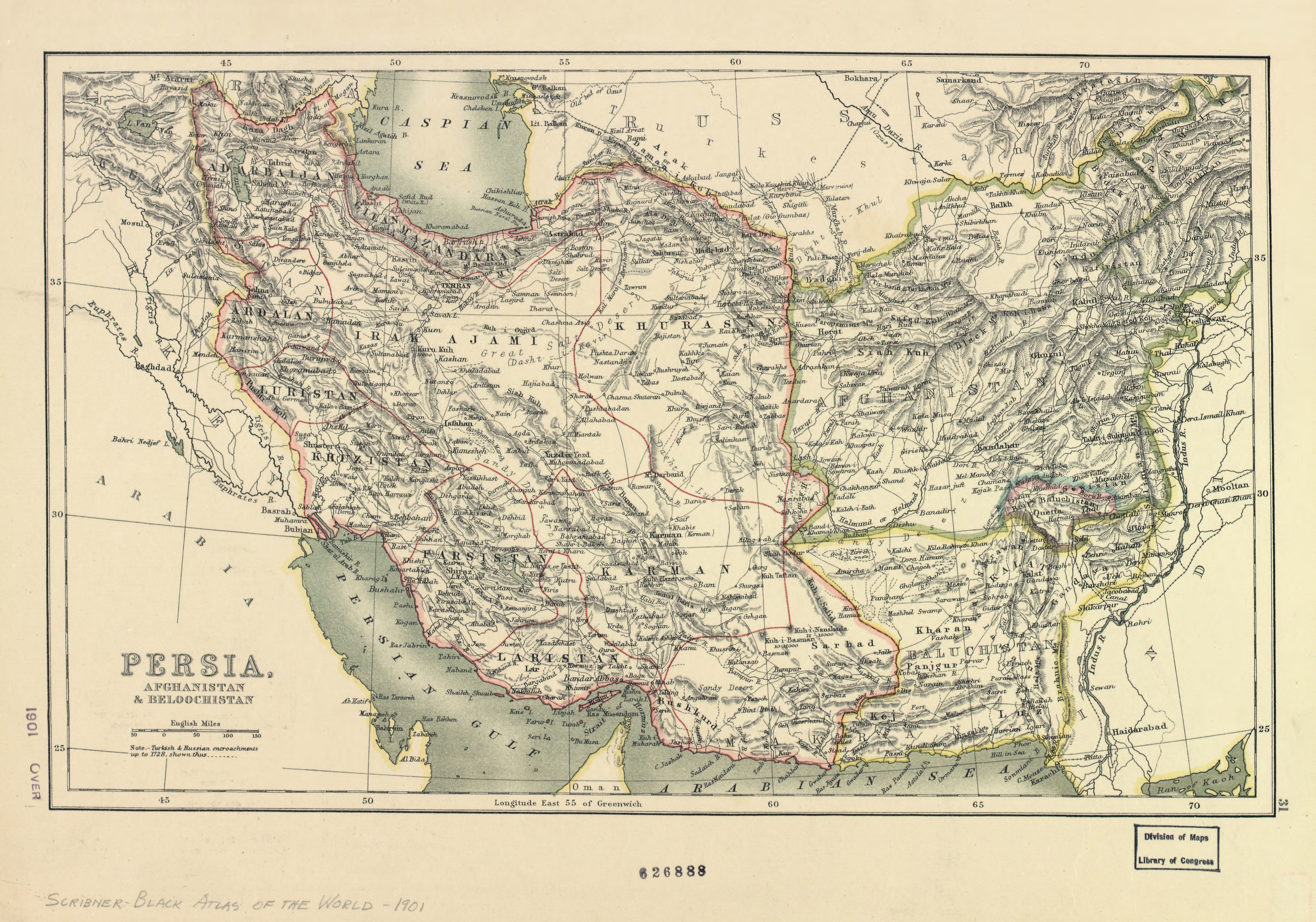
Map of Persia, Afghanistan and Baluchistan, 1901

The D'Arcy Concession (Persian: امتیازنامه دارسی, romanized: Emtiâznâmeh-ye Darsi) was a petroleum oil concession that was signed in 1901 between William Knox D'Arcy and Mozaffar ad-Din Shah Qajar of Persia. The oil concession gave D'Arcy the exclusive rights to prospect for oil in Persia (Iran). During this exploration for oil, D'Arcy and his team encountered financial troubles and struggled to find sellable amounts of oil. Facing high costs, they were about to give up but eventually struck large commercial quantities of oil in 1908. The Burmah Oil Company created the Anglo-Persian Oil Company to take over the concession in 1909.

The D'Arcy Concession was cancelled in 1932.

== William Knox D'Arcy ==
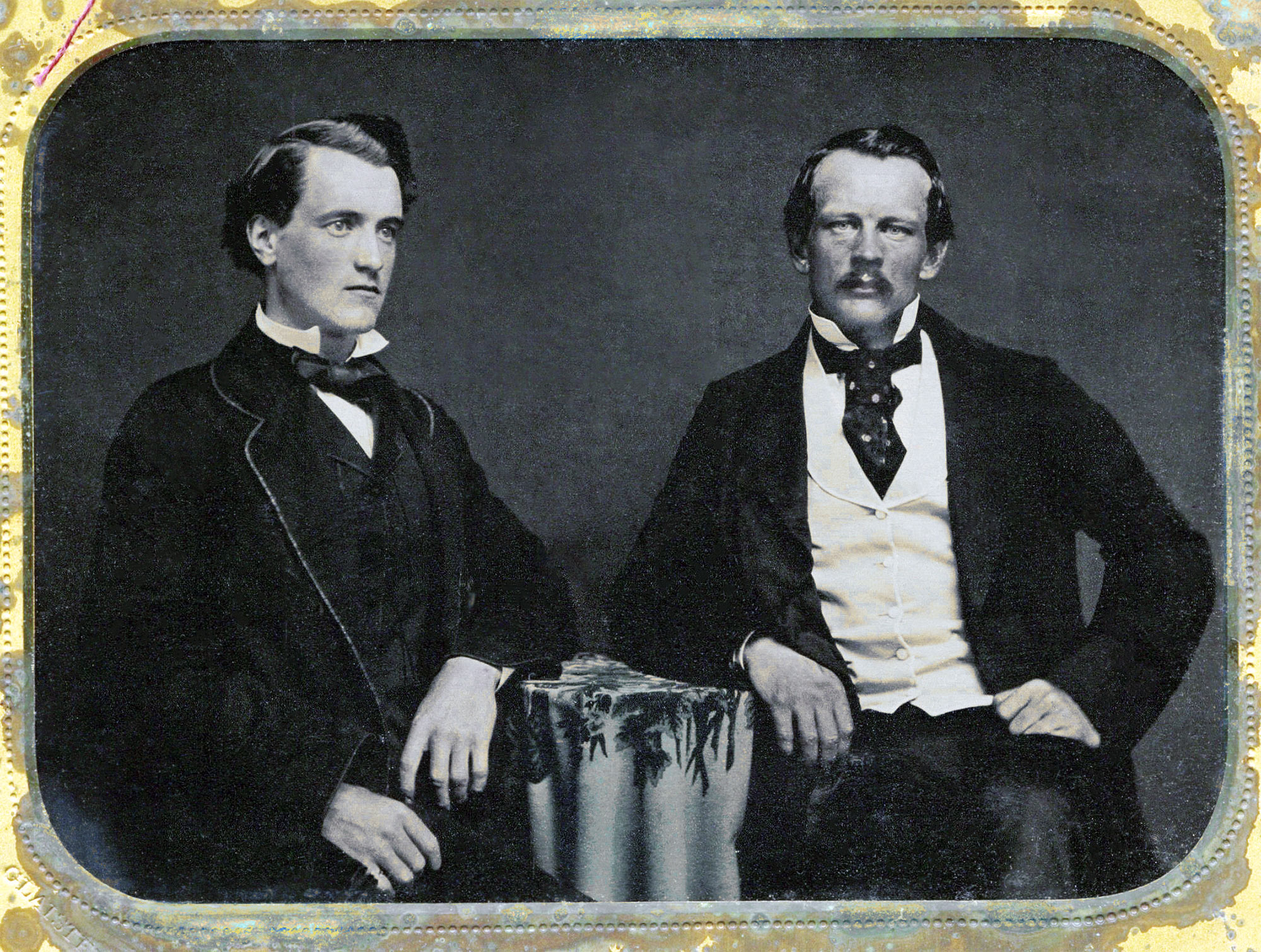
A young William Knox D'Arcy circa 1885

William Knox D'Arcy was born in Devon, England in 1849. When he immigrated to Australia, he took a chance by organizing a syndicate to reopen and restore the Mount Morgan Mine to operation. Indeed, the mine still had plentiful gold yet to be found. This made D'Arcy a very wealthy man and he returned to England looking for a new investment and to take another chance. This investment and chance would eventually be to prospect for oil in Persia and the venture later became known as the D'Arcy Concession.

== Oil potential in Persia ==
During the 1890s, research and reports were being published that Persia had great oil potential. Some of D'Arcy's advisers made him aware of these reports and promised him wealth if he invested in this venture. D'Arcy agreed and sent out representatives to Tehran to win a concession that would give him the exclusive rights to prospect for oil in Persia. On 16 April 1901, negotiations commenced between D'Arcy's representatives and Shah Mozaffar al-Din Shah over the potential oil concession.

== British-Russia rivalry in Persia ==
During the 19th century, Great Britain and Russia were engaged in a rivalry for influence in Persia, in an episode that would later be referred to by authors of literature and history as the Great Game. Both powers believed that Persia and the Middle East more broadly were important to their imperial economic and military interests. Russia wanted to expand its influence into Persia, and Britain feared that Russian success would constitute a direct threat towards its precious Indian possessions. These two countries struggled for influence in Persia through numerous concessions and loans throughout the 19th century.

Many British government officials believed that this was where the D'Arcy concession could help. A British oil concession would help tip the balance of power in Persia in Britain's favour. As a result, the British government and its officials in Persia gave full political support to D'Arcy and his potential oil concession. Once the Russians found out about the negotiations between D'Arcy and the Shah, the Russian government tried to block the impending negotiations. The Russians were able to slow the pace of the agreement until D'Arcy's representative in Tehran offered the Shah an extra £5,000 to close the agreement.

== The oil concession ==
The extra £5,000 succeeded in influencing the Shah to sign the concession. At Tehran's Sahebgharaniyeh Palace on 28 May 1901, Mozzafar al-Din Shah signed the 18 point concession. This 18 point concession would give D'Arcy the exclusive rights to prospect, explore, exploit, transport and sell natural gas, petroleum, asphalt and mineral waxes in Persia. This concession also granted D'Arcy these rights for a 60-year period and it covered an area of 1,242,000 square kilometres (480,000 sq mi). This covered three quarters of the country and D'Arcy purposely excluded the five most northerly provinces from the concession because of their proximity to Russia. In return, the Shah received £20,000 cash, another £20,000 worth of shares, and 16 percent of annual net profits, from the operating companies of the concession.

=== The 18 Articles ===
Between the Government of His Imperial Majesty the Shah of Persia, of the one part, and William Knox D'Arcy, of independent means, residing in London at No. 42, Grosvenor Square (hereinafter called "the Concessionaire") of the other part;

The following has by these presents been agreed on and arranged:

Article 1. The Government of His Imperial Majesty the Shah grants to the concessionnaire by these presents a special and exclusive privilege to search for, obtain, exploit, develop, render suitable for trade, carry away and sell natural gas petroleum, asphalt and ozokerite throughout the whole extent of the Persian Empire for a term of sixty years as from the date of these presents.

Article 2. This privilege shall comprise the exclusive right of laying the pipelines necessary from the deposits where there may be found one or several of the said products up to the Persian Gulf, as also the necessary distributing branches. It shall also comprise the right of constructing and maintaining all and any wells, reservoirs, stations, pump services, accumulation services and distribution services, factories and other works and arrangements that may be deemed necessary.

Article 3. The Imperial Persian Government grants gratuitously to the concessionnaire all uncultivated lands belonging to the State which the concessionnaire's engineers may deem necessary for the construction of the whole or any part of the above-mentioned works. As for cultivated lands belonging to the State, the concessionnaire must purchase them at the fair and current price of the province.

The Government also grants to the concessionnaire the right of acquiring all and any other lands or buildings necessary for the said purpose, with the consent of the proprietors, on such conditions as may be arranged between him and them without their being allowed to make demands of a nature to surcharge the prices ordinarily current for lands situate in their respective localities.

Holy places with all their dependencies within a radius of 200 Persian archines are formally excluded.

Article 4. As three petroleum mines situate at Schouster, Kassre-Chirine, in the Province of Kermanschah, and Daleki, near Bouchir, are at present let to private persons and produce an annual revenue of two thousand tomans for the benefit of the Government, it has been agreed that the three aforesaid mines shall be comprised in the Deed of Concession in conformity with Article 1, on condition that, over and above the 16 per cent mentioned in Article 10, the concessionnaire shall pay every year the fixed sum of 2,000 (two thousand) tomans to the Imperial Government.

Article 5. The course of the pipe-lines shall be fixed by the concessionnaire and his engineers.

Article 6. Notwithstanding what is above set forth, the privilege granted by these presents shall not extend to the provinces of Azerbadjan, Ghilan, Mazendaran, Asdrabad, and Khorassan, but on the express condition that the Persian Imperial Government shall not grant to any other person the right of constructing a pipe-line to the southern rivers or to the South coast of Persia.

Article 7. All lands granted by these presents to the concessionnaire or that may be acquired by him in the manner provided for in Articles 3 and 4 of these presents, as also all products exported, shall be free of all imposts and taxes during the term of the present concession. All material and apparatuses necessary for the exploration, working and development of the deposits, and for the construction and development of the pipe- lines, shall enter Persia free of all taxes and Custom-House duties.

Article 8. The concessionnaire shall immediately send out to Persia and at his own cost one or several experts with a view to their exploring the region in which there exist, as he believes, the said products, and in the event of the report of the expert being in the opinion of the concessionnaire of a satisfactory nature, the latter shall immediately send to Persia and at his own cost all the technical staff necessary, with the working plant and machinery required for boring and sinking wells and ascertaining the value of the property.

Article 9. The Imperial Persian Government authorises the concessionnaire to found one or several companies for the working of the concession.

The names, "statutes" and capital of the said companies shall be fixed by the concessionnaire, and the directors shall be chosen by him on the express condition that, on the formation of each company, the concessionnaire shall give official notice of such information to the Imperial Government, through the medium of the Imperial Commissioner, and shall forward the "statutes", with information as to the places at which such company is to operate. Such company or companies shall enjoy all the rights and privileges granted to the concessionnaire, but they must assume all his engagements and responsibilities.

Article 10. It shall be stipulated in the contract between the concessionnaire, of the one part, and the company, of the other part, that the latter is, within the term of one month as from the date of the formation of the first exploitation company, to pay the Imperial Persian Government the sum of 20,000 sterling in cash, and an additional sum of 20,000 sterling in paid-up shares of the first company founded by virtue of the foregoing article. It shall also pay the said Government annually a sum equal to 16 per cent of the annual net profits of any company or companies that may be formed in accordance with the said article.

Article 11. The said Government shall be free to appoint an Imperial Commissioner, who shall be consulted by the concessionnaire and the directors of the companies to be formed. He shall supply all and any useful information at his disposal, and he shall inform them of the best course to be adopted in the interest of the undertaking. He shall establish, by agreement with the concessionnaire, such supervision as he may deem expedient to safeguard the interests of the Imperial Government.

The aforesaid powers of the Imperial Commissioner shall be set forth in the "statutes" of the companies created.

The concessionnaire shall pay the Commissioner thus appointed an annual sum of 1,000 sterling for his services as from the date of the formation of the first company.

Article 12. The workmen employed in the service of the company shall be subject to His Imperial Majesty the Shah, except the technical staff, such as the managers, engineers, borers and foremen.

Article 13. At any place in which it may be proved that the inhabitants of the country now obtain petroleum for their own use, the company must supply them gratuitously with the quantity of petroleum that they themselves got previously. Such quantity shall be fixed according to their own declarations, subject to the supervision of the local authority.

Article 14. The Imperial Government binds itself to take all and any necessary measures to secure the safety and the carrying out of the object of this concession of the plant and of the apparatuses, of which mention is made, for the purposes of the undertaking of the company, and to protect the representatives, agents and servants of the company. The Imperial Government having thus fulfilled its engagements, the concessionnaire and the companies created by him shall not have power, under any pretext whatever, to claim damages from the Persian Government.

Article 15. On the expiration of the term of the present concession, all materials, buildings and apparatuses then used by the company for the exploitation of its industry shall become the property of the said Government, and the company shall have no right to any indemnity in this connection.

Article 16. If within the term of two years as from the present date the concessionnaire shall not have established the first said companies authorised by Article 9 of the present agreement, the present concession shall become null and void.

Article 17. In the event of there arising between the parties to the present concession any dispute of difference in respect of its interpretation or the rights or responsibilities of one or the other of the parties therefrom resulting, such dispute or difference shall be submitted to two arbitrators at Tehran, one of whom shall be named by each of the parties, and to an umpire who shall be appointed by the arbitrators before the proceed to arbitrate. The decision of the arbitrators or, in the event of the latter disagreeing, that of the umpire shall be final.

Article 18. This Act of Concession, made in duplicate, is written in the French language and translated into Persian with the same meaning.

But, in the event of there being any dispute in relation to such meaning, the French text shall alone prevail.

== Early business ==
Once D'Arcy was granted the oil concession, his first order of business was to assemble a team to carry out the exploration for oil. The assembled team would carry out the daily operations in Persia for D'Arcy, as he would never set foot on Persian soil. D'Arcy hired Alfred T. Marriot to secure the concession and Dr. M. Y. Young to be the company's medical officer in Persia. George Bernard Reynolds was hired for the exploration because of his previous drilling experience in Sumatra. The first area chosen to explore for oil was Chiah Surkh, which is located near what is today's Iran–Iraq border.

The task for D'Arcy and his team would prove to be very difficult. This first site at Chiah Surkh had hostile terrain, warring tribes that often refused to recognize the Shah's authority and any concessions he granted, very few roads for transportation, and was nearly three hundred miles away from the Persian Gulf. The local population near the site also had a hostile culture towards Western ideas, technology, and presence. Local religion also played a factor as the dominating Shia sect in this region also resisted political authority and had a hostile attitude towards the outside world, including Christians and Sunni Muslims. Not only was the region and terrain hostile, but shipping each piece of equipment to the drilling sites was also extremely difficult. The equipment often had to be carried by man and mule through mountainous terrain.

== Drilling for oil ==
The actual drilling did not begin until the end of 1902. The working conditions were rough, as temperatures reached as high as 120 degrees Fahrenheit, equipment often broke down, there were shortages of food and water, and there was an abundance of insects that often bothered the workers. In 1903, D'Arcy began to worry as very little oil had been found and he began to run out of money. Expenses continued to mount as he had already spent £160,000 and needed at least another £120,000. It became evident that D'Arcy would either need more funding through loans or he would need to be bought out.

=== Search for funding ===
After being advised by Thomas Boverton Redwood, who was very knowledgeable on international oil developments, D'Arcy tried applying for a loan from the British Admiralty. At this time, before oil was considered a critical resource, the loan was ultimately denied. Shortly after D'Arcy's loan was denied, one of the wells at Chiah Surkh, in early 1904, became a producer. The output of oil was small, as the well only produced about 200 gallons per day. With or without this well being turned into a producer, D'Arcy still needed money to continue his venture. D'Arcy became busy looking around for investors and he even began to search in France for foreign investors, without much success. To make matters worse, shortly after they struck oil, the well at Chiah Surkh began to run out and turn into a trickle.

=== The British Admiralty intervenes ===
Back in London, the British Admiralty began to reconsider and feared that if they did not intervene, then D'Arcy would sell out his concession to other foreign investors or lose the concession altogether. They feared that the French or the Russians would take over the concession and then have a major influence in Persia. The British Admiralty decided to intervene and try to play matchmaker and find an investor to help out D'Arcy and keep the concession under British control. One way they did this was using a British spy named Sidney Reilly who allegedly disguised himself as a priest, and convinced D'Arcy to sell the majority of his concession to a "good 'Christian' enterprise. They were successful and with the help of Redwood they were able to strike a deal with the firm called Burmah Oil. D'Arcy and Burmah Oil made the deal in London in 1905 that made an agreement establishing the Concession Syndicate, renamed as the Anglo Persian Oil Co.

=== New drilling site ===
With new capital being provided by the agreement with Burmah Oil, exploration was able to continue. The focus for drilling now shifted towards southwestern Persia. The drilling site was closed at Chiah Surkh and the equipment was shipped to the southwest of Persia. The new drilling site was established at Masjed Soleyman. Once again, Reynolds encountered problems in this region with hostile tribes and the local population. Reynolds often had to pay them a high fee and guarantee them a share of profits in order to protect the concession. Disease also slowed down production and even Reynolds became very ill from contaminated drinking water.

In 1907, without any major findings of oil, D'Arcy once again became anxious. He decided to sell off the majority of his shares to Burmah Oil for £203,067 cash and £900,000 in shares. This meant Burmah acquired the majority of D'Arcy's interests in the exploitation company.

=== Major discovery ===
After mounting expenditure, continuous funding from Burmah Oil and very few results, Burmah also began to grow impatient. It was now 1908 and no commercial quantities of oil had been found and it began to seem as if the beginning of the end was near. Burmah Oil sent a letter to Reynolds telling him to slow down production and pack up the equipment because the project was nearly over. Just as the letter was making its way to Reynolds, at 4:00 am on 26 May 1908, people at the site woke up to shouting, as a 50-foot (15-metre) gusher of petroleum shot up the drilling rig. At last, commercial quantities of oil had been struck at the Masjed Soleyman site.

== Creation of Anglo-Persian ==
In 1909, shortly after the commercial quantities of oil were found, Burmah Oil thought that a new corporate structure needed to be created in order to work the concession. This led to the creation of the Anglo-Persian Oil Company and Burmah Oil made it a publicly traded company, by selling shares off to the public in 1909. At this time Burmah Oil maintained control and the majority of the ordinary shares. William Knox D'Arcy was compensated for his exploration costs and became a director of the new company.

== Cancellation and nationalization ==
On 27 November 1932, the D’Arcy Oil Concession was cancelled, and renegotiated in 1933, by Reza Shah. However the reasons for the cancellation and renegotiation are debated among historians. In 1951, the D’Arcy Concession was cancelled for good, and Iranian oil was nationalized.

According to J. H. Bamberg, in his book The History of the British Petroleum Company, Volume 2: The Anglo-Iranian Years, Reza Shah's cancellation of the D’Arcy concession in 1932 and the negotiation of a new concession in 1933 resulted from the global economic depression of the 1930s that brought a decline in D’Arcy oil demand, profits, and royalty payments to Iran. But, according to Stephanie Cronin in the book Middle Eastern Studies Vol. 31, No. 1, published in 1995 by Taylor & Francis Ltd, Bamberg's excuse that “economic fluctuations… resulted in concessionary instability” was a way of diverting responsibility and attention away from the Anglo-Persian Oil Company business practices, British fiscal policy, and the broader Iranian attitude towards the company, and pin the blame on something the company had no control over; and it most certainly doesn't explain the nationalization crisis of 1951 that saw Iranian oil nationalized, because profits peaked in 1950, and dividends had remained constantly high from 1946 up to the point of nationalization in 1951.

One business practice by the Anglo-Iranian Oil Company that led to the cancellation and renegotiation of the D’Arcy Oil Concession between 1932 and 1933 was the Iranian representation in the Anglo-Persian Oil Company; a problem that only affected senior and higher employees. Reza Shah demanded that more Iranians be placed in senior positions. Before the renegotiation, “almost all the company’s workmen were Iranian, while there were almost as many Indian foremen as Iranian foremen, and only a small number of senior staff positions were held by Iranians.

The Anglo-Persian Oil Company’s business practice that had by far the most influence on the 1932–33 cancellation and renegotiation was the way the company calculated its profits on which the royalty payments to Iran were based on. The D’Arcy Oil Concession stated that the Anglo-Iranian Oil Company was supposed to pay Iran an annual royalty equal to 16 percent of the company’s net profits. The problem was that the Anglo-Persian Oil Company did not include the profits of the subsidiary companies owned by the Company, profits Iran believed it was entitled to because the capital invested in these subsidiaries were all derived from the sale of Iranian oil; the company invested “millions of pounds in expanding its operation inside and outside Iran, in constructing refineries throughout the world, in building up a huge marketing organization and tanker fleet, and in developing new sources of supply that would eventually compete with Iran.

Other ways the Anglo-Persian Oil Company undercut Iranian royalties were selling oil to the British Admiralty at much lower rates, producing no consolidated accounts of the Company’s profits, and only permitting the Iranian government to see the company information the shareholders had access to, which kept the Iranian government from knowing the Company’s true profits. Iran’s inability to gain full access to the Company’s books robbed the Iranian government of any possibility of either confirming or dispelling its suspicions concerning the methods by which profits and royalties were calculated,” which further inflamed relations between the two bodies.

The British fiscal policies that further deteriorated Iranian relations with the Anglo-Persian Oil Company had to do with British taxation of corporate profits, which saw the Company paying more to Britain in taxes than it was paying to Iran in royalties; in 1950 the Company paid over 36 million pounds to the British and only a little over 16 million pounds to Iran in royalties and taxes combined.

In the end, though, the reasons for the 1951 nationalization of Iranian oil were not just financial. Since after World War I, and through the 1920s and early 1930s, Iranians questioned the legality of the Concession, arguing that the Concession had been granted under a government that was no longer in power, and before there were representative institutions in Iran. This argument of legality resurfaced again in the late 1940s, but were based on the fact that the 1933 renegotiated concession was granted in an unconstitutional manner. The unconstitutional manner in which the renegotiated concession was made came out in 1947, when Hassan Taqizadeh, an Iranian politician, was defending himself against charges of treason for signing the 1933 concession and revealed that the renegotiated concession was signed under duress and that the Shah was the one who had taken the ultimate decision.

== The concession in Iraq ==
In 1913, Persia gave some territory near Khanaqin to the Ottoman Empire. These Transferred Territories were land covered by the d'Arcy concession. The Ottoman Empire affirmed the oil rights with the 1913 border treaty. In 1923, oil was found at Naft Khana and the Anglo-Persian Oil Company began developing the field. On 24 May 1926, the Iraqi government affirmed the concession in the Transferred Territories and extended it in a modified form for 35 more years to 27 May 1996. In 1951, it was renegotiated and after a grace period the concession ended in 1958 with the assets at Naft Khana becoming property of the government of Iraq.

== Relevant literature ==
- Brew, Gregory (January 2017). "In Search of 'Equitability': Sir John Cadman, Rezā Shah and the Cancellation of the D'Arcy Concession, 1928‒33". Iranian Studies 50, no. 1: 125–148. JSTOR 26157179.
