= Holy Grail tapestries =

Series of tapestries depicting the legend of the Holy Grail

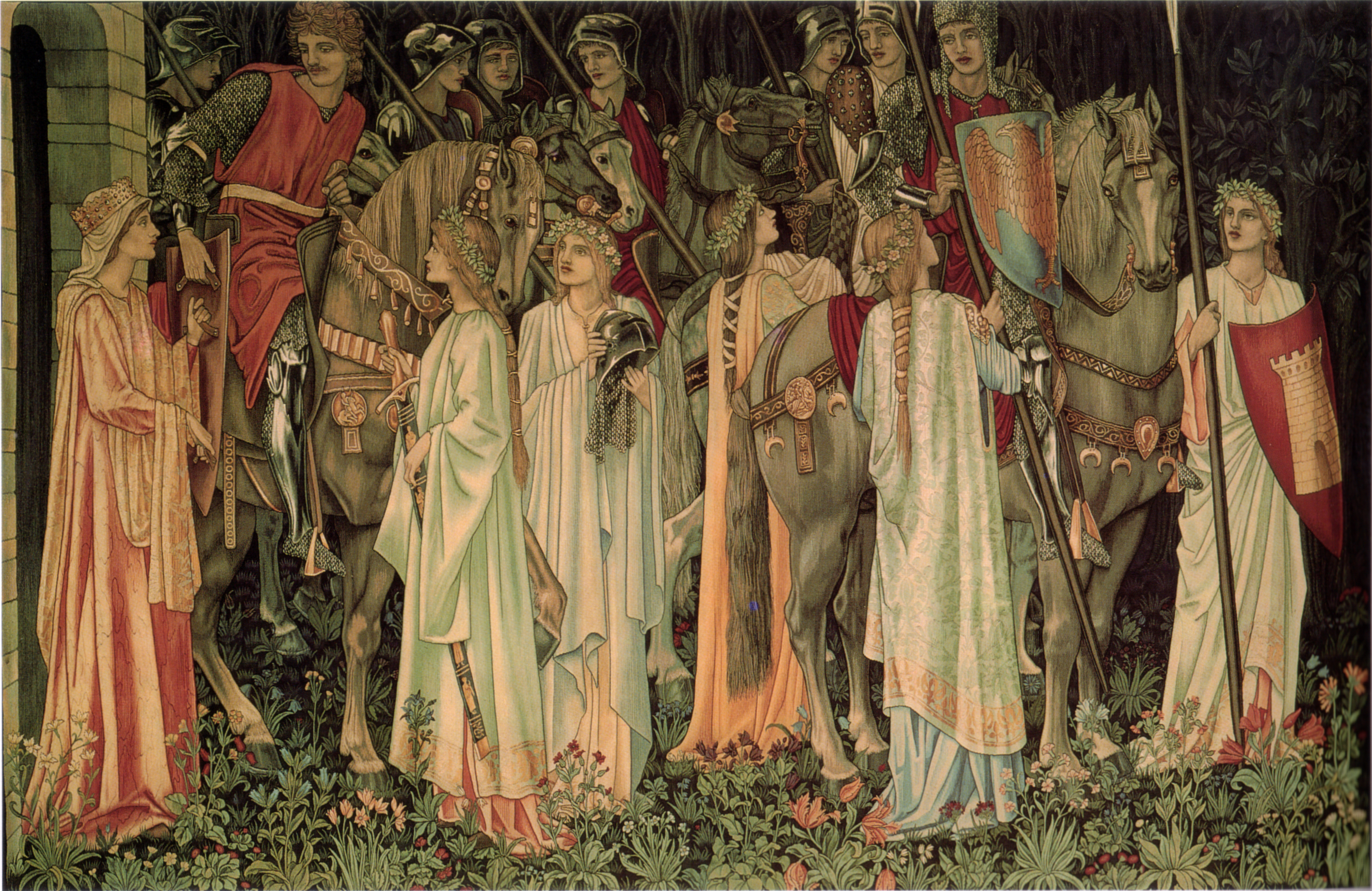
The Arming and Departure of the Knights, one of the Holy Grail tapestries.

The Holy Grail or San Graal tapestries are a set of six tapestries depicting scenes from the legend of King Arthur and the quest for the Holy Grail. The tapestries were commissioned from Morris & Co. by William Knox D'Arcy in 1890 for his dining room at Stanmore Hall, outside London. Additional versions of the tapestries with minor variations were woven on commission by Morris & Co. over the next decade.

== The series ==
The six original tapestries illustrate the story of the Grail quest as told in Sir Thomas Malory's 1485 book Le Morte d'Arthur. Like other Morris & Co. tapestries, the Holy Grail sequence was a group effort, with overall composition and figures designed by Edward Burne-Jones, heraldry by William Morris, and foreground florals and backgrounds by John Henry Dearle. The narrative panels were accompanied by smaller verdure or woodland panels featuring deer, the knights' shields hung on trees, and text telling the story of the panel hung above. The sequence was worked over a period of five years, from 1891 to 1894, at Merton Abbey. The Attainment was the first of the series to be completed, and was shown at the Arts and Crafts Exhibition in 1893.

The six tapestries are:

- The Knights of the Round Table Summoned to the Quest by the Strange Damsel
- The Arming and Departure of the Knights
- The Failure of Sir Gawaine: Sir Gawaine and Sir Uwaine at the Ruined Chapel
- The Failure of Sir Launcelot to enter the Chapel of the Holy Grail
- The Ship
- The Attainment: The Vision of the Holy Grail to Sir Galahad, Sir Bors, and Sir Perceval (also known as The Achievement of the Grail or The Achievement of Sir Galahad, accompanied by Sir Bors, and Sir Perceval)

Textile historian Linda Parry wrote of the series "their design, decoration and weaving establish them, beyond doubt, as the most significant tapestry series woven in the nineteenth century."

The original set of tapestries remained at Stanmore Hall until D'Arcy's death in 1920. They were subsequently sold and dispersed. Morris & Co. wove a second subset of the narrative panels in 1895 and 1896 for the drawing room at Compton Hall, Lawrence Hodson's seat near Wolverhampton. A third complete set was woven for George McCulloch in 1898 and 1899. Some hangings from these subsequent weavings are in the Birmingham Museum and Art Gallery. Others are in the collection of Andrew Lloyd Webber. The Stanmore Hall weaving of The Attainment was purchased by guitarist Jimmy Page in 1978; the piece failed to meet its reserve at auction in 2008 and remains in Page's collection.

== Gallery ==
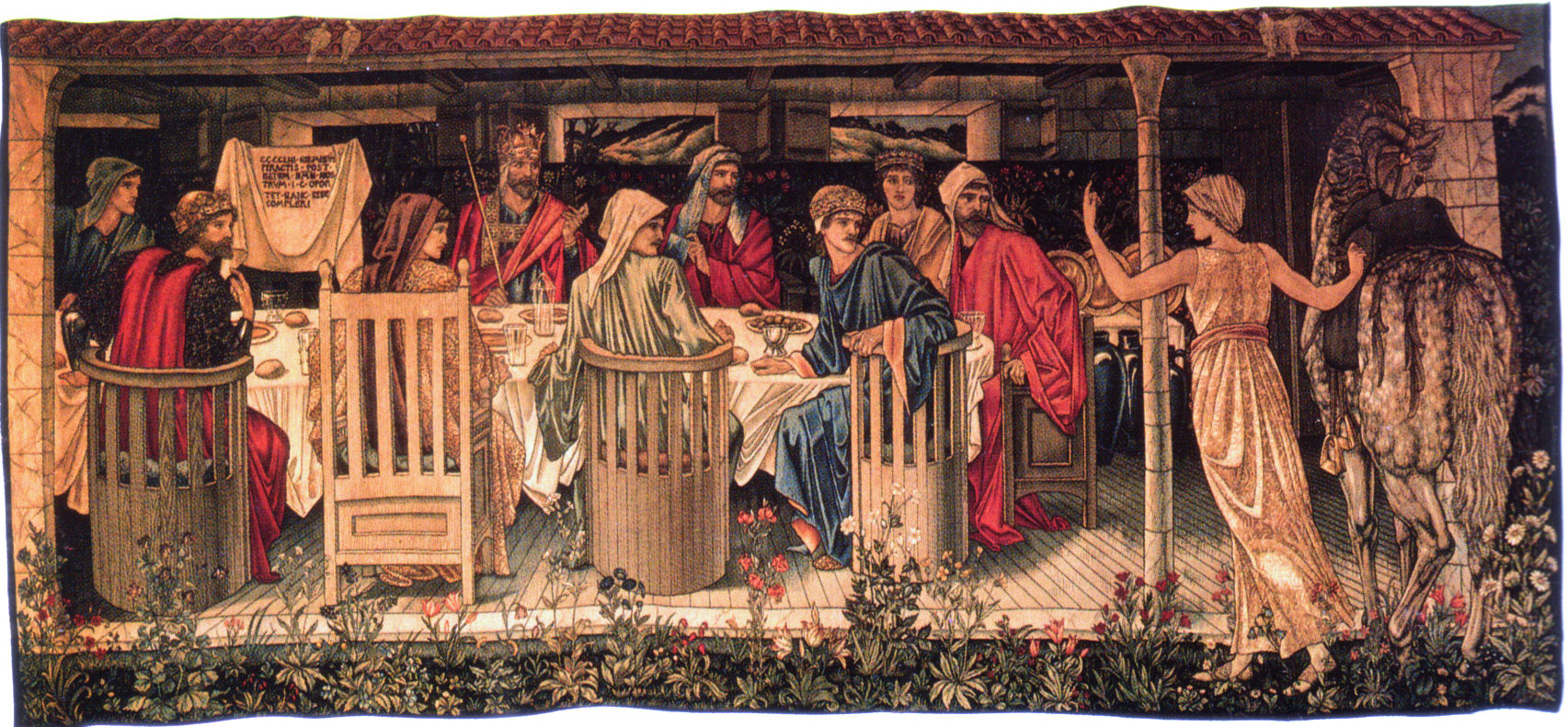
The Summons

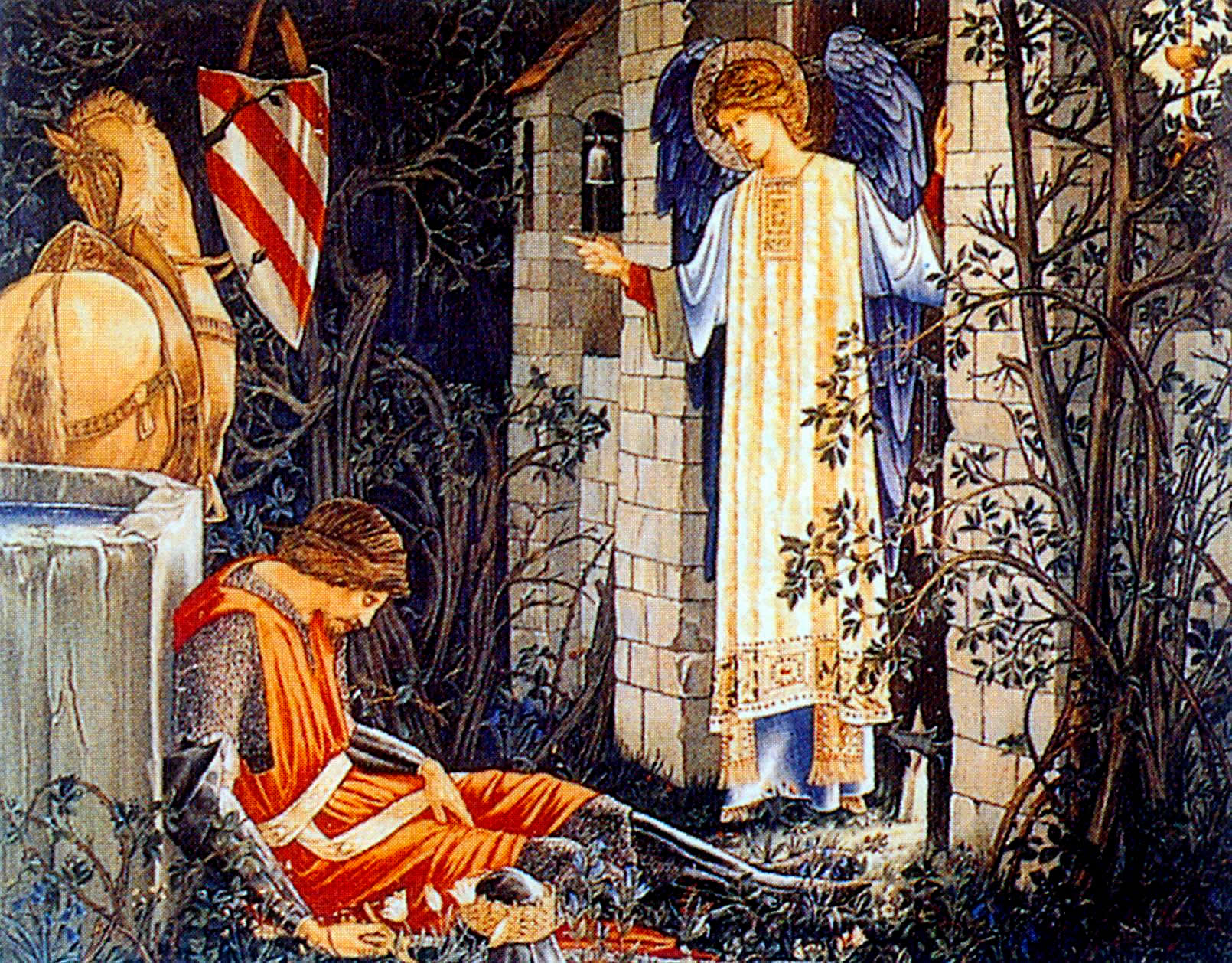
The Failure of Sir Launcelot

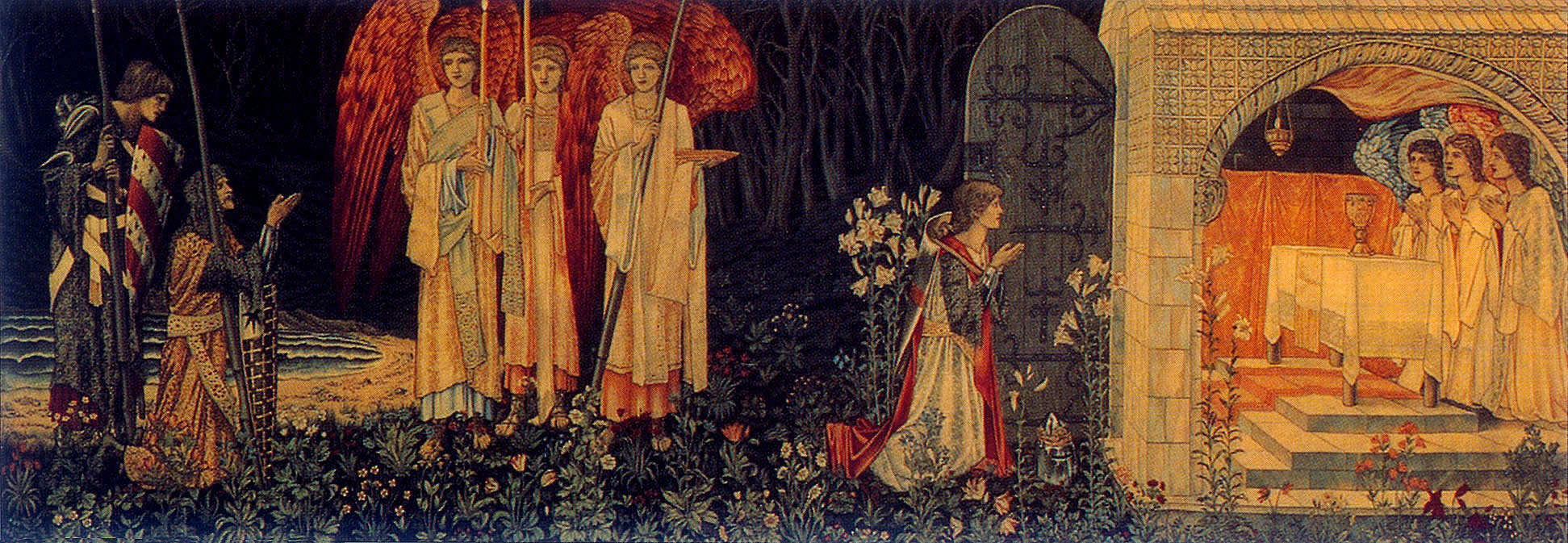
The Attainment or The Achievement of the Grail, version woven 1895-96, now in the Birmingham Museum & Art Gallery

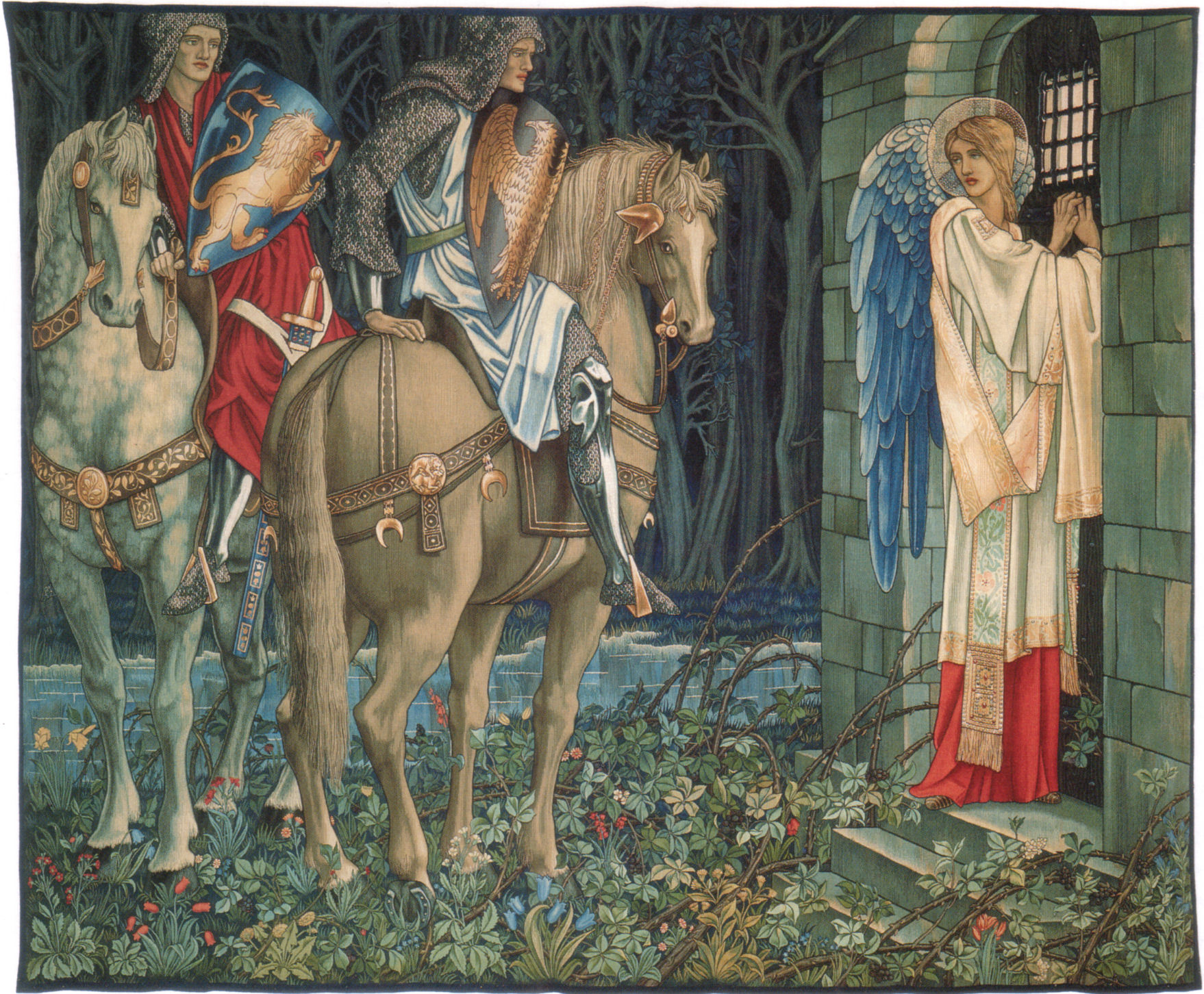
The Failure of Sir Gawaine

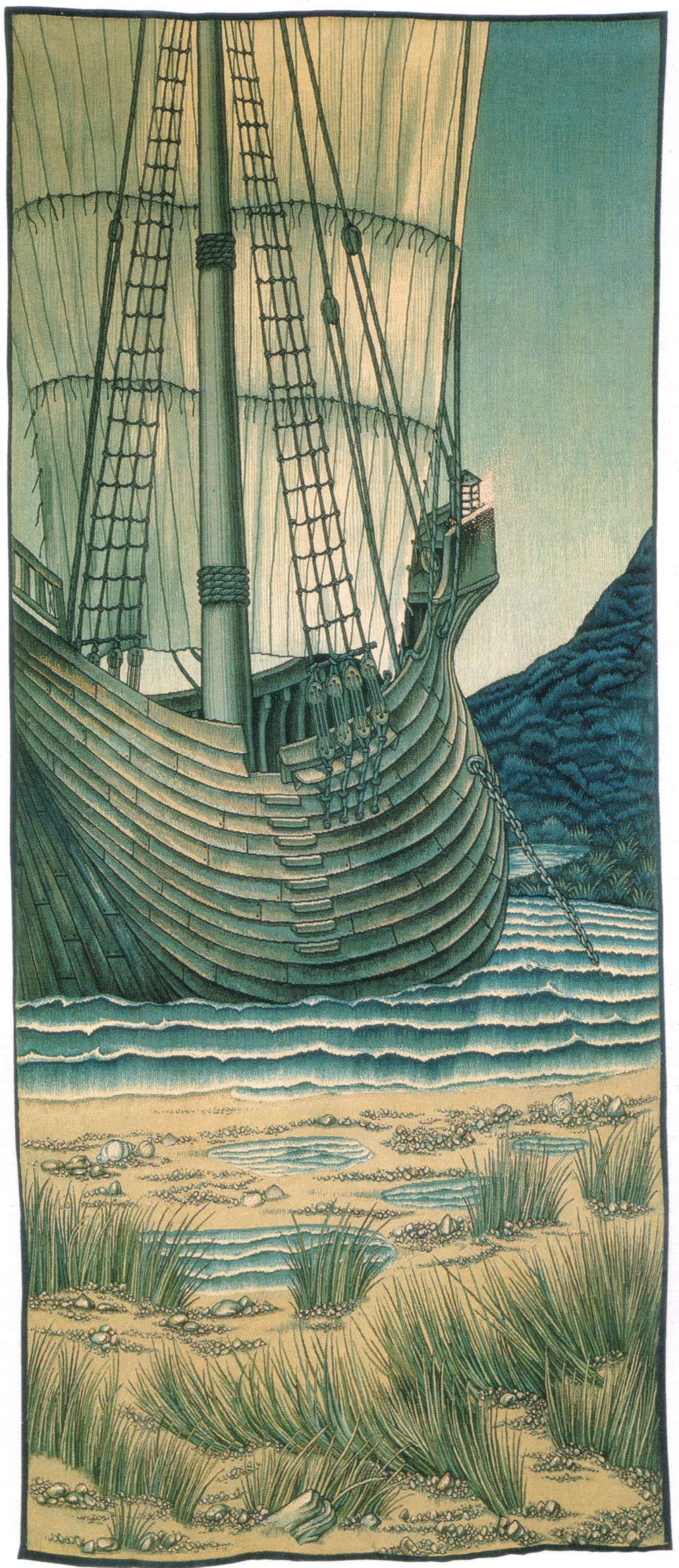
The Ship

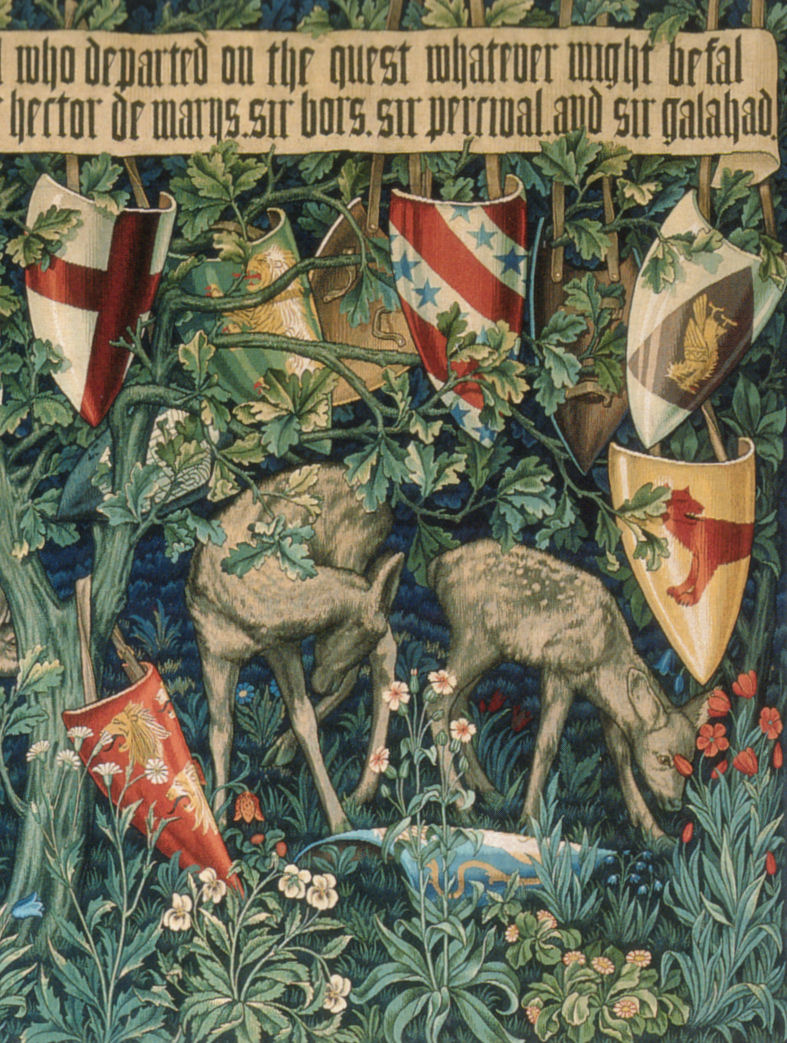
Detail of verdure panel with deer and shields

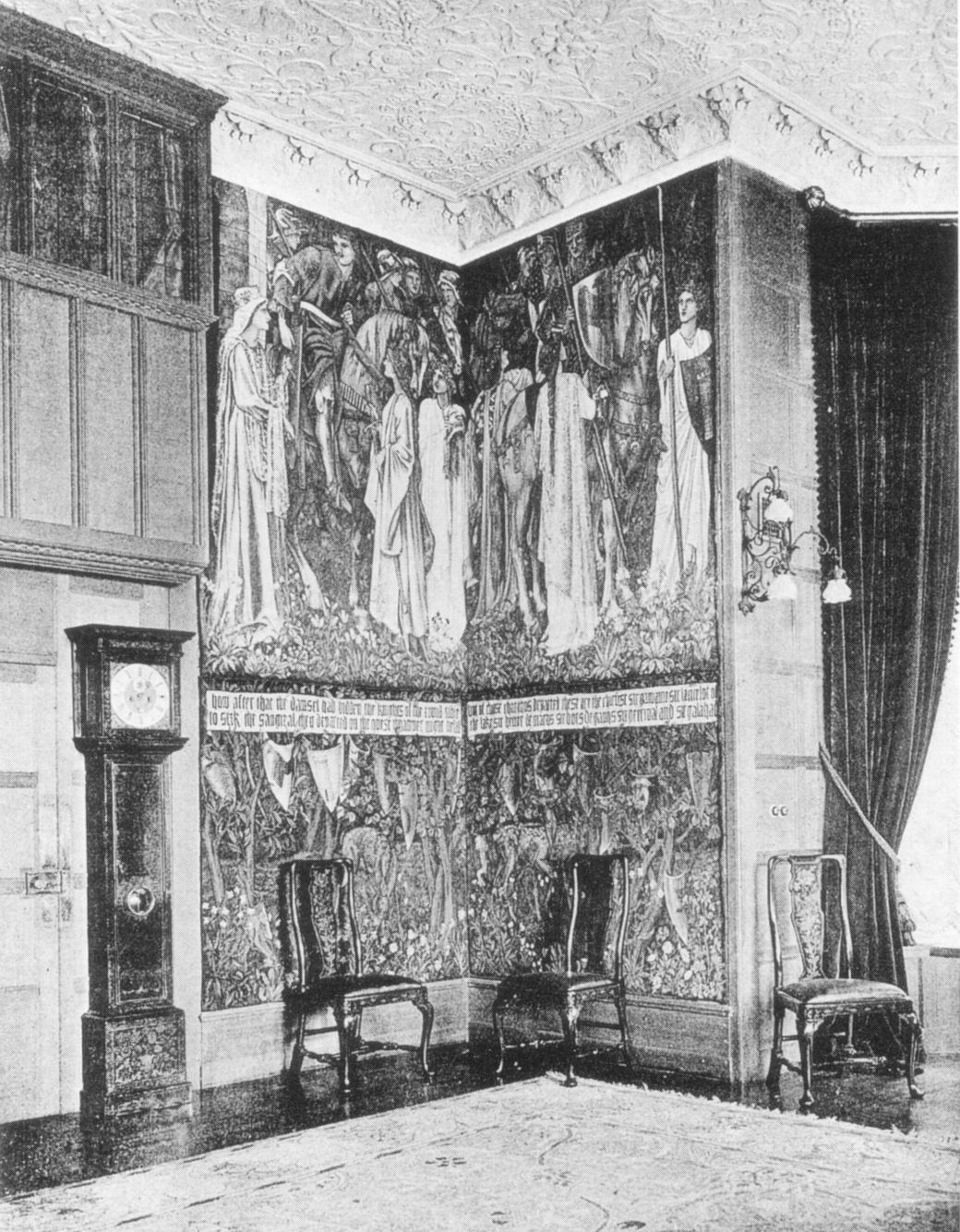
The Arming of the Knights and its verdure panel in the dining room at Stanmore Hall, 1898

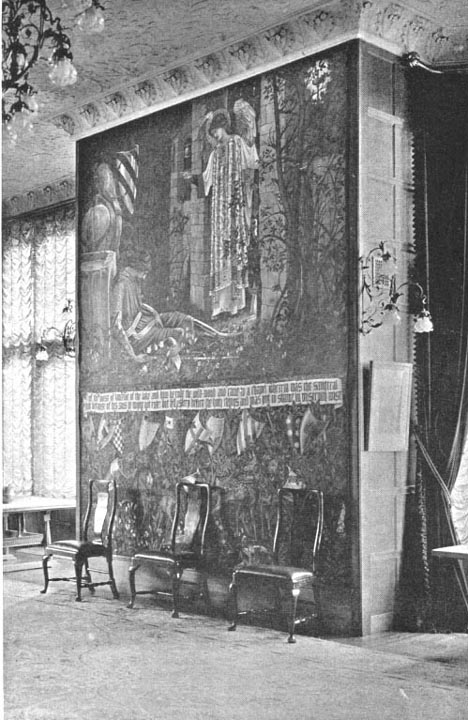
The Failure of Sir Launcelot and verdure panel, Stanmore Hall, 1898

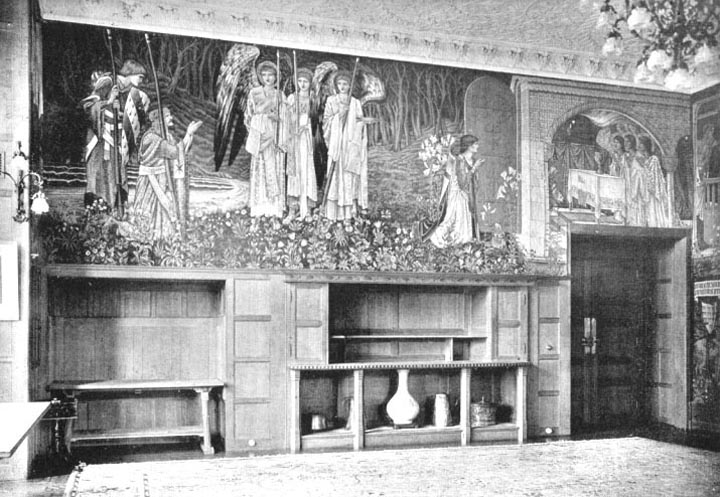
The Attainment, Stanmore Hall, 1898. The original weaving of this panel was shaped to fit over the doorway.
