= Museum of the Scottish Shale Oil Industry =

Museum in West Lothian, Scotland

Coordinates: 55°53′08″N 3°32′54″W

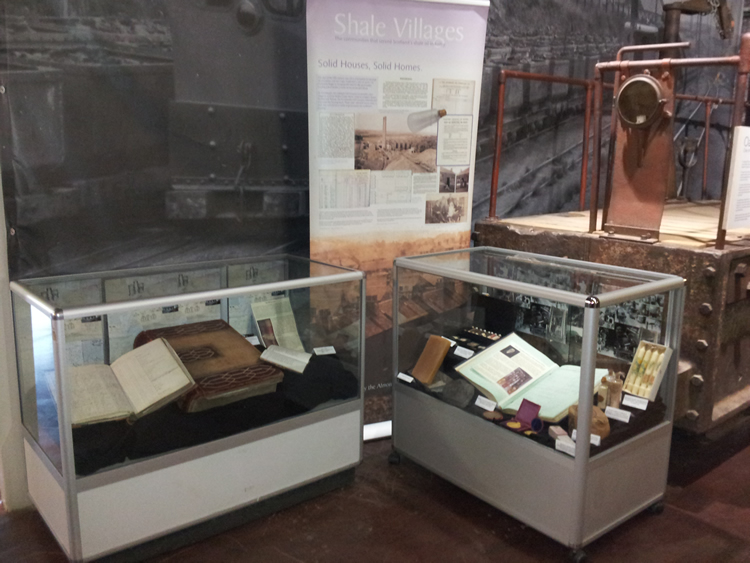
Temporary display within the Museum of the Scottish Shale Oil Industry

The Museum of the Scottish Shale Oil Industry was created in 1990, to preserve the history of the shale industry in West Lothian and beyond. It is sited on a former mill at Millfield, near Livingston, Scotland. It is attached to Almond Valley, a heritage centre, large farm and play area.

== Buildings ==
The Museum is housed in the reception area of Almond Valley Heritage Centre.

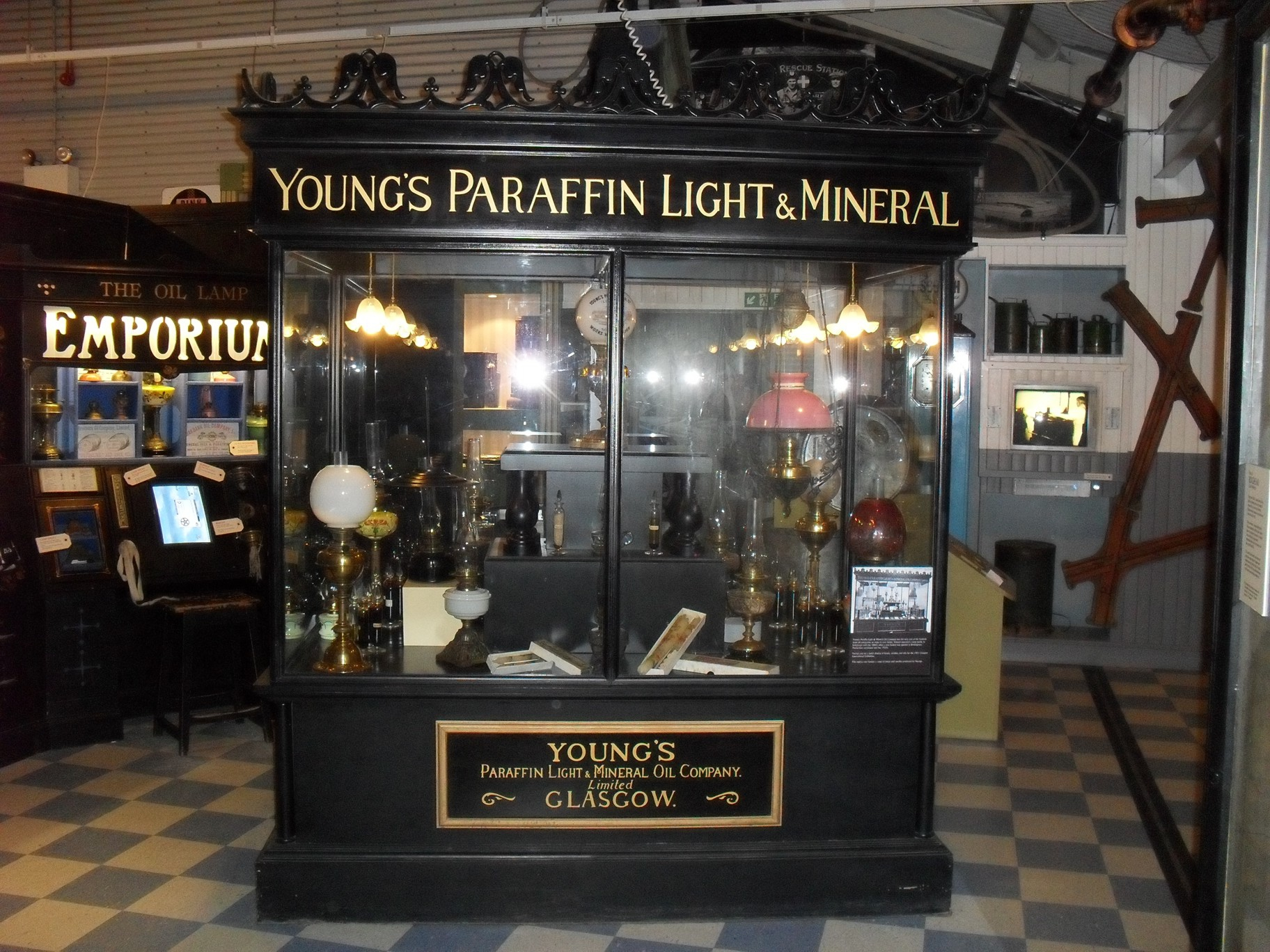
Replica of an exhibition case used by Young's Paraffin Light & Oil Co. Ltd

== Collections ==
The Museum has three primary collections. The Scottish Shale Oil Collection dates from the opening of the museum in 1990 and includes a vast array of objects, photographs and maps related to the shale industry. The Reference Collection sits in tandem with the Museum Collection, but includes mainly copied photographs and documents that have unknown provenance. The BP Archive was presented to the Museum in 2013 by the University of Warwick in an effort to make it publicly accessible. It is primarily made up of documents and a number of photographs relating mainly to the six shale oil companies which were still in existence in the 1910s, and the company that took them over. The Museum is currently undertaking a mass digitisation project with the aim being to have 95% of the collection available to view online. Much of this work is undertaken by volunteers.

== Exhibitions ==
The Museum has in place a permanent exhibition detailing the industrial history of the shale industry, and the social history surrounding it. There is also a temporary exhibition that stays in place for several months at a time. In the past this has focused on subjects such as Quoiting, the Burngrange Disaster and Pit Ponies. The current (April 2018) temporary exhibition was put together by museum volunteers, and highlights objects from the collection that have some meaning to them.

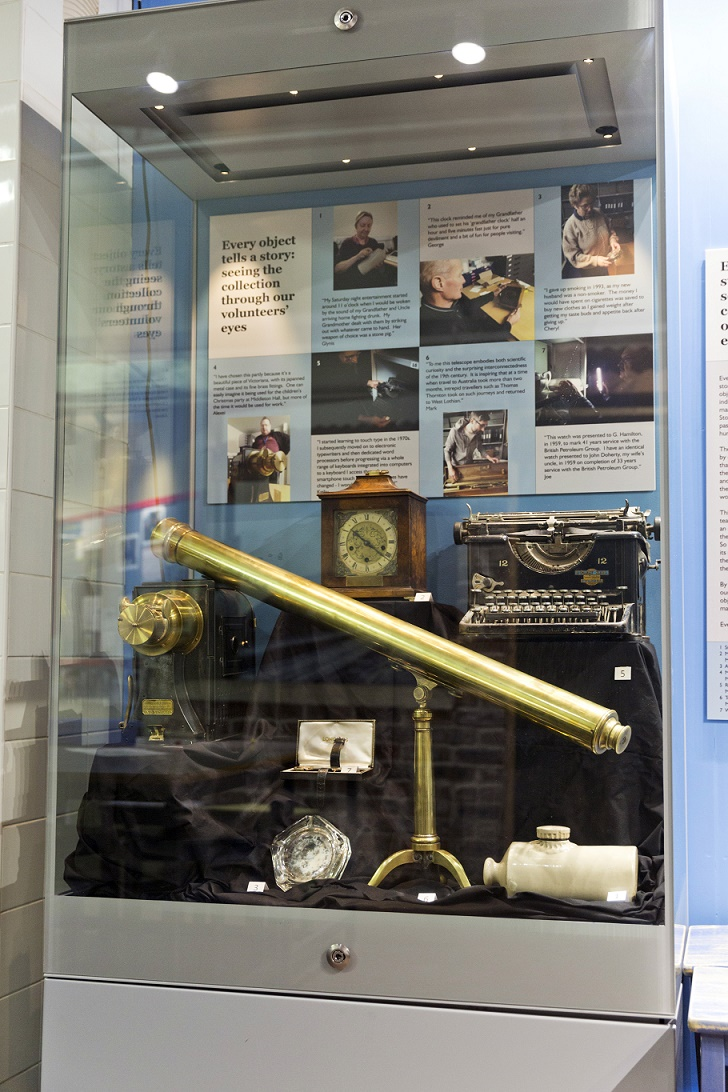
Volunteer-led exhibition at the Museum of the Scottish Shale Oil Industry

== Recognition ==
The Museum Collection is a Nationally Significant Collection. The Museum is Accredited.
