= Abadan Refinery =

Oil refinery in Abadan, Iran

Coordinates: 30°20′45.57″N 48°16′29.3″E

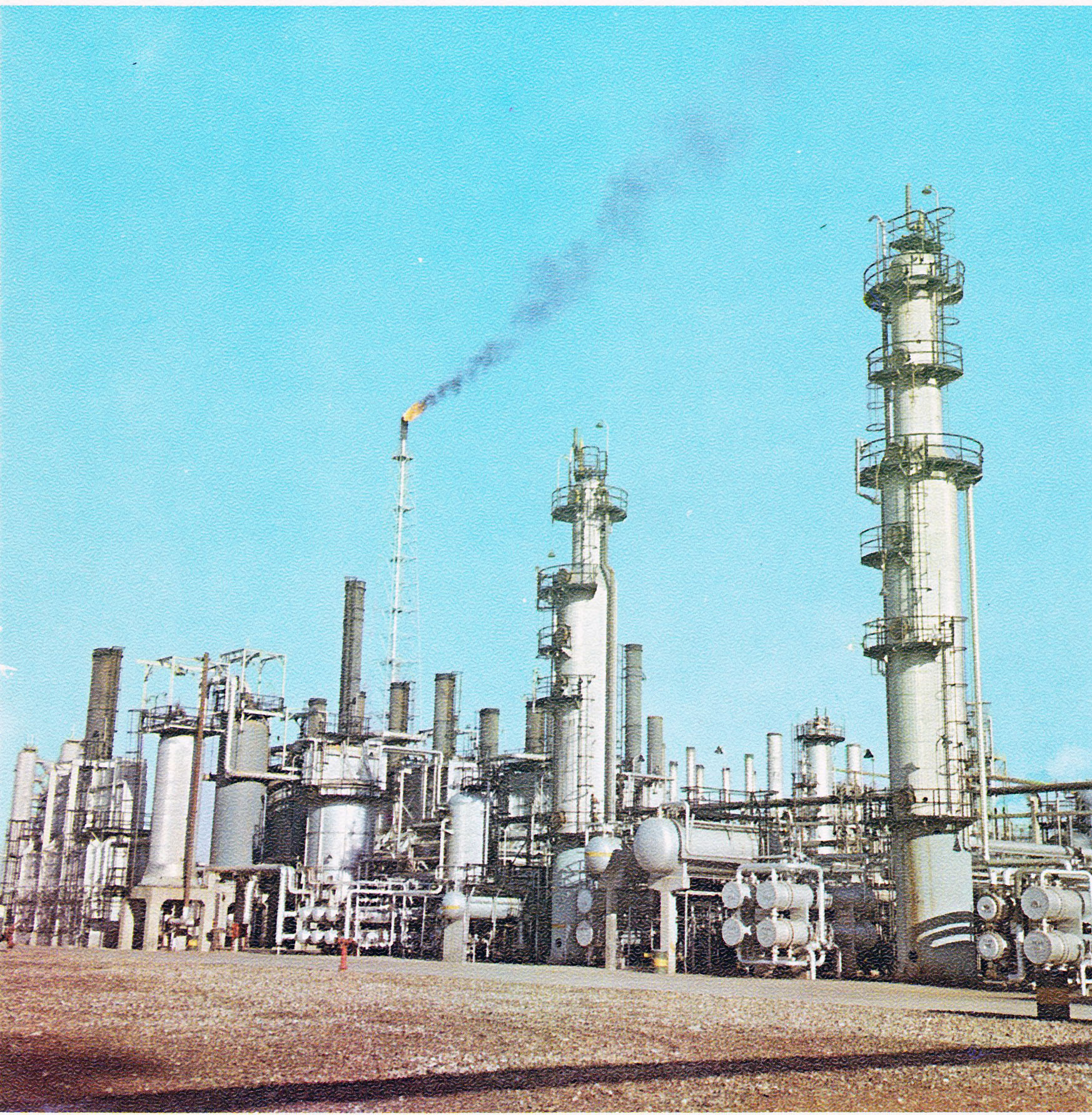
- Abadan Refinery, 1970
- Interactive map of Abadan Refinery
- Location: Abadan, Iran

Refinery details
- Opened: 1912
- Capacity: 520,000 barrels per day (83,000 m^{3}/d)

The Abadan refinery (Persian: پالایشگاه آبادان Pālāyeshgāh-e Ābādān) is an oil refinery in Abadan, Iran near the coast of the Persian Gulf.

== History ==
Built by the Anglo-Persian Oil Company (later BP) on the basis of a lease obtained in 1909, it was completed in 1912 as a pipeline terminus, and was one of the world's largest oil refineries. In 1927, oil exports from Abadan totalled nearly 4.5 million tons. Its nationalisation in 1951 prompted the Abadan Crisis and ultimately the toppling of the democratically elected prime minister Mossaddegh. In December 2017, Sinopec signed a US$1 billion deal to expand the Abadan refinery. Work on the second phase of the project was suspended in March 2020 due to the COVID-19 pandemic in Iran.

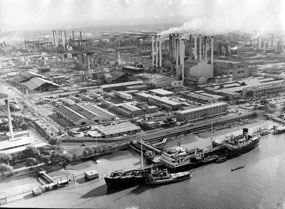
The Abadan Refinery in 1950

According to the refinery's managing director, its crude capacity rose from about 370,000 barrels per day in 2021 to about 500,000 in 2024. In 2025 a deputy chief executive of the National Iranian Oil Refining and Distribution Company said Abadan accounted for the largest share of the growth in Iran's national capacity, which reached 2.4 million barrels per day. The refinery's chief executive said in 2025 that it supplied about 17 percent of the country's gasoline, 22 percent of its diesel and 42 percent of its mazut.

The 2026 Iran war began on 28 February with US and Israeli strikes on Iran. In the early hours of 2 March, a strike on the refinery started large fires visible from Basra in Iraq, although the report did not name the attacker. Further strikes on or near the refinery were reported in March, but the extent of the damage was not independently established, and the refinery was reported to be producing again by September. On 13 July, Iranian media reported that a US projectile hit Abadan and wounded at least one person.

== See also ==
- Horace Walter Rigden
- List of oil refineries
- National Iranian Oil Refining and Distribution Company
- Petroleum
- Siege of Abadan
