= San Remo Oil Agreement =

1920 agreement between the United Kingdom and France

The San Remo Oil Agreement was an agreement between Great Britain and France signed at the San Remo conference on 24 April 1920. As a result of the agreement, the French Compagnie Française de Petroles (CFP) (Note: Initially held by the French government and transferred on creation of CFP in 1924) acquired the 25% share held by Deutsche Bank in the Turkish Petroleum Company (TPC). The other shareholders were (same as in 1914): the Anglo-Persian Oil Company (APOC), in which the British government held a controlling interest, with 47.5%, the Anglo-Saxon Petroleum (wholly owned subsidiary of Shell), with 22.5% and the remaining 5% belonged to Calouste Gulbenkian. This however is inferred from context and the eventual success enjoyed by the TPC in subsequent negotiations. The text of the agreement says nothing about Germany (early drafts did mention it), but grants to France the right to buy a 25% share in any future concession that may be obtained in Mesopotamia by either the British government or a private company. It also says nothing about the composition of the remaining 75% of that entity, except that 20% should be made available out of both the French and British shares for acquisition by Iraqi nationals, a stipulation that was eventually not honored in the dealings with the Iraq government.

The Turkish Petroleum Company was still a paper-only company in 1920. The composition of the TPC changed again in 1928. Only in 1925 did TPC get a concession for development from Iraq. In 1927 the company found oil in Iraq and was renamed the Iraq Petroleum Company in 1929. In 1934 production from the Kirkuk field started to reach world markets. The Iraq Petroleum Company and its affiliates then dominated the important Iraq petroleum industry for almost four decades, until the company was nationalized in 1972.

== Background ==
On 19 March 1914, the British and German governments had signed an agreement whereby the interest of National Bank of Turkey in TPC was transferred to APOC. The newly reconstituted TPC then applied for a concession for Mesopotamian oil which was granted subject to various conditions at which point World War I intervened. In December 1918, the British expropriated the 25% share of Deutsche Bank in TPC.

It was this latter share that was ultimately to be given to the French under the San Remo oil agreement. There were prior abortive attempts at an agreement, preliminary and then final version of the Long-Bérenger Agreement, then the Greenwood-Bérenger Agreement before the final San Remo version. All versions can be seen at.

The agreement delimited the oil interests in Russia and Romania, British (British Mandate of Mesopotamia) and French colonies. The initial agreement takes the names of the British petroleum minister, Sir Walter Long, and the French petroleum minister, Henri Bérenger, who negotiated the agreement.

== Full text ==
Long-Berenger Agreement (Memorandum of Agreement between Henry Berenger and Walter H. Long, Paris, April 8, 1919): (Note: The book contains a summary of chapter 4 starting on page LXXVI)

Greenwood-Berenger Agreement (Memorandum of Agreement between Hamar Greenwood and Henry Berenger, December 21, 1919):

San Remo Oil Agreement (Memorandum of Agreement between M. Philippe Berthelot and Sir John Cadman, San Remo, April 24, 1920):

== See also ==
- Partitioning of the Ottoman Empire
