= Partex =

Portuguese oil company

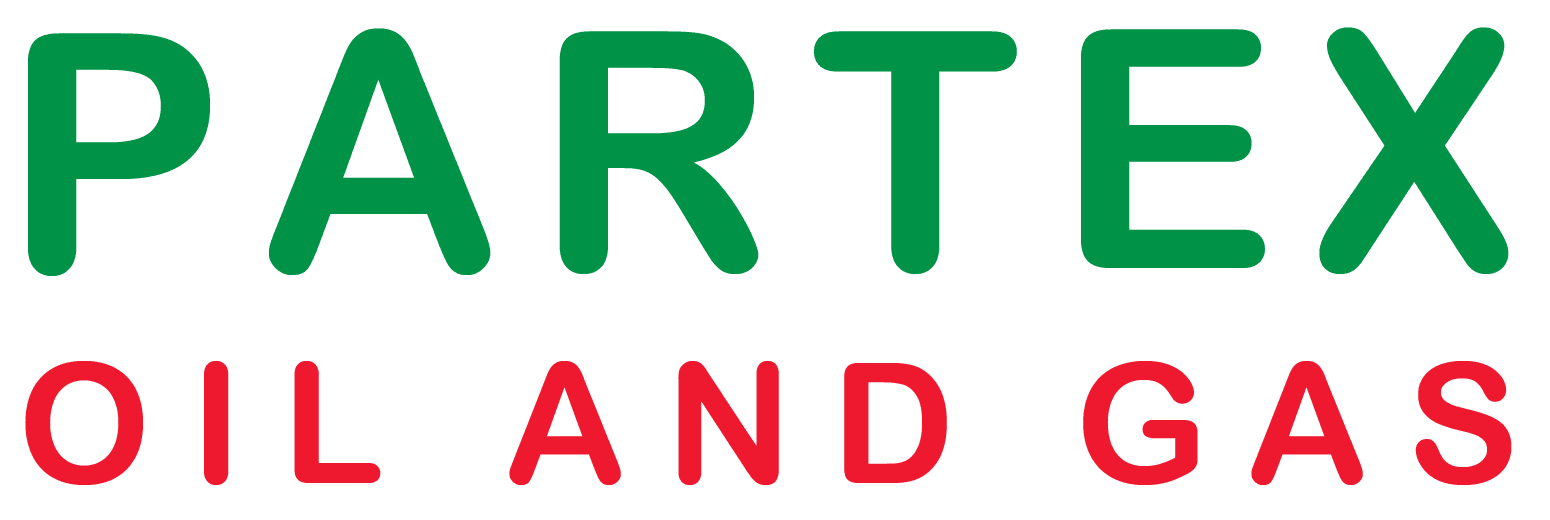
Logo of the company

Partex Oil and Gas (Holdings) Corporation is an oil company owned by PTT Exploration and Production, a company based in Thailand. It was previously owned by the Calouste Gulbenkian Foundation, from Lisbon, Portugal, until it was sold in June 2019.

== History ==
Prior to World War I, Calouste Gulbenkian was the entrepreneur behind the formation of the Turkish Petroleum Company which, after many vicissitudes, became the Iraq Petroleum Company in which he held a 5% interest (becoming known as Mr. Five Percent as a result). The contract between Shell, Anglo Persian (now BP), Compagnie Française des Pétroles (now Total), Near East Development Company (ExxonMobil) and Calouste Gulbenkian was signed in July 1928. At the same time the partners undertook to work together within the boundaries of the former Ottoman Empire - the Red Line Agreement. This agreement had a fundamental influence on the future development of the oil reserves in the Middle East and led directly to the Partex Oil and Gas Group's present interests in the United Arab Emirates and the Sultanate of Oman.

In 1938, before the beginning of World War II, Calouste Gulbenkian incorporated in Panama a company to hold his assets in the oil industry. It was Participations and Explorations Corporation from which came the name Partex.

Calouste Gulbenkian spent the final years of his life in Lisbon, Portugal, where he died in 1955. In his will, he left his oil interests and his art collection to a foundation, which was to be based in Lisbon, Portugal: the Calouste Gulbenkian Foundation.

The Iraq concession was nationalized in 1972, but it's still active in Abu Dhabi and Oman through its joint ventures/concession companies which includes ADPC, ADCO, and POHOL (Private Oil Holdings Oman Ltd.). It also holds concessions in other countries like Kazakhstan, Algeria and Brazil and explores in the Peniche basin in Portugal.

In June 2019, the Calouste Gulbenkian Foundation signed an agreement to sell Partex to PTT Exploration and Production, a Thai state-owned enterprise for $622 million (about €555 million).

== Organization ==
The Partex Oil and Gas Group is basically organized by geographical areas and holds interests in concessions and joint ventures engaged in upstream activities related to the oil and gas industry, namely exploration, development, production and sales. The Group is headed by a holding company incorporated in Cayman Island with sub-holding companies, management units, concession companies and service companies that provide to the joint ventures and operating companies in which the Group participates all the necessary advice and financial, technical, management and human resources support that they require, in accordance with the strategy and guidelines defined by the Holding.

== Resources ==
Partex Oil and Gas has access to oil and gas assets based on the percentage ownership of resources estimated to be produced throughout the remaining life of the concessions in which the Group participates. The oil and gas resources of the Group at the end of 2005 reached 215 million barrels of oil equivalent, showing a clear increase in relation to 2004.

== See also ==
- PTT Exploration and Production
