= Kirkuk Field =

Oil field in Iraq

Kirkuk
- Country: Iraq
- Region: Iraq
- Location: Baba Gurgur
- Offshore/onshore: Onshore

Field history
- Discovery: 1927
- Start of production: 1934

Production
- Recoverable oil: 10,000 million barrels (~1.4×10^{9} t)

Kirkuk Field is an oilfield in Kirkuk, Iraq. It was discovered by the Turkish Petroleum Company at Baba Gurgur in 1927. The oilfield was brought into production by the Iraq Petroleum Company (IPC) in 1934 when the 12-inch pipelines from Kirkuk (British-ruled Mandatory Iraq) to Haifa (Mandatory Palestine) and Tripoli (French-ruled Greater Lebanon) were completed. It has ever since remained the most important part of northern Iraqi oil production with over 10 billion barrels (1.6 billion cubic metres) of proven remaining oil reserves in 1998. After about seven decades of operation, Kirkuk still produces up to 1 million barrels per day (160,000 cubic metres per day), almost half of all Iraqi oil exports. Oil from the Kirkuk oilfield is now exported through the Kirkuk–Ceyhan Oil Pipeline, which runs to the Turkish port of Ceyhan on the Mediterranean Sea.

Some analysts believe that poor reservoir-management practices during the Saddam Hussein years may have seriously, and even permanently, damaged Kirkuk's oilfield. One example showed an estimated 1.5 billion barrels (240 million cubic metres) of excess fuel oil being reinjected. Other problems include refinery residue and gas-stripped oil. Fuel oil reinjection has increased oil viscosity at Kirkuk making it more difficult and expensive to get the oil out of the ground.

On 11 July 2014 Kurdistan Regional Government forces seized control of the Kirkuk oilfield, together with the Bai Hassan field, prompting a condemnation from Baghdad and a threat of "dire consequences," if the oilfields were not returned to Iraq's control.

In the aftermath of the Kurdish Referendum, as part of 2017 Iraqi–Kurdish conflict, the control of the oil fields, along with almost all of Kirkuk Governorate, returned to the government of Iraq.

== See also ==
- Mosul–Haifa oil pipeline
