= Iraq Petroleum Company =

England-based oil company

- Native name: شركة نفط العراق
- Formerly: African and Eastern Concessions Ltd (1911); Turkish Petroleum Company (1912-1929)
- Type: Consortium
- Industry: Oil exploration and production
- Founded: January 31, 1911; 1928
- Founders: Anglo-Persian Oil Company; Royal Dutch Shell; Compagnie Française des Pétroles; Near East Development Corporation; Calouste Gulbenkian
- Fate: Nationalised in 1972^{a}
- Successor: Iraq National Oil Company
- Headquarters: London, United Kingdom
- Areas served: Iraq; Middle East^{b}; Europe^{c}
- Products: Mostly crude oil, some refined products
- Owners: BP; Royal Dutch Shell; ExxonMobil; TotalEnergies; Partex
- Footnotes: ^{a} Although nominally still extant on paper.; ^{b} Via associate companies.; ^{c} Received lion's share of the crude

The Iraq Petroleum Company (IPC), formerly known as the Turkish Petroleum Company (TPC), is an oil company that had a virtual monopoly on all oil exploration and production in Iraq between 1925 and 1961. It was jointly owned by some of the world's largest oil companies and headquartered in London, England.

In June 1972, the Ba'athist government in Iraq nationalized the IPC, and its operations were taken over by the Iraq National Oil Company. The company "Iraq Petroleum Company" still remains extant, although only in paper form. One associated company – the Abu Dhabi Petroleum Company (ADPC, formerly Petroleum Development (Trucial Coast) Ltd) – also continues with its original shareholding intact.

The related Iraq Petroleum Group was an association of companies that played a major role in the discovery and development of oil resources in areas of the Middle East outside Iraq.

== History ==
=== Turkish Petroleum Company ===
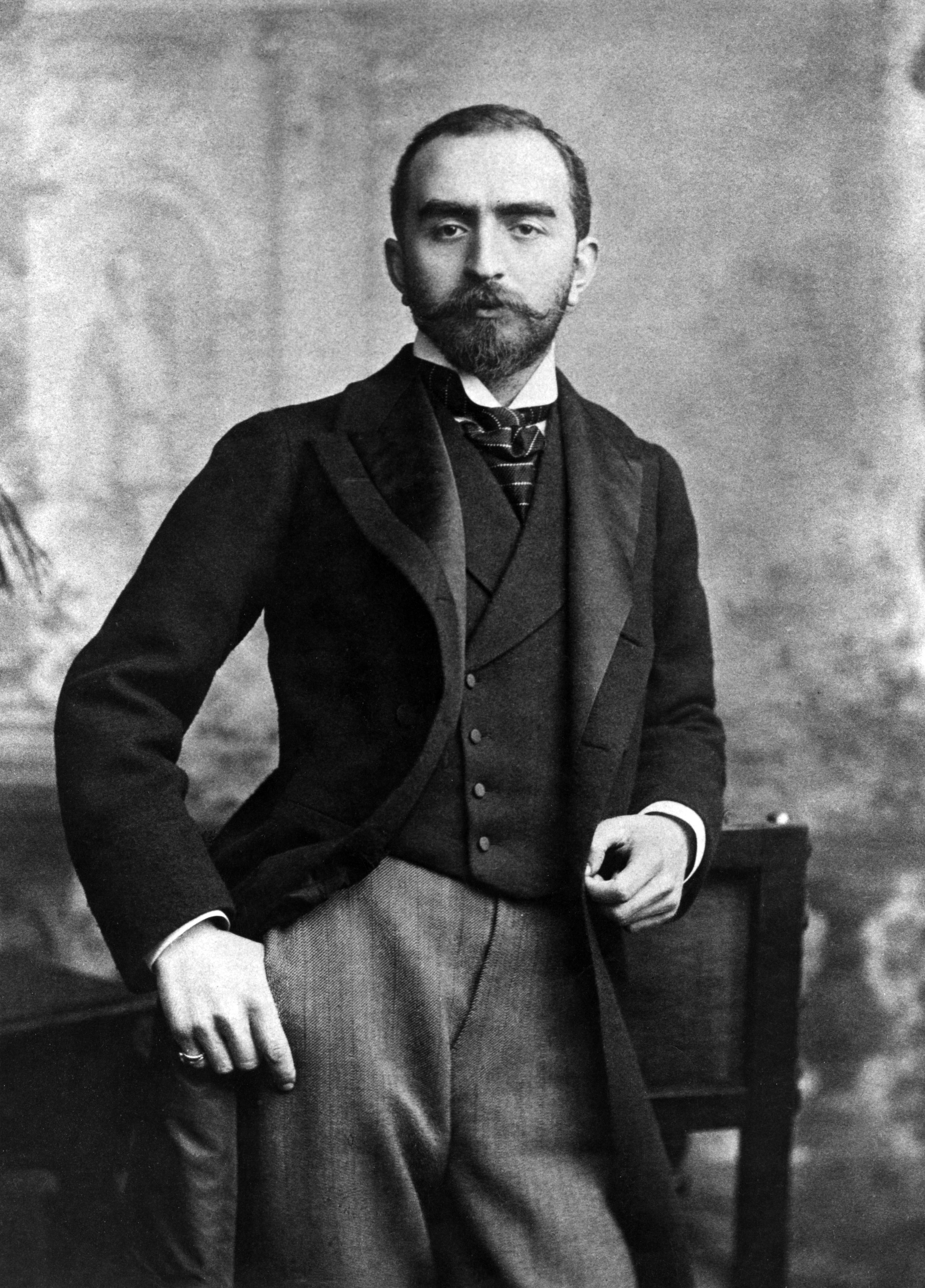
Calouste Gulbenkian, British-Armenian oil magnate

The forerunner of the Iraq Petroleum Company (IPC) was the Turkish Petroleum Company (TPC), which was established in the early 20th century in the belief that Mesopotamia (Iraq and parts of Syria) contained substantial reservoirs of oil. It was created by Calouste Gulbenkian, a British-Armenian oil magnate.

Since Mesopotamia was an Ottoman possession, early negotiations for an oil concession centered in the empire's capital, Constantinople. The first interest was shown by Imperial German banks and companies, already involved in building the Berlin-Baghdad railway. On January 31, 1911, in an attempt to bring together the competing British and German interests in the region, a British company known as African and Eastern Concessions Ltd, was formed in which Deutsche Bank held 25% in exchange for their railway concessions and Gulbenkian held 40%. Germans working on the Berlin-Baghdad Railway had struck some oil prior to World War I and the wells were afterwards operated by the British military in a very limited capacity.

On October 23, 1912, this company became the Turkish Petroleum Company (TPC). The owners were:

- Deutsche Bank: 25%
- National Bank of Turkey (British-owned): 50%
- Anglo-Saxon Petroleum Co. (Royal Dutch-Shell): 25%
- Gulbenkian: 15% (held by National Bank of Turkey)

The Royal Navy under First Lord of the Admiralty Winston Churchill was in the process of switching from coal (available in abundance in the United Kingdom) to fuel oil, but wanted to remain in control of the production of its fuel. It undertook to acquire a controlling interest in The Anglo-Persian Oil Company, which had been in possession of the D'Arcy Concession in Persia since 1909 and was the only producer of crude oil (Masjed Soleyman oil field) and refined products (Abadan Refinery) in the Middle East outside of Egypt (which had a fledgling, but small scale oil industry). (Note: Anglo-Egyptian Oilfields (incorporated July 6, 1911 - a subsidiary of Royal Dutch Shell and after the formation of African & Eastern Concessions Ltd) took over the Gemsah field (discovered in 1908) and struck oil in the Hurghada field in 1913 and built the Suez refinery in 191?. All of them were small in comparison with Iran's oil facilities) With the weight of the British government behind the enterprise, the TPC felt that it was necessary (or perhaps beneficial) to concede to the demands of these rival interests to become part of TPC. On March 19, 1914, at the British Foreign Office, an agreement was adopted, with Gulbenkian's share reduced to 5%, taken care of equally by Shell (22.5%) and APOC (47.5%), leaving 25% to Deutsche Bank. The capital was increased from 80,000 to 160,000 £1 ordinary shares, the new shares were purchased by APOC, while those of the National Bank of Turkey were distributed among the remaining two parties. The Board now had 8 members (APOC: 4, Deutsche: 2, Shell: 2). Gulbenkian's interest, from which he was entitled to reap all financial benefits, was nonvoting and his shares held in custody by APOC and Shell. In clause 10 of this agreement was formulated in short form the Red Line Agreement of 1928. The investment decision of the British government in APOC was ratified in the House of Commons on June 17, 1914, in a 254–18 vote, after a long debate in which the Turkish Petroleum Co. was apparently not even mentioned.

Deutsche Bank brought a concession granted to the Anatolian Railway Company to explore for minerals and oil along a 40 km (25 mi)-wide strip on either side of its proposed railway in Mesopotamia. On 28 June 1914, the Turkish grand vizier confirmed the promise of a concession to TPC, but the outbreak of World War I ended TPC's plans.

When the Ottoman Empire was broken up in the aftermath of the war, the question of shareholding in TPC became a major issue at the 1920 San Remo conference, where the future of all non-Turkish and Arab-majority areas of the former Ottoman Empire were mostly decided with the creation of the League of Nations mandates for Palestine, Syria and Mesopotamia. A rising demand for petroleum during the war had demonstrated to the big powers the importance of having their own sources of oil. Since one of the original partners of TPC had been German, the French demanded this share as the spoils of war. This was agreed upon by the San Remo Oil Agreement, much to the annoyance of the Americans, who felt excluded from Middle Eastern oil and demanded an open door. After prolonged diplomatic exchanges, U.S. oil companies were permitted to buy into the TPC, but it would take several years until the negotiations were completed.

During the 1920s the Naft Khana field was discovered and brought into commercial operation by the Anglo-Persian Oil Co. in lands covered by the 1901 d'Arcy concession, including some 20 miles of pipeline to a refinery at Khanaqin on the Iraq-Iran border northeast of Baghdad. Oil production from this first commercial field and first refinery in Iraq was just a fraction of what Kirkuk was going to produce.

=== The 1925 concession and the policy of the Open Door ===
By 1925 a consortium of six American oil companies were allowed entry into TPC: Mexican Petroleum, Gulf Refining, Atlantic Refining, Sinclair Consolidated Oil, Standard Oil of NJ, Standard Oil of NY. The American group, the French, Shell and APOC each held a 25% interest, but with an overriding 10% oil royalty payable by TPC to the British APOC. The concession signed in Baghdad on March 14, 1925 (full text:) covered the provinces of Mosul (35,130 square miles) and Baghdad (54,540), but excluded the Basra province (53,580) and ran for 75 years. Gulbenkian was left out, no agreement had been reached on his share and it was to be decided at a later date. The composition of TPC in 1925 was from the outset a preliminary one.

Under the terms of the concession TPC was to conduct a comprehensive survey beginning within 8 months of March 14, and make the findings available to any future interested party. Within 32 month, TPC had to choose 24 blocks of 8 square miles each for exclusive exploitation and begin drilling within 3 years. Another 12 months later and from thereon in intervals of 1 year, an auction was to be held in which 24 new blocks were to be awarded to any interested party, which would then enter into a sub-lease agreement with the TPC. The TPC would be the recipient of the sale proceeds of these auctions. All sub-leases were under a predefined set of conditions, including a 4 shilling ($0.96) royalty per ton payable to the Iraq government and subject to a future adjustment peg to world oil market prices; the obligation to drill (in each block) 1,500 feet in the first 3 years and 500 feet in subsequent years until a block had been fully tested. The same conditions applied to TPC on their blocks and their royalty obligations. Additionally, TPC was obliged to reserve 30% of pipeline capacity for sublessees and then on a day-by-day basis buy oil from producers in a competitive market to fill that shared capacity. In 1927 the deadline for TPC's selection of its 24 blocks was extended by one year to November 14, 1928, after ongoing border disputes had caused disruptions to the geological survey parties.

Secondary Iraqi interests that were safeguarded by other clauses included: the right to appoint one government official to serve on the TPC board of directors, the obligation to TPC to employ Iraqi citizens to the extent practically possible and to also train them towards becoming capable of employment. Whenever new shares were to be issued by TPC, Iraqi interests were to be given the first right to purchase them on 20% of the new stock. These terms specifically resulted in the strongest official criticism of a generally unpopular government decision. The ministers of Justice and Education resigned over the successful refusal of TPC to honor the clause of the San Remo Oil Agreement that granted local national interests a general right to acquire 20% participation in TPC, not limited to only new shares issued.

The American group got an open door and were invited to join TPC. They managed to influence TPC policy and created an open door for further participation. But this policy was weak. Since IPC received the auction proceeds and the procedure used sealed bids which IPC processed, IPC could shut out any competitor at zero upfront cost for the lease to itself. In any event, in the revision of the 1925 concession signed in 1931 IPC was granted a blanket concession for the territory east of the Tigris and no block auction ever took place.

=== Oil found in 1927 ===
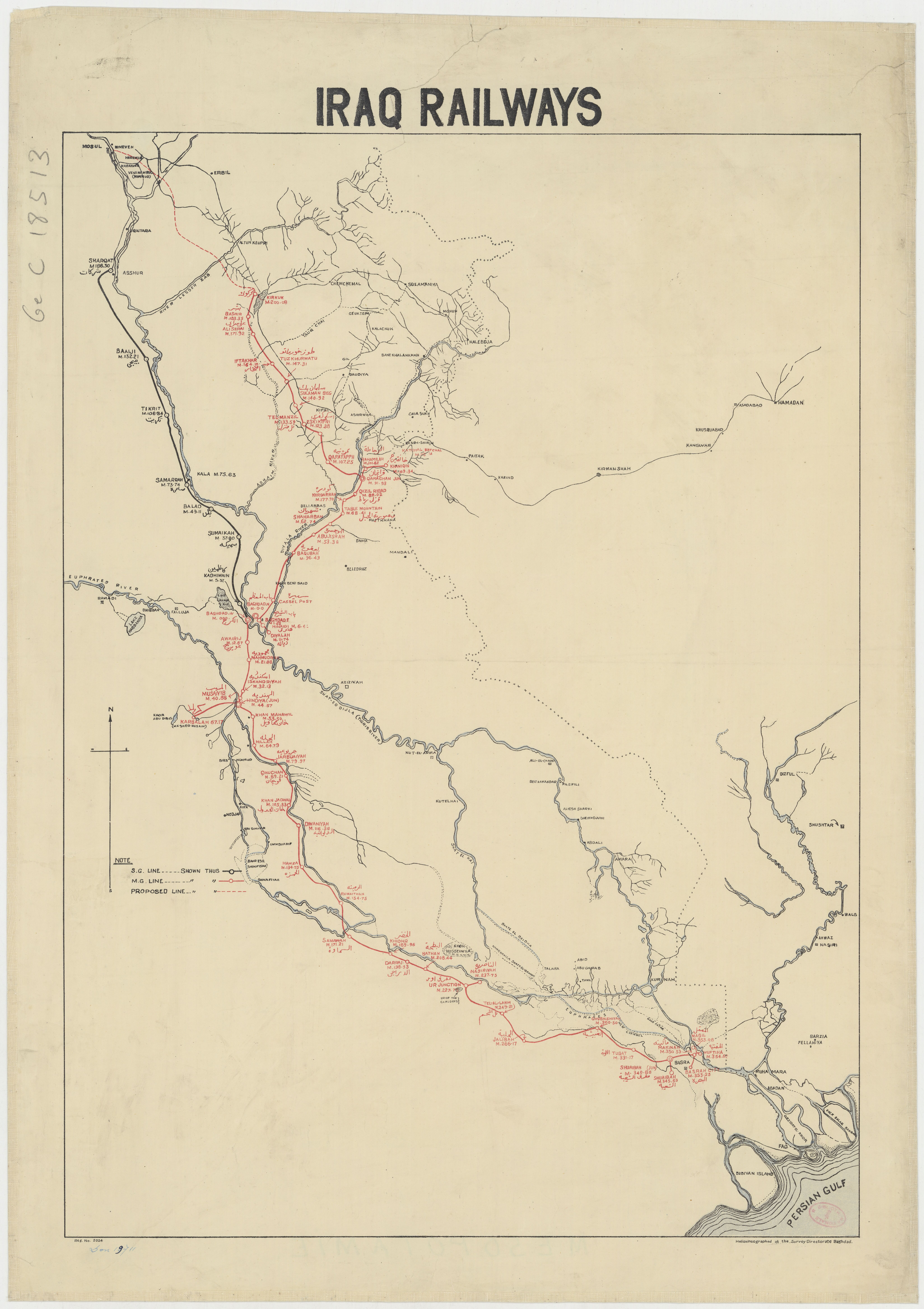
Contemporary Iraq RR network

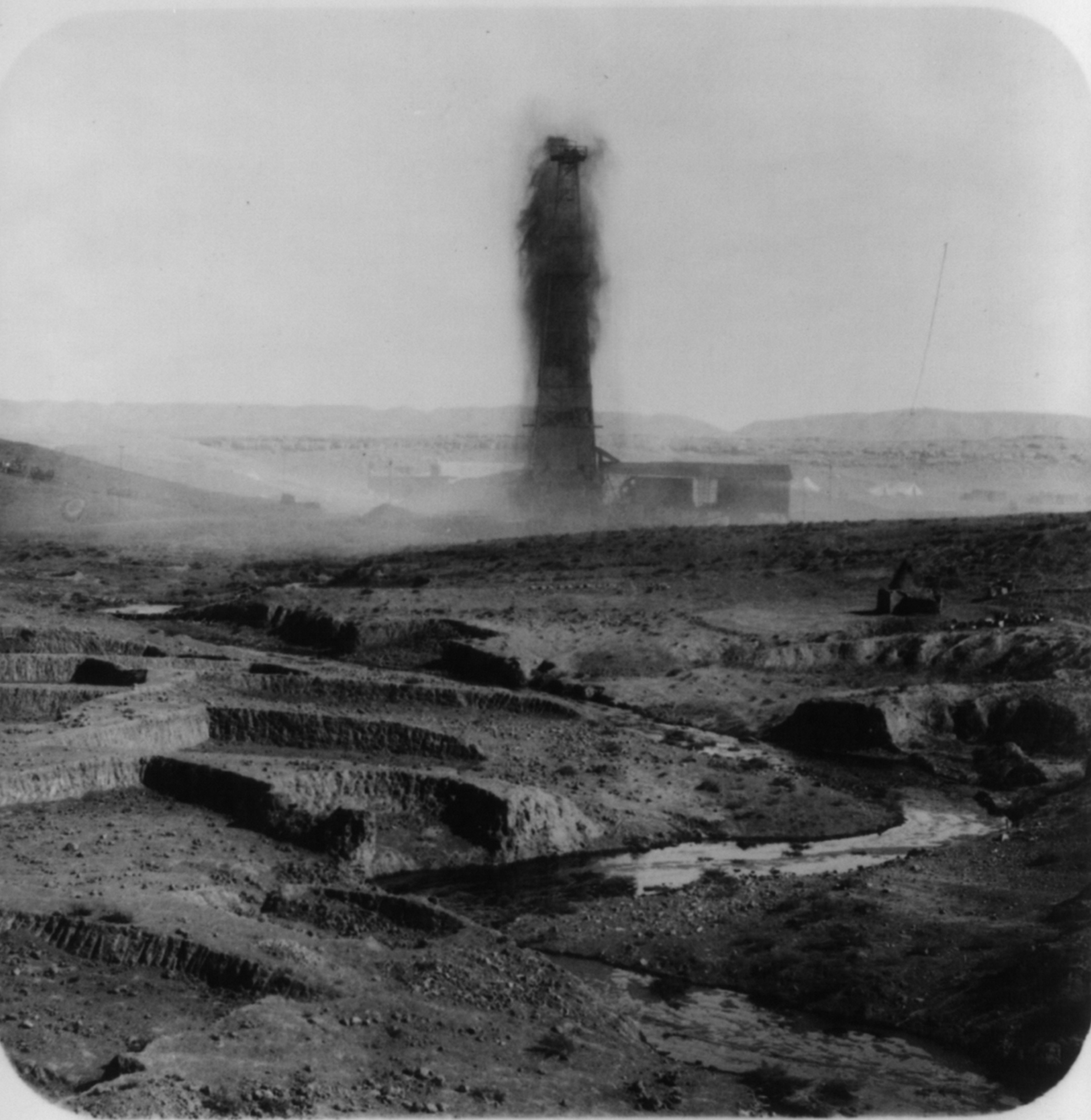
Kirkuk district: an oil gusher spouting with a stream of oil in foreground.

The first 30 geologists were on the ground in Iraq in September 1925.

In 1925 the IRR Eastern Line meter-gauge railway extension from Eskikifri was completed via Tuz Khurmatu to Kirkuk. The headquarters for the exploration effort were erected at Tuz Khurmatu. At Qarah Tappah and at Sulaiman Beg 1,000 ft railroad sidings were laid. From Qarah Tappah 26 miles of road were built to a new road junction from which 5 miles of road were built to the drill site at Khashm Al Ahmar and 9 miles to the Injanah site. From Qarah Tappah 36 miles of 3-inch fuel pipe were laid. At Umr Mandan a 270 ft timber bridge was built. From Umr Mandan, 14.25 miles of mixed 3 and 4-inch water pipe were laid to Khashm Al Ahmar. From the siding at Sulaiman Beg 5 miles of road were built to the Palkhanah drill site. Seven miles of mixed 3 and 4-inch water pipe led from Tuz Khurmatu to Palkhanah. At a conference held in London on September 2, 1926, 10 drilling locations were selected. The road and pipe construction was carried out in the second half of 1926, 50 British company men directed a workforce of 2,500 Iraqis. (further activities of infrastructure construction in 1927 are not covered by the above cited sources). Sharqat, on the banks of the Tigris, was at the time the northern terminus of an isolated standard-gauge stretch to Baghdad of the Berlin-Baghdad railway, but was not yet connected to the main portion ending at Nusaybin on the Turkish border, because World War I had put an end to the German-led effort.

TPC planned to drill 8 holes with rotary drills to a maximum depth of 4,500 feet widely spaced east of the Tigris and 2 holes with cable-tool rigs, near the Tigris, to a maximum depth of 1,500 feet. The drilling crews were from California.

Geologist J. M. Muir located the well at Baba Gurgur, just north of Kirkuk. Drilling commenced, and on October 14, 1927, oil was struck at a depth of 1,521 feet. The initial uncontrolled gushing spilled many tons of oil, but the oil field was soon brought under control and proved to be extensive.

1927 drilling locations
Area	Name of Well	Drilling started	Approx. Location
near Tuz Khurmatu	Palkhanah No. 1	April 5, 1927	34.82731°N 44.73127°E (Note: The CIA intel is wrong on this one. 5 miles by road from Sulayman Beg railway siding)
near Tuz Khurmatu	Palkhanah No. 2	April 1927	34.82731°N 44.73127°E
Jebel Hamrin (south)	Khashm Al Ahmar	April 1927	34°22′N 44°40′E
Jebel Hamrin (south)	Injanah	June 1927	34°28′N 44°38′E
near Kirkuk	Baba Gurgur	July 1927	35°32′N 44°20′E
near Kirkuk	Tarjil	August 1927	35°21′N 44°26′E
near Kirkuk	Kor Mor Ali Khan Beg		35°06′N 44°47′E
near Tauq, SE of Kirkuk	Jambur	September 14, 1927	35°06′N 44°33′E
north of Sharqat	Qaiyarah	July 1927	35°47′N 43°16′E
south of Sharqat	Jabal Khanuqah		35°22′N 43°17′E

TPC drilled a total of 14,646 feet in 1927 and 17,781 feet in 1928.

=== Red Line Agreement and the creation of IPC ===
The discovery hastened the negotiations over the composition of TPC, and on 31 July 1928 the shareholders signed a formal partnership agreement to include the Near East Development Corporation (NEDC).

The final composition of the Turkish Petroleum Company was thus:

- 23.75% Anglo-Persian Oil Company (APOC)
- 23.75% Royal Dutch/Shell
- 23.75% the Compagnie Française des Pétroles (CFP)
- 23.75% Near East Development Corporation (NEDC)
- 5% Calouste Gulbenkian.

TPC was to be organized as a nonprofit company, registered in Britain, that produced crude oil for a fee for its parent companies, based on their shares. The company itself was only allowed to refine and sell to Iraq's internal market, in order to prevent any competition with the parent companies. Gulbenkian, who did not own a refinery, signed a separate agreement with CFP on or around July 31, 1928 in which CFP took on the obligation to buy his share of oil at a fair price, i.e. reasonably close to the market value at the point of shipment. The obligation had no real downside to CFP who were eager to obtain sources of supply.

The Near East Development Corporation (Note: Incorporated in Delaware on February 3, 1928 with an authorized capital of 50,000 shares (par $100), of which 25,500 were issued) consisted of five large US oil companies:

- Standard Oil of New Jersey: 25% (41 2/3% after 1931, 50% after 1934)
- Standard Oil of New York: 25% (41 2/3% after 1932, 50% after 1934)
- Pan American Petroleum & Transport Co.: 16 2/3% (shares sold in 1931 to Standard of NJ)
- Atlantic Refining Co.: 16 2/3% (shares sold in 1932 to Standard of NY)
- Gulf Oil: 16 2/3% (sold shares to the remaining two in 1934)

The Mexican Petroleum Company, Texaco and the Sinclair Consolidated Oil Corp. were originally in the group of companies attempting to gain access to the TPC, but dropped out along the way. (Mexican Petroleum was a >95% owned subsidiary of Pan American Petroleum & Transport since ca. 1923 with a controlling interest dating back to 1916). In April 1926, at the start of geological survey operations in Iraq, the 5 companies making up the "American group" were already the same as those initially interested in the NEDC.

The agreement, known as Red Line Agreement after a red line drawn around the former boundaries of the Ottoman Empire (with the exception of Kuwait), effectively bound the partners to act together within the red line. The writer Stephen Hemsley Longrigg, a former IPC employee, noted, "[T]he Red Line Agreement, variously assessed as a sad case of wrongful cartelization or as an enlightened example of international co‑operation and fair-sharing, was to hold the field for twenty years and in large measure determined the pattern and tempo of oil development over a large part of the Middle East". The Agreement lasted until 1948 when two of the American partners broke free. During the period, IPC monopolized oil exploration inside the Red Line; excluding Saudi Arabia and Bahrain, where Aramco and the Bahrain Petroleum Company obtained concessions.

On June 8, 1929, the TPC was renamed the Iraq Petroleum Company Limited.

=== Delayed production start ===
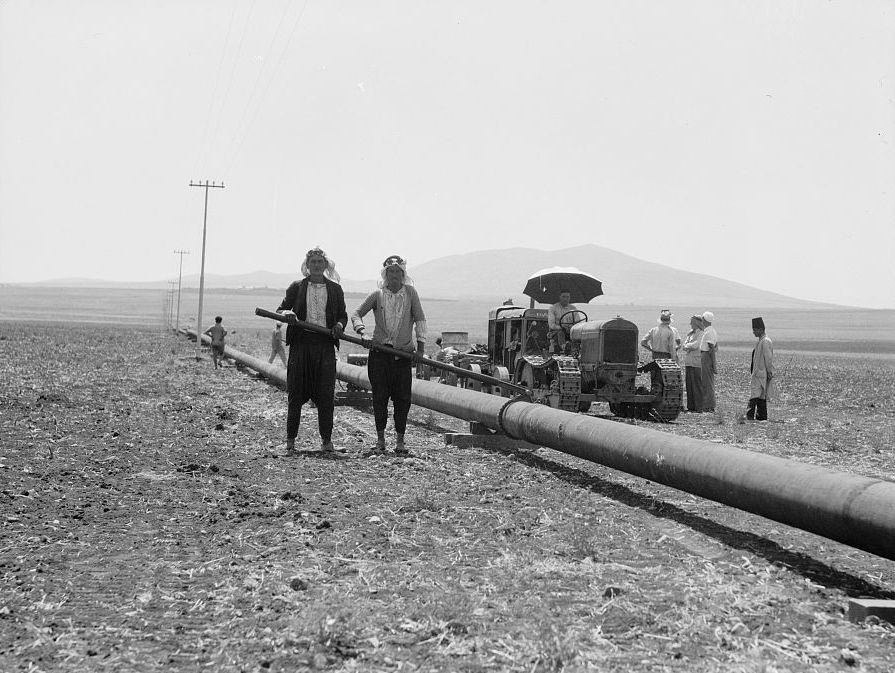
IPC assistants welding pipes together on the Esdraelon stretch in the 1930s.

The original concession of 14 March 1925 covered all of Iraq, but IPC was reluctant to develop it quickly and production was restricted to fields constituting only one-half of 1 percent of the country's total area. During the Great Depression, the world was awash with oil and greater output from Iraq would simply have driven the price down to even lower levels. Delaying tactics were employed not only in actual drilling and development, but also in conducting negotiations on such matters as pipeline rights-of-way.

The owners of IPC had conflicting interests: the Anglo-Persian Oil Company, Royal Dutch/Shell and Standard Oil had access to major sources of crude oil outside Iraq, and therefore wanted to hold the Iraqi concessions in reserve, whilst CFP and the other companies pushed for rapid development of Iraqi oil as they had limited crude oil supplies. These competing interests delayed the development of the Iraqi fields, and IPC's concession eventually expired because the companies failed to meet certain performance requirements, such as the construction of pipelines and shipping terminals. The concession was renegotiated in 1931, however, giving the company a 70-year concession on an enlarged 83,200 square kilometres (32,100 sq mi) area east of the Tigris River. In return, the Iraqi government demanded, and received, additional payments and loans, as well as the promise that IPC would complete two oil pipelines to the Mediterranean by 1935—something CFP had demanded for a long time, in order to get its share of the oil quickly to France.

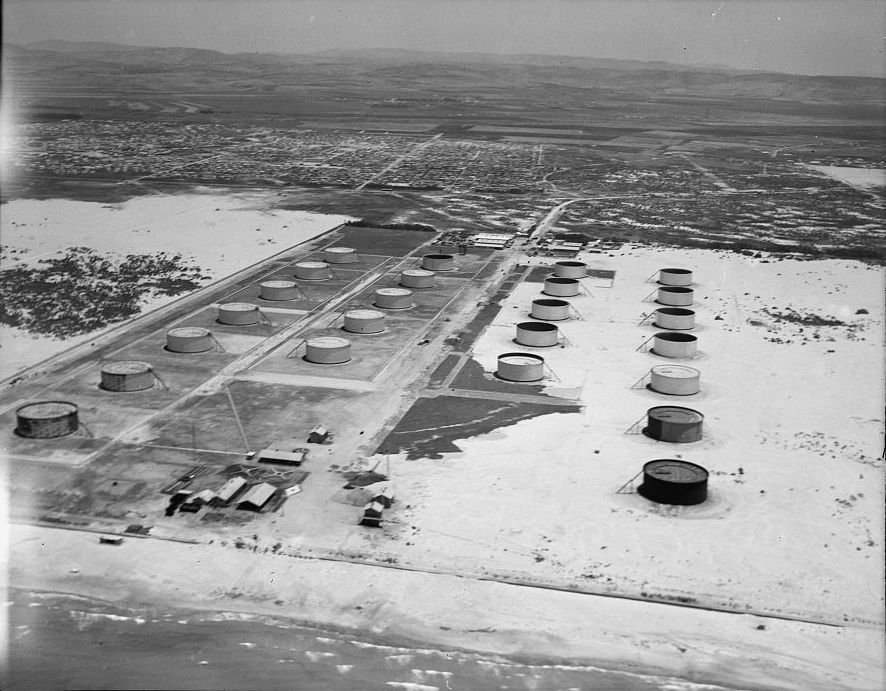
IPC oil tanks at Haifa.

Different routes and terminal locations on the Mediterranean coast were sought by the French, who favored a northern route through Syria and Lebanon terminating at the city of Tripoli on the Lebanese coast, and the British and the Iraqis who preferred a southern route, terminating at Haifa, in what then was Palestine. The issue was settled by a compromise which provided for the construction of two pipelines, each with a throughput capacity of 2,000,000 tons a year. The length of the Northern line would be 532 miles (856 km), that of the Southern line 620 miles (1,000 km).

=== The pipeline materializes ===
The pipeline was built in 2 years between the summer of 1932 and 1934, oil first arrived in Tripoli on July 14, 1934, and in Haifa on October 14, 1934 (seven years to the day after oil was first struck at the Baba Gurgur No. 1 well). Only in 1936, nine years after the discovery, did IPC export oil at the full capacity of the system.

The Kirkuk production averaged 4 million tons per year until World War II, when restricted shipping in the Mediterranean, Iraqi (Allied) hands on the valve that supplied (Axis) Tripoli, then Axis fingers on the Iraqi valve briefly during May 1941 and the unavailability of refinery capacity in occupied France, forced down the production sharply. Although the Iraq Government tried to open up the country to competition, the company taking up the new concession was bought out by IPC and, under the name of the Mosul Petroleum Company, was duly gathered into the IPC 'family' of associated companies (see below). The company also got the concession rights to southern Iraq in 1938, and founded the Basrah Petroleum Company (BPC) as their wholly owned subsidiary to develop the southern region of Iraq.

=== IPC partner disputes ===
Three issues caused protracted negotiations among the partner groups of IPC:

Revision of the Anglo-Iranian royalty: when the Iraq concession of 1925 was revised in March 1931, and IPC was granted a blanket concession over 32,000 square miles (83,000 km^{2}) of territory east of the Tigris River, the question arose as to whether Anglo-Persian's 10 percent royalty should be extended to include the new area. After lengthy negotiations the groups arrived at a compromise settlement in November 1934, which stipulated that D'Arcy Exploration (Anglo-Iranian) would be entitled to a 7.5-percent royalty on such oil as was produced from the 32,000 square miles (83,000 km^{2}) covered by the revised Iraq concession, the oil to be delivered free of cost at the field, with IPC paying the royalty due the Iraq Government.

Tax matters: since IPC was a British-chartered company, the British groups would not have been subject to double taxation. The non-British groups, however, did not relish the idea of having the earnings of IPC taxed once by the British Government and again by their own governments. Eventually the groups agreed to transfer all pipeline operations to IPC, and price crude to the groups on the basis of management's estimate of British income tax cost plus 1 shilling profit per ton. Under this plan IPC's profits were nominal and its tax liability to the British Government was relatively small.

Demise of the Red Line Agreement: two of the American oil companies in IPC were offered a partnership with Aramco to develop the oil resources of Saudi Arabia. Their partners in IPC refused to release them from the Red Line Agreement. After the Americans claimed that World War II had ended the Agreement, protracted legal proceedings with the French CFP and Gulbenkian followed. Eventually the case was settled out of court in November 1948 and the American partners joined ARAMCO. The French Government and Gulbenkian had withdrawn their objections in exchange for a greater share of IPC's output. IPC oil was to be allocated to the partners based on requirements, not fractional stake in the company, satisfying the most urgent French demand. Gulbenkian was given a bigger allowance to buy low and resell high. IPC committed to increase production. The laying of the long considered 30-inch loop to the Mediterranean was definitely decided on. In exchange, the Red Line agreement boundaries were redrawn to exclude Saudi Arabia, Yemen, Bahrain, "Egypt" (Note: Seems to be an obvious error in the cited reference. See Anglo-Egyptian Oilfields for evidence that several IPC members were active in Egypt independently, while IPC involvement seems to be entirely absent), Palestine, and the western-half of Jordan, i.e. areas in which IPC had no presence already. With the agreement, Jersey Standard and Socony, in effect, retroactively became shareholders in Aramco since March 12, 1947. Both had signed an agreement by which they guaranteed a $102 million loan at 2% interest taken on by Aramco. They were obligated to buy upon favourable settlement by the court for $76.5 million (Jersey) and $25.5 million (Socony) a respective 30% and 10% stake in Aramco, the proceeds of which to be used to repay the loan. And since Aramco could not refuse the eventual stock purchase, Socony and Jersey held an option with the right and the obligation to exercise on the stock. A separate loan of $125 million was arranged at the time for financing the construction of the Trans-Arabian Pipeline, for which Jersey and Socony also in part stood in with guarantees. The pipeline loan was however a standard financing instrument not connected to a stock purchase and was scheduled to be repaid at a rate of $5 million semi-annually between 1951 and 1961. A stock option on Trans-Arabian Pipeline Co. was however part of the deal of March 12, 1947. In addition to the $76.5 + $25.5 million for the purchase of Aramco shares (executed Dec 2, 1948), the two American companies also paid $3,456,501.66 to settle a royalty controversy with the Saudi government and forfeited their share on a total of $367,234,758 of dividends paid by Aramco in the following years. Resulting in an apparent total of $252,350,404.86. According to the experts in the total was about $450 million, but their math contradicts their prose. (Note: "Jersey and Socony's shares in Aramco were excluded from participation until the aggregate amount of dividends paid on SOCAL and Texaco's shares equaled ...". (of the $15 million dividends paid to SOCAL and Texaco exclusively in 1949 (or cumulatively carried over), Jersey's and Socony's loss would not have been $15 million, but 40% of $15 million))

=== IPC-Government relations ===
During the Hashemite Monarchy (1932–58), there were no serious issues between the IPC and the Iraqi government as the Hashemites were extremely pro-west. In fact, they had been installed by the British, and therefore tensions were minimized. They were dependent on the British militarily and had essentially pledged allegiance to them through the Baghdad Pact. The Hashemites' main disputes centered on increasing the amount of crude oil extracted, getting more Iraqis involved in the process of producing the oil and getting more royalties. In 1952, terms that were more generous to the Iraqi government were negotiated. These terms were largely based on the far more lucrative terms of the Saudi-Aramco "50/50" agreement of December 1950. One could argue that a determinant in these negotiations was the friendly atmosphere in which they were conducted.

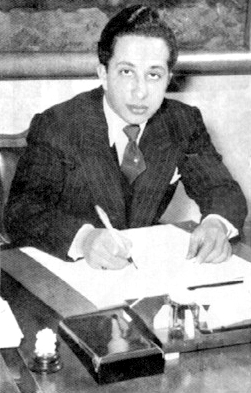
King Faisal II of Iraq who was assassinated in 1958.

This atmosphere did not continue to the negotiations held between the IPC and revolutionary governments that followed the overthrow of the Hashemite monarchy in 1958. Relations between the two can be examined on two major factors. First, oil was a vital part of the Iraqi economy. Because of this, the IPC had a huge impact on the amount of revenue that the government generated and thus had a certain amount of influence over the government. The second major factor was inability of the Iraqi government at that time to source the technical knowledge and skill necessary to take over oil operations in the country.

=== The Qasim era ===
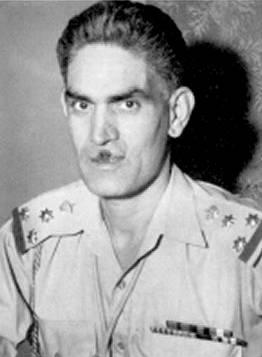
Abd al-Karim Qasim: 1st Prime Minister of the Republic of Iraq, in office 14 July 1958 – 8 February 1963.

Beginning in the early 1950s, as the strength of nationalism in Iraq grew, the focus came to bear on foreign control over the oil production of the country. Abd al-Karim Qasim was a nationalist Iraqi Army general who seized power in a 1958 coup d'état in which the Iraqi monarch was murdered. He ruled the country as Prime Minister of Iraq until his downfall and death in 1963. Before the coup, he used the fact that the IPC was producing oil for western nations rather than for the benefit of Iraqi citizens as one of his main points of contention with the Iraqi government. Once in power, he was critical of several aspects of the IPC. First, he was critical of the monetary arrangement between the IPC and the government. He also did not appreciate the monopoly that the IPC had been granted.

However the economic situation at the time did not permit Qasim to nationalize the IPC – western nations had boycotted Iranian oil when Mosaddegh nationalized its oil company and could be expected to do the same in this case. (It is likely that nationalization would have been Qasim's favored route had he had the necessary capabilities). Further, Iraqis lacked the technical and managerial capabilities to run the IPC. Qasim needed the oil revenues to run his government and to keep the military satisfied. Therefore, Qasim resorted to many other tactics including increasing transit rates at Basra by 1,200%. In response, the IPC stopped producing oil that used Basra as a shipping point. The ensuing confrontation was the lowest point in relations between the two up to this point.

On 12 December 1961, the Iraqi government enacted Law No. 80, which expropriated 99.5 per cent of the IPC group's concession areas without compensation and put an immediate stop on oil exploration. Law 80 did not impact the IPC's ongoing production at Az Zubair and Kirkuk, but all other territories, including North Rumaila, were returned to Iraqi state control. One major difference between these negotiations and those of 1952, was the stance of the Iraqi government. Whereas it had been more willing to accommodate the IPC in 1952, the government's positions under Qasim were largely non-negotiable. However this should not be surprising because it was expected that Qasim would take advantage of growing Arab nationalism and a sense amongst many ordinary Iraqis that they were being exploited by the west.

=== 1972 nationalization ===
Throughout the 1960s, the Iraqi government criticized the IPC and used the IPC as a central piece of their anti-western propaganda. The Soviet-Iraqi agreement of 1969 emboldened the Iraqi government and in 1970 they made a list of demands including ownership of 20% of the company's assets and more control. The IPC by this time was taking the Iraqi government very seriously and made some huge concessions. They agreed to increase oil production substantially and also increase the price of its crude oil in certain areas. They also offered an advance payment on royalties.

However this was not enough for the Iraqi government and they issued a new set of demands in November 1970 which essentially involved more Iraqi control of operations and more Iraqi profit-taking. Dissatisfied with the IPC's unwillingness to negotiate on Iraq's terms, the Iraqi government gave the IPC an ultimatum with similar demands in May 1972. The IPC tried to offer a compromise solution but the Ba'athist government rejected the offer and, on 1 June 1972, nationalized IPC operations, which were taken over by the Iraq National Oil Company.

The Kirkuk field still forms the basis for northern Iraqi oil production. Kirkuk has over 10 billion barrels (1.6 km^{3}) of remaining proven oil reserves. The Jambur, Bai Hassan, and Khabbaz fields are the only other currently producing oil fields in northern Iraq. While Iraq's northern oil industry remained relatively unscathed during the Iran-Iraq War, an estimated 60% of the facilities in southern and central Iraq were damaged in the Gulf War. Post-1991 fighting between Kurdish and Iraqi forces in northern Iraq resulted in temporary sabotage of the Kirkuk field's facilities. In 1996, production capacity in northern and central Iraq was estimated at between 0.7 and 1 million barrels (110,000 to 160,000 m^{3}) per day, down from around 1.2 million barrels (190,000 m^{3}) per day before the Gulf War.

== Affiliated companies inside Iraq ==
=== Mosul Petroleum Co., Ltd. ===
The British Oil Development Co., Ltd. (BOD) was organized in 1928 with 60% held by British and 40% by Italian interests. In 1930, the company was divided between British (45%), Italian (31%), German (12%) and Franco-Swiss (12%) shareholders. BOD obtained on April 20, 1932, a 75-year concession (full text:) over a vast area west of the Tigris river and north of the 33rd parallel, depicted by a World Petroleum map of September 1932. The B.O.D. with the concession came into possession of 7 wells already drilled on the Quiyarah field, southwest of Mosul, where many years ago German prospectors had struck minor quantities and which was (thus?) explored by the Turkish Petroleum Co. after it had gained the concession from Iraq in 1925. Oil was found at a depth of 780 feet on October 13, 1927, two days before Baba Gurgur No. 1 struck oil. It was however of low quality, heavy and with high sulfur content, and TPC concentrated on its discovery east of the Tigris at Kirkuk. As for transportation, the BOD had preliminary plans to lay a 500-mile 12-inch pipeline to Alexandretta (Iskenderun), close to the existing railway line with obvious logistical benefits.

On November 23, 1932, control of BOD passed to the new Mosul Oil Fields Ltd., representing Italian, British and German interests. Italy's state controlled AGIP acquired a 52% interest in 1935, but with the chairman of the board still British as per a stipulation in the concession agreement. An alternative mode of transportation was contemplated: to finish the Berlin-Baghdad railway to Mosul and to move the heavy oil unsuitable for pipeline transportation by train to the coast instead. BOD, still active as the operating subsidiary of Mosul Oil Fields increased the number of drilling rigs from 9 to 16 in 1935. The railway line was then in fact completed.

In the summer of 1936 IPC acquired majority ownership of Mosul Oil Fields from the Italian AGIP, which was in financial trouble and by 1937 IPC had acquired essentially all the stock. IPC created the Mosul Holdings Ltd. on October 14, 1938, whose structure conformed to the Red Line Agreement. In 1941, IPC changed the name of Mosul Holdings to Mosul Petroleum Co., Ltd, and dissolved BOD and Mosul Oilfields in 1944.

In 1939 IPC provided the Iraqi government with a £3,000,000 ($15 million) interest free loan, which was effectively an advance on royalty payments and gained in return changes to the concession agreement, one of those changes extended the non-production period of Mosul Oil Fields, which was to end in October 1939, another 7 years to 1946.

Drilling in the Qaiyarah district was extensive.

Wells in the Qaiyarah district at end of 1945
Field	Discovered	Shut-in wells
Qaiyrah	1927	39
Najmah	1933	20
Jawan	1933	5
Qasab	1935	5
Total		69

== IPC Group operations outside Iraq ==
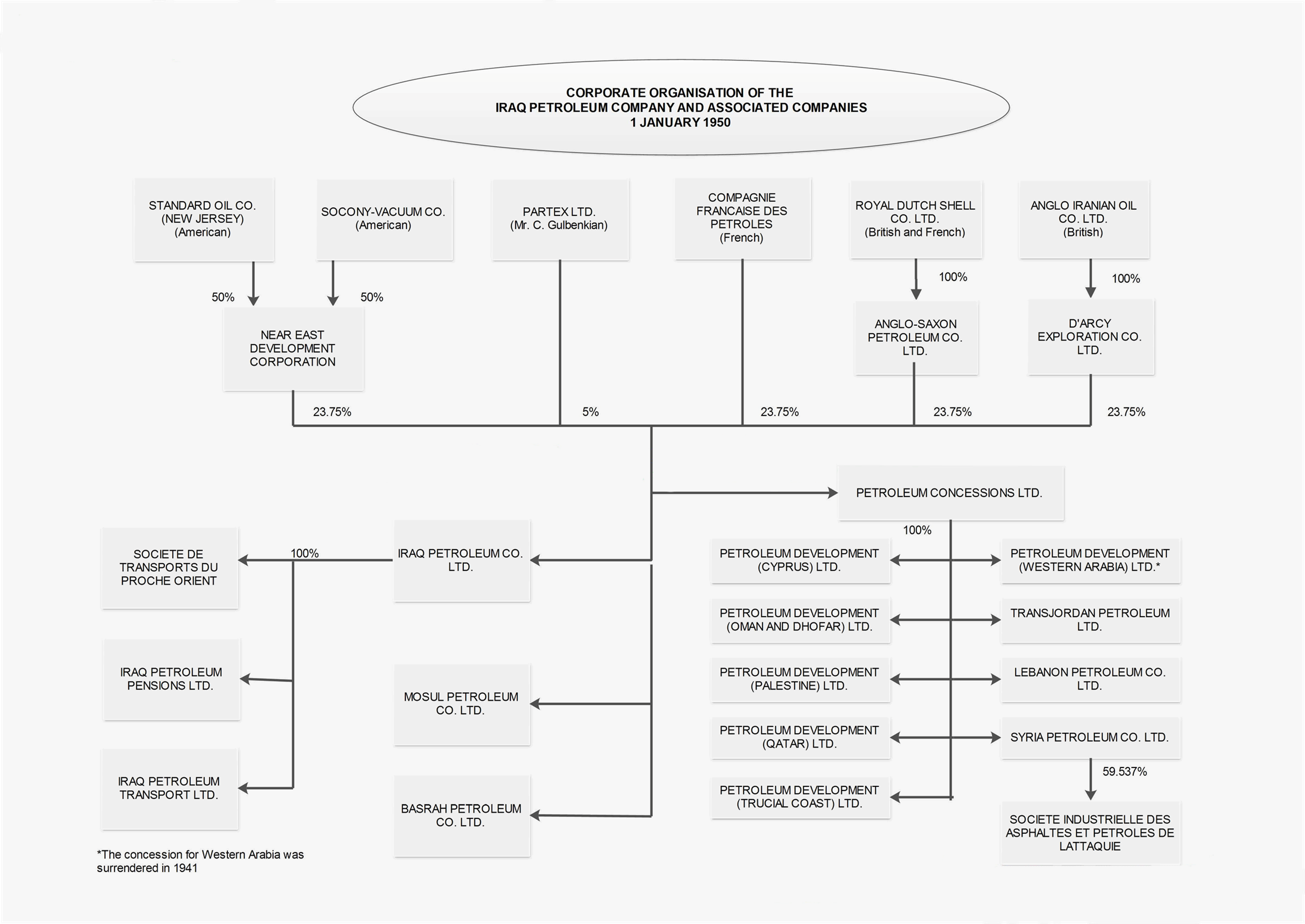
The corporate organisation of the Iraq Petroleum Company and its associated companies, 1 January 1950.

As the Red Line Agreement defined the company's sphere of operations well beyond the boundaries of Iraq, IPC's shareholders were keen to look for oil elsewhere in the Middle East. They created associated companies, one for each territory to be explored. These companies were collectively known as "The IPC Group". They would obtain from the sovereign power an exploration licence covering simple exploration over a defined geographical area, or a concession permitting exploration and the production of oil.

Petroleum Concessions, Ltd. was formed as a holding company in October 1935, mainly because there was a representative of the Iraqi government on the IPC board and it was thought to be inadvisable to negotiate with other countries directly. By 1948, the company had created 12 companies with concessions or exploration licences:

=== Unsuccessful ===
==== Cyprus ====
Petroleum Development (Cyprus) Ltd obtained in April 1938 a 2-year exploration permit covering 2,000 square miles. With field work and geological surveys underway the permit was renewed each year until IPC announced in December 1948 that the effort would be abandoned.

==== Lebanon ====
Lebanon Petroleum Company Ltd was originally founded as Petroleum Concessions (Syria and Lebanon) Ltd., in March 1938 obtained from the Lebanese Republic an exploration permit covering 500 square kilometers. Operations were suspended during World War 2. The company renewed the permit for 3 more years in 1948 and changed its name. Some drilling was done afterwards (near Tripoli, one hole was drilled to 10,000 feet), but nothing was found.

==== Palestine ====
Petroleum Development (Palestine) Ltd obtained 11 licenses on February 24, 1939, and 18 licenses on July 21, 1939, in total covering 5,265 square miles (53% of the land area of Mandatory Palestine). Operations were suspended during World War 2, as drilling equipment could not be obtained. The government agreed to a postponement of drilling obligations until after the war or until equipment would become available. The company began drilling 15 miles south of Gaza on September 25, 1947, but this effort was abandoned in February 1948 because of the new crisis. The company also drilled to a depth of 3,464 feet near Hulayqat. On September 22, 1955, oil was struck from the same hole deepened to 4,906 feet, resulting in Israels first producing well in the country's first oil field: Heletz.

==== Syria ====
Syrian Petroleum Company Ltd obtained a concession from the Syrian government dated February 26, 1938, covering all of Syria north of the parallel running through Damascus (36 degrees 18 minutes), in total 63,000 square miles. The concession provided for dead rent starting at £15,000 per year rising to £80,000 over a 15-year period, after which the concession would become void if no oil is exported. Drilling operations started in 1939 and continued until 1941. Most of the equipment was destroyed by the British military. The Syrian government granted a moratorium on obligations, due to the war. After the war, IPC drilled Baflioum (northwest of Aleppo) to 8,666 feet and Dola (southeast of Aleppo in the Palmyra Basin) to 6,163 feet, found nothing and abandoned the holes in 1948. IPC began drilling at Abba in October 1948 and at Gouna, northwest of Abba on January 5, 1949. IPC surrendered nearly one third (22,000 aquare miles) in February 1949 to the MenHall concession, named after Syrian-born American James W. MenHall of Benton, Illinois. IPC drilled a total 10 or 11 holes and the deepest to 10,163 feet, but after $17 million spent on the effort only found small amounts of natural gas at Ghouna No. 1. IPC left the area in the northeast of the country where MenHall later got lucky in 1951 and left Syria entirely in 1954.

==== Jordan ====
Petroleum Development (Transjordan) Ltd was founded in February 1938. It applied for a total of 37 licenses of which none were granted, until a concession was obtained and signed in Amman on May 10, 1947, giving the company an exclusive concession for the country for 75 years. IPC in a meeting on June 9, 1949, considered abandoning this concession. The IPC concession was terminated in 1954. in 1957-58 Edwin W. Pauley (independent) did considerable geologic exploration and drilled 3 deep wells, all dry. Phillips Petroleum Co. later joined the effort and drilled a further 6 deep but dry holes and their efforts ended in 1960.

==== Saudi Arabia (west coast) ====
Petroleum Development (Western Arabia) Ltd. in 1936 took over an existing 60-year concession covering 55,000 square miles on the western coast of Saudi Arabia between Yemen and Transjordan. A geological examination found no prospects for oil and the concession was surrendered in March 1941. The area consisted of two strips spanning the entire Red Sea cost of Saudi Arabia (to a depth of 62 miles), with the exception of an area around Mecca/Jedda, as depicted in a World Petroleum 1947-02 map.

=== Successful ===
==== Qatar ====
Petroleum Development (Qatar) Ltd was incorporated in August 1936. On October 3, 1936 it took over the concession won by APOC on May 17, 1935. Oil was struck in January 1940, but development was halted during World War II and restarted at the end of 1947. The first shipment of oil sailed on December 31, 1949. IPC discovered and controlled only the onshore Dukhan field. Shell subsequently won the offshore concession, which ultimately yielded the greater part of Qatar's reserves.

==== Others ====
- Petroleum Development (Trucial Coast) Ltd
- Petroleum Development (Oman and Dhofar) Ltd
  - The company gained permission from the Sultanate of Muscat and Oman on June 24, 1937, to operate on certain areas. With it came an option for a 75-year concession, which the company exercised on May 14, 1944. As of 1950 no oil was found and IPC considered abandoning the area. Petroleum Development Oman emerged from this company.
- Petroleum Concessions Ltd (for the Aden Protectorates)

In 1933, IPC joined negotiations for an oil concession in Al-Hasa province, Saudi Arabia, bidding against Standard Oil of California (SOCAL, later renamed Chevron). Represented by Stephen Hemsley Longrigg, the company's bid failed when it offered payment in rupees rather than the gold that King Abdul-Aziz (also known as Ibn Saud) desired. SOCAL gained the concession and, joined by the Texas Oil Company in 1936, went on to discover oil at Dammam through its subsidiary, California-Arabian Standard Oil Company (Casoc) in 1938. Thereafter, IPC concentrated its efforts in Arabia in developing its Qatar oil concession (oil discovered 1939), Abu Dhabi (oil discovered in 1959), Oman (see Petroleum Development Oman) and the Aden Protectorates (in today's Yemen). IPC personnel carried out a series of ground-breaking explorations in southern Arabia during these years.

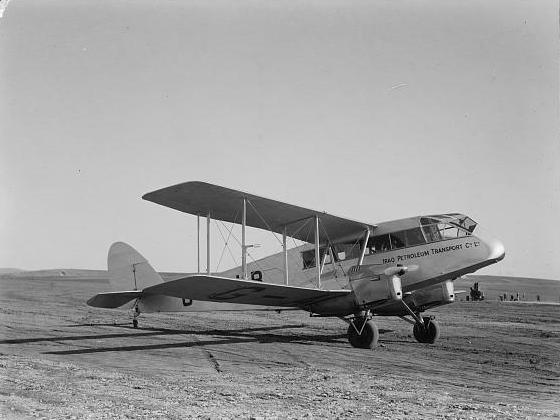
A de Havilland Dragon of the Iraq Petroleum Transport Company in the 1930s

The failure of IPC to secure concessions in Bahrain and Saudi Arabia should not obscure the fact that elsewhere in the Middle East the company was successful in closing the "open door" of commercial opportunity to outsiders. The principal competitors for concessions were British Oil Development Co. Ltd.(BOD), and SOCAL. When BOD became interested in concessions in northern Iraq, IPC eventually bought them out. So successful were its efforts that by the end of 1944 IPC was operating in over 467,055 square miles (1,209,670 km^{2}) of territory, an area larger in size than the states of Texas, Oklahoma, Arkansas, and Louisiana combined. In addition, IPC attempted, though without success, to extend further its area of operations by seeking concessions or exploration permits in Turkey and in the neutral zones of Kuwait and Saudi Arabia.

In 1937, IPC signed an oil concession agreement with the Sultan of Muscat that would cover the entire region of the Sultanate. IPC, however, failed to discover oil in the Sultanate's region, which was limited to the coastal area of Oman, and informed the Sultan that oil is more likely to exist in the interior region of Oman. The Treaty of Seeb provided autonomous rule to the Omanis who resided in the interior region of Oman, which was called the Imamate of Oman, by stating that the Sultanate "should not interfere in their [Imamate] internal affairs". IPC offered financial support to the Sultan in order to raise a military force that would occupy the Imamate's region so that IPC would gain access to the possible oil reserves. The Sultanate, backed by the British government and the financial support received from IPC, attacked the interior of Oman on 25 October 1954 triggering Jebel Akhdar War.

IPC was also interested in other ventures apart from oil, such as potash mining in Trans-Jordan, asphalt in Syria (for which it set up a company, Société Industrielle des Asphaltes et Pétroles de Lattique) and salt mining in the Aden Protectorates - although this latter venture was never developed. The company created air transport companies, the Iraq Petroleum Transport Company and Transports du Proche Orient, to operate aircraft and vessels to ferry people and equipment to the remoter parts of its concession areas.

== IPC today ==
IPC has ceased operations, but the company "Iraq Petroleum Company Limited" still remains extant as a name on paper, and one of its surviving associated companies – Abu Dhabi Petroleum Company (ADPC), formerly Petroleum Development (Trucial Coast) Limited – continued with the original shareholding intact until January 2014. ADPC still holds 40% of the onshore concession in Abu Dhabi, with the majority 60% held by the Abu Dhabi National Oil Company (ADNOC) on behalf of the Abu Dhabi Government. Operations are carried out by the local operating company – the Abu Dhabi Company for Onshore Oil Operations (ADCO) – jointly owned by ADNOC, and the ADPC shareholders: BP, Royal Dutch Shell, ExxonMobil, TotalEnergies and Partex; reflecting the historical make-up of the Iraq Petroleum Company. The Abu Dhabi onshore oil concession expired in January 2014.

Abu Dhabi Petroleum Company Limited was dissolved on 4 October 2018, while Iraq Petroleum Company Limited still exists, now using company number 09646587 instead of 00113948. "New" Iraq Petroleum Company Limited was incorporated on 18 June 2015 as "BP Newco 1 Limited" and succeeded operations of "old" Iraq Petroleum Company, Limited, which dissolved on 30 December 2015.

== Publications and films ==
In 1948, IPC published its Handbook of the Territories which Form the Theatre of Operations of the Iraq Petroleum Company Limited and its Associated Companies. The IPC Film Unit produced a number of short films, most notably The Third River, a film produced in 1952 about the construction of the Kirkuk-Banias pipeline, and Rivers of Time, produced in 1957, about the history of Mesopotamia. Ageless Iraq was an historical film made for IPC by British Pathé. The company published a monthly magazine, entitled Iraq Petroleum, from August 1951 until April/May 1957. An insert in the January 1957 edition read "In the light of present circumstances it has been found necessary to restrict the production of Iraq Petroleum and... publication will be bi-monthly until further notice." An in-house company magazine, The Crescent, continued in print until the 1970s. The IPC Newsletter, a quarterly magazine for IPC pensioners, was issued between 1974 and 2014.

== See also ==
- Baba Gurgur
- Abd al-Karim Qasim
- Anglo-Iraqi War
- Oil reserves in Iraq
- Red Line Agreement
