= Red Line Agreement =

1928 business agreement creating a regional oil cartel

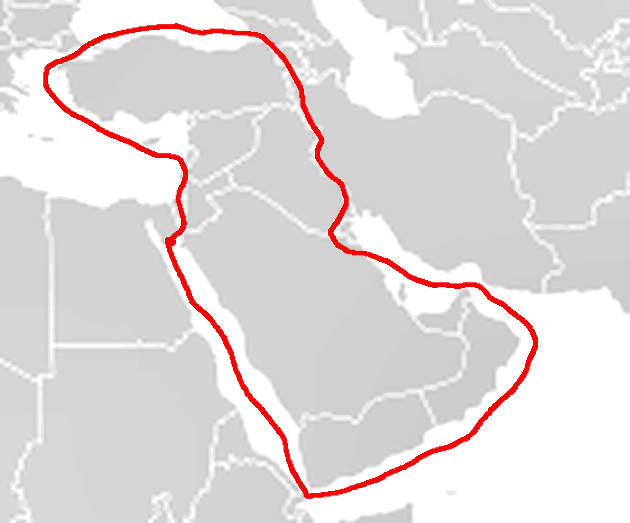
Regions concerned by the Red Line Agreement

The Red Line Agreement is an agreement signed by partners in the Turkish Petroleum Company (TPC) on July 31, 1928, in Ostend, Belgium. The agreement was signed between the Anglo-Persian Oil Company (later renamed British Petroleum), Royal Dutch Shell, Compagnie Française des Pétroles (later renamed Total), Near East Development Corporation (a consortium of American oil companies, including the predecessors of ExxonMobil) and Calouste Gulbenkian (Mr. Five Percent), who retained a 5% share. The aim of the agreement was to formalize the corporate structure of TPC and bind all partners to a "self-denial clause" that prohibited any of its shareholders from independently seeking oil interests in the ex-Ottoman territory. It marked the creation of an oil monopoly, or cartel, of immense influence, spanning a vast territory. The cartel preceded the Organization of Petroleum Exporting Countries (OPEC), which was formed in 1960. The essence of the Red Line Agreement was already formulated in clause 10 of the Association Agreement of March 19, 1914 by which the Anglo-Persian Oil Company joined the TPC.

The Red Line Agreement was signed following the discovery of the immense Baba Gurgur oil field in Iraq and TPC gained a concession for Iraq. Under the terms of the agreement, each of the four parties received a 23.75% share of all the crude oil produced by TPC. The remaining 5% share went to Gulbenkian, who was a partial stakeholder within the TPC. In 1929, TPC was renamed the Iraq Petroleum Company, or IPC.

As Giacomo Luciani (2013) writes:

"Having formed IPC, [Calouste] Gulbenkian insisted that participants in the consortium sign what became known as the Red Line Agreement (Yergin 1991: 203–6). The red line was drawn on a map to define the territories formerly under the sovereignty of the Ottoman Empire, and the agreement stated that participants in the IPC consortium pledged to be involved in the exploitation of any oil to be discovered within the red line exclusively through consortia with the same composition as the IPC. Hence, if one of the IPC consortium members were to discover any oil or obtain a concession elsewhere within the red line, it would have to offer this asset to the remaining members in the same ‘geometry’ as in the IPC."

It has been said that, at a meeting in 1928, Gulbenkian drew a red line on a map of the Middle East demarcating the boundaries of the area where the self-denial clause would be in effect. Gulbenkian said this was the boundary of the Ottoman Empire he knew in 1914. The other partners did not object. They had already anticipated such a boundary (according to some accounts, the “red line” was not drawn by Gulbenkian but by a French representative). Except for Gulbenkian, the partners were the supermajors of today. Within the “red line” was the former Ottoman territory in the Middle East including the Arabian Peninsula (plus Turkey) but excluding Kuwait. Kuwait was excluded as it was meant to be a preserve for the British.

Years later, Walter C. Teagle of Standard Oil of New Jersey remarked that the agreement was “a damn bad move”. However, it served to define the sphere of operations of TPC's successor, the Iraq Petroleum Company (IPC). The writer Stephen Hemsley Longrigg, a former IPC employee, noted that "the Red Line Agreement, variously assessed as a sad case of wrongful cartelization or as an enlightened example of international co‑operation and fair-sharing, was to hold the field for twenty years and in large measure determined the pattern and tempo of oil development over a large part of the Middle East". Apart from Saudi Arabia and Bahrain where Saudi Aramco and Bahrain Petroleum Company prevailed, IPC monopolized oil exploration inside the Red Line during this period.

American oil companies Standard Oil of New Jersey and Socony-Vacuum were partners in IPC and therefore bound by the Red Line Agreement. When they were offered a partnership with ARAMCO to develop the oil resources of Saudi Arabia, their partners in IPC refused to release them from the agreement. After the Americans claimed that World War II had ended the Red Line Agreement, protracted legal proceedings with Gulbenkian followed. Eventually the case was settled out of court and the American partners were allowed to join ARAMCO. The Red Line Agreement became a legacy document after this date, as IPC continued to operate existing concessions under its terms but the shareholder companies were allowed to independently seek new oil concessions across the Middle East.

== Sources ==
- Demirmen, "Oil in Iraq: The Byzantine Beginnings: Part II: The Reign of a Monopoly", Global Policy Forum, April 26, 2003.
- Black, Edwin. Banking on Baghdad (John Wiley and Sons, New York 2003) and the only available map and transcription see www.bankingonbaghdad.com . For a complete minute to minute history of the Red Line Agreement see the referenced book.
- Black, Edwin. British Petroleum and the Red Line Agreement: The West's Secret Pact to Get Mideast Oil (Dialog Press 2011).
