= National Bank of Turkey =

The National Bank of Turkey was a commercial bank in Turkey founded in 1909. The majority capital came from founding shareholders Sir Ernest Cassel, Lord Revelstoke and Sir Alexander Henderson. The initial impetus for the bank's creation came about as a result of the Young Turk Revolution. The bank operated until 1931.

== Prior namesake ventures ==
Before the founding of the National Bank of Turkey in 1909, two prior initiatives had used the same name, generally referred to by their French name Banque Nationale de Turquie. The first one was promoted by French entrepreneur Ariste Jacques Trouvé-Chauvel, considered by the Ottoman government in 1853, but not implemented.

A second iteration went somewhat farther, as on 28 February 1873 sultan Abdulaziz granted a firman to Tunisian-French financier Mahmoud Ben Ayed with a "privilege of a bank that shall take the name of National Bank of Turkey". The outline of that venture had been set at a July 1872 meeting in Constantinople of Ben Ayed with Ottoman-Egyptian royal Mustafa Fazıl Pasha, minister Riza Pasha, and Ottoman-Greek official Kiamil Bey. The National Bank's statute was published in Paris in 1874, with its seat in Constantinople and Ben Ayed elected its chairman for a five-year term. There is no indication, however, that the entity subsequently engaged in any significant activity.

== Background of British Interests ==
Britain and France had signed the Entente Cordiale in 1904; in Constantinople, the French financiers were predominant through the Imperial Ottoman Bank leading to an attempt to improve the British position via the creation of a new Anglo-French financial enterprise, the Ottoman Society. Progress was slow due to French reluctance to dilute their competitive position and then overtaken by news in late 1908 of the proposed National Bank of Turkey (NBT) which, according to the Foreign Office was "not initiated or suggested by us, and is carried out independently of us". Cassel, who was to have been involved in the Ottoman Society, also turned out to be involved with NBT, later bringing in Henderson and then Revelstoke. The Foreign office was kept informed at all stages and Edward Grey later in 1909 played a part in securing the services of Henry Babington Smith as President of NBT, later saying in a memorandum of an interview with a member of the London Committee of the Ottoman Bank:

"... we had no interest in Sir Ernest Cassel's Bank. The Turks had taken the initiative and had arranged the matter independently with Sir Ernest Cassel... I had certainly supported the scheme to the extent of encouraging Sir Henry Babington Smith to accept Sir Ernest Cassel's offer. The selection had been made by Sir Ernest Cassel himself."

and when asked whether the Foreign Office intended to give exclusive support to Cassel's Bank in obtaining concessions at Constantinople, Grey replied:

"..that if need be, we should certainly represent to the Turks that an institution which had been brought into existence as a direct result of their own initiative and representations ought not to be excluded from concessions. But when occasion arose for me to support the Bank's claims I should do what I could to encourage co-operation with French finance."

== Founding ==
The Young Turks had asked Boghos Nubar Pasha and Calouste Gulbenkian to form NBT, as evidenced by a letter of 7 December 1908 that included an NBT prospectus, from Frederick Lane (shipping broker, Rothschilds’ agent and Gulbenkian associate) to Hugo Loudon of Royal Dutch Shell.

== Mesopotamian Oil ==
In the early 1900s Deutsche Bank, through the Anatolian Railway Company had mineral and oil exploration rights in a 20 km strip either side of the proposed route from Konia to the Persian Gulf. William D’Arcy, who had the Persian oil concession since 1901, also sought a concession in Mesopotamia and by 1907, were in the running due to the German side having been lax in procedure. The same year, Royal Dutch Shell (RDS) opened a Constantinople office, run by Gulbenkian. In 1908, following the Young Turk revolution, everybody had to start over. In 1908, D'Arcy incorporated as D'Arcy Exploration Co. and transferred all his oil claims in Mesopotamia and Persia to Anglo-Persian Oil Company (APOC). More interested parties and more schemes appeared on the scene, though by 1912, nothing had really changed.

During 1912, Gulbenkian was setting the foundation for a new scheme, the Turkish Petroleum Company, owned as to 50% by NBT (inclusive 15% nonvoting beneficial to Gulbenkian), 25% RDS and 25% Deutsche Bank (in consideration of their oil claims).

On 19 March 1914, the British and German governments signed an agreement whereby the interest of NBT in TPC was transferred to APOC.

== Later Developments ==
In 1918-1919 the NBT was acquired by the British Trade Corporation (BTC), an investment bank that had been created in 1917 to support the war effort. BTC in turn merged in 1926-1927 with the Anglo-Austrian Bank (established in 1863) to form the Anglo-International Bank. What remained of the NBT was eventually wound up in 1931.

== See also ==
- Mehmed Cavid
- Ottoman Bank
- Banque de Salonique
- Deutsche Orientbank
