= Anglo-Egyptian Oilfields =

Oil production in Egypt
Year	Barrels
<1911	0
1911	21,000
1912	214,000
1913	98,000
1914	753,000
1915	212,000
1916	404,000
1917	943,000
1918	1,935,000
1919	1,517,000
1920	1,042,000
1921	1,255,000
1922	1,188,000
1923	1,054,000
1924	1,122,000
1925	1,226,000
1926	1,188,000
1927	1,267,000
1928	1,842,000
1929	1,868,000
1930	1,996,000
1931	2,038,000
1932	1,895,000
1933	1,663,000
1934	1,546,000
1935	1,301,000
1936	1,278,000
1937	1,196,000
1938	1,581,000
1939	4,666,000
1940	6,505,000
1941	8,546,000
1942	8.275,000
1943	8,953,000
1944	9,416,000
1945	9,406,000
1946	9,070,000
1947	8,627,000

Anglo-Egyptian Oilfields Limited was an oil company registered in London, England on 6 July 1911 with a capital of £676,000 (£226,000 Anglo-Saxon Petroleum (Royal Dutch Shell), £450,000 Red Sea Oilfields Ltd) with oilfields in Egypt. It was a subsidiary of Royal Dutch Shell.

Egypt was the first oil producing country in the Middle East, even before Iran, but production was quite insignificant compared to the region's major oil producing countries.

The company headquarter was moved from London to Cairo in 1951 and taxes where henceforth paid to the Egyptian government, except those on dividends paid to UK residents. The company board for the first time met on July 10 in the newly build 10-story Shell House headquarters in which the Shell Company of Egypt Ltd and Anglo-Iranian Oil Co. (Egypt) Ltd were co-tenants.

The capital structure of the company (par value and number of shares issued) did not change between 1920 and 1954. In 1920 it was £1,350,000 (all issued) and as a typical part of the combine owned 60% by Royal Dutch and 40% by Shell. On May 31, 1956 the capital was increased to £5,665,500 and one bonus share issued for each two shares (i.e. a 1 1/2:1 stock split). The company properties were sequestered by order of Egyptian authorities on November 2, 1956 (Suez Crisis) and de-sequestered on April 21, 1959 and this was finalized on July 11, 1959 with control passing back to the former owners. In July 1961 the government of the United Arab Republic acquired a 55% shareholding in the company. (Note: Previously the government owned 9.6%, Shell and BP each owned 30.9%, 6% was held by private British investors and 22% by private UAR interests. The government increased its share to 55%, cutting in half the holding of all other groups in exchange for 15-year 4% government bonds to the amount of £2.07 for each £1 share acquired based on latest quotation on the Cairo Stock Exchange. The total outstanding capital was about £5.5 million (par value). The stock price had been on the decline for some time though owing to the uncertain business conditions and the lack of new exploration by AEO.) It was renamed as the Al Nasr Oilfields Company on 4 January 1962, and was converted into a United Arab Republic Company. It seems to have been nationalised in 1964, and news reports cite Gamal Abdel Nasser's seizing in 1964 while Skinner's Oil and petroleum year book suggests 1951 control.

== Oil fields ==
=== exclusive ===
The Gemsah field (27°39′N 33°35′E) was discovered in 1908 and yielded light oil of 41° API gravity, but the total amount was only 1,442,098 barrels over its lifetime.

The Hurghada field (27°15′N 33°47′E) was discovered in 1913, production peaked in 1931 (1,800,000bbl). Produced 302,200bbl in 1951 from 23 pumping wells and there were 5 shut-in wells. The oil was relatively heavy (22° - 30° API)

The Ras Gharib field (28°22′N 33°4′E) was discovered in 1938. (Note: A test well started on December 1, 1937 struck oil at 2,500ft on April 12, 1938 with the first shipment made August 8, 1938. AEO had also drilled a 1,275ft and a 3,745ft dry hole in 1921-1925 5km south of the eventual discovery.) In 1951 8,036,900bbl were produced from 14 flowing, 70 pumping, 17 gas-lift and 26 shut-in wells.

=== jointly with Socony-Vacuum ===
The Sudr field (29°36′N 32°45′E) in 1951 produced 3,726,400bbl of 19°-23° API gravity from 8 flowing, 1 pumping and 6 shut-in wells. Connected to Sudr anchorage by a 6-inch and a 10-inch pipe line.

The Asl field (29°28′N 32°51′E) was discovered in 1948. Linked to Sudr terminal by 6-inch and 10-inch pipeline. 22° API oil.

The Ras Matarma field (29°32′N 32°49′E) was discovered in 1948.

On the Nebwi Lease (29°19′N 32°52′E) seven dry holes were drilled and #7 abandoned at a depth of 5,292 ft on Nov 11, 1950, presumably the last hole drilled on the lease.

== Other facilities ==
The Suez refinery (29°58′N 32°31′E) 1.5 miles southwest of the Suez town center was co-located with the government refinery located 3 miles southwest of the center. A twin 12-inch products pipeline (28,000 - 40,000 tons per month) from the Shell jetties at Suez led to a tank farm and pumping station (30°4′N 32°23′E) near Agrud and from there 75 miles of 6-inch pipe to the Ghamra terminal (30°5′N 31°17′E) east of Cairo. There was also the Nifisha terminal (30°34′N 32°15′E) connected to Agrud.

== Well statistics ==
Through 1928 there were drilled 93,000ft in total exploration wells, From 1929 until 1936 exploratory drilling virtually ceased. Revisions in mining regulations in 1937 stimulated efforts by AEO, Socony-Vacuum, Standard Oil of New Jersey and CalTex. During World War II, 116 wells totaling 272,053 feet were completed at Ras Gharib, but exploratory drilling was suspended with no new wells spudded after Gharib West No. 4 on November 5, 1940 until Ayun Musa No. 1 on December 23, 1944. With the exception of the force majeure due to the war there was a period of intensified exploration activity in Egypt from 1937 through to 1948.

Maps of wildcats: 1949

Wells completed
Year	Hurghada			Gharib			Sudr			Asl			Matarma			Wildcats		
	Oil	Dry	Feet	Oil	Dry	Feet	Oil	Dry	Feet	Oil	Dry	Feet	Oil	Dry	Feet	Oil	Dry	Feet
1938	many						none									1 (Note: Ras Gharib discovery 2,500ft on Apr 12 spudded Dec 1, 1937)	1 (Note: Dishet el Dhaba No. 2 (Socony) on Jul 9 spudded Feb 5)	4,495
1939	many						none									0	6 (Note: Anglo-Egyptian Oilfields; Gharib West No. 1 5,023ft on Aug 1 spudded Mar 13; Gharib West No. 2 4,100ft on Sep 14 spudded Jul 19; Socony; Giftun Saghir No. 1 3,103ft on May 28 spudded Dec 2, 1938; Sherm el Arab No. 1 1,892ft on Jun 23 spudded May 23; Abu Shaar West No. 1 2,866ft on Sep 13 spudded Jul 9; Abu Shaar South No. 1 2,833ft on Nov 4 spudded Sep 26)	19,817
1940	many						none									0	10 (Note: Anglo-Egyptian Oilfields; Gharib North No. 1 4,425ft on Jun 12 spudded Apr 5; Gharib West No. 3 4,000ft on Jun 24 spudded Apr 23; Shagar No. 1 SW of Gharib 4,265ft on Oct 4 spudded Aug 2; Socony; Wadi Dara No. 1 6,722ft on Apr 1 spudded Jul 21, 1939; Dishet el Dhaba No. 3 3,800ft on Feb 26 spudded Nov 21, 1939; Mareikha No. 1 3,025ft on Jun 3 spudded Mar 12; Shukheir No. 1 3,545ft on Sep 19 spudded May 2; Dishet el Dhaba No. 4 3,756ft on Nov 19 spudded Oct 1; Standard Oil of Egypt; Ras Ruahmi No. 1 8,282ft on May 21 spudded Jan 2 with rig#1; Bakr No. 1 3,880ft on Oct 10 spudded Jun 2 with rig#1)	45,700
1941	many						none									0	4 (Note: Anglo-Egyptian Oilfields; Gharib West No. 4 4,975ft on Jan 28, 1941 spudded Nov 5, 1940; Socony; Shukheir No. 2 4,823ft on Feb 9 spudded Dec 10, 1940; Shukheir No. 3 4,900ft on Apr 16 spudded Mar 6; Standard Oil of Egypt; Bakr No. 2 5,162ft on Jan 1 spudded Oct 23, 1940 with rig#1)	19,860
1942	many						none									none		
1943	many						none									none		
1944	0	3	8,424	19	0	44,650	none			none						0	3 (Note: Standard Oil of Egypt; Bakr No. 3 5,035ft on Mar 10 spudded Nov 28, 1943 with rig#1; Bakr No. 4 4,659ft on May 27 spudded Mar 28 with rig#1; Bakr No. 5 4,000ft on Jul 8 spudded Jun 19 with rig#1)	13,694
1945	none			12	0	28,620	none			none						0	4 (Note: Anglo-Egyptian Oilfields; Gharib North No. 2 6,474ft 10 miles NW of Gharib field in Nov 1945; Anglo-Egyptian+Socony; Ayun Musa No. 1 5,451ft 9 miles SE of Suez on Jul 29 1945 spudded Dec 23, 1944; Standard Oil of Egypt; Nakhl No. 1 5,566ft on Mar 24 spudded Nov 17, 1944 with rig#1; Darag No. 1 2,768ft on Jun 9 spudded Apr 24 with rig#1)	20,259
1946	none			6	0	15,355	none			none						1 (Note: Sudr No. 1 (AEO+Socony) 34 miles SE of Suez 3,157ft on May 24)	9 (Note: Anglo-Egyptian Oilfields; Myos Hormos No. 1 12 miles NW of Hurghada field 5,024ft on May 15; Myos Hormos No. 2 15 miles NW of Hurghada 5,800ft on Oct 15; Socony; Dishet El Dhaba No. 5 a few miles south of Hurghada 3,216ft on May 24 spudded Mar 2; Ras Bakr No. 1 Gulf of Suez 6,784ft on Nov 5 spudded Jul 5; Anglo-Egyptian+Socony; Ayun Musa No. 2 (AEO+Socony) 9 miles SE of Suez 5,808ft on Jan 20; Asl No. 1 (AEO+Socony) 40 miles SE of Suez 4,328ft on Jul 24; Standard Oil of Egypt; Abu Hamth No. 1 central Sinai 7,132ft on Feb 15 spudded Jul 11, 1945 with rig#1; Wadi Baba No. 1 Gulf of Suez 4,548ft on Sep 25 spudded May 16; Abu Roasch No. 1 western desert 6,289ft on Sep 30 spudded Jan 18 with the former caltex rig)	52,086
1947	none			6	0	15,933	3	0	21,388	none						0	6 (Note: Abu Sultan No. 1 (AEO) W Side Great Bitter Lake 2,456ft on Sep 6; Attaka No. 1 (AEO) 9 miles NW of SUez 3,938ft on Mar 15; Abu Rudeis No. 1 (SOofE) 19 miles S of Abu Zanima 7,895ft on Mar 28; Nebwi No. 1 (AEO+Socony) 47 miles S of Suez 8,360ft on Aug 30; Hamra No. 1 (???) 25 miles E of Suez 4,790ft on Jul 12; Abu Reash No. 2 (SOofE) 6 miles NW of Great Pyramids 5,610ft on Jan 31)	33,049
1948	1	2	10,091	3	0	10,090	6	2	21,291	none						2 (Note: Asl No. 2 (AEO+Socony) Sinai 3,910ft in February; 1,500bpd 22-gravity; Matarma No. 2 (AEO+Socony) Sinai 3,649ft in November; shut-in 18-gravity)	4 (Note: Matarma No. 1 (AEO+Socony) SInai 6,093 in August; Lagia No. 1 (SOofE) Sinai 3,995ft in February; Lagia No. 2 (SOofE) Sinai 8,382ft in November; Tawila No. 2 (SOofE) Sinai 11,375ft in May)	37,404
1949	0	4	14,721	1	0	?	1	2	15,859	4	2	26,581	1	2	12,669	some (Note: The Mines and Quarries law of 1948 made exploration economically prohibitive However 7 dry holes were drilled at Nebwi and 4 at Lagie.)		
1950	0	0	0	6	0	13,784	6	3	28,170	2	3	23,010	0	0	0	some		
1951	1	2	5,500	2	0	4,973	1	0	6,578	0	6	24,561	0	0	0	some		
1952				7	4	27,542										some		
1953	0	0	0	3	2	17,813	0									some		
1954	7 oil, 3 dry, 38,397ft																	
1955	10 oil, 3 dry, 29,600ft																	
1956	15 oil, 2 dry, 127,169ft																	
1957	13 oil, 7 dry, 141,553ft																	
1958	0						1	0	2,771	0								
1959	0	0	0	3	0	9,281	0											
1960	0	0	0	2	0	2,920	1	0	3,000	0								

== Production statistics ==
Oil production by field (tons)
Year	Gemsah	Hurghada
1911	1,220	0
1912	27,454	0
1913	12,586	0
1914	91,009	10,964

Oil production by field (barrels)
	Hurghada	Gharib
1937	(Note: converted by source from long tons using a factor of 6.98)1,141,356	
1938	(Note: Cumulative at end of 1938: 31,207,754bbl)1,019,520	512,988

Oil production by field (x 1000 barrels)
Year	Gemsah	Hurghada	Durba	Gharib	Sudr	Asl	Matarma
1910	12 (Note: Year of Discovery)						
1911	9						
1912	213						
1913	98						
1914	682	79					
1915	113	119					
1916	83	312					
1917	52	883					
1918	38	1,887					
1919	32	1,517					
1920	21	994					
1921	34	1,231					
1922	23	1,158	5				
1923	5	1,043	2				
1924	5	1,111	3				
1925	9	1,215	7				
1926	5	1,174	7				
1927	1	1,255	8				
1928		1,859	6				
1929		1,898	4				
1930		1,980	3				
1931		2,005	6				
1932		1,870	1				
1933		1,644	1				
1934		1,523	1				
1935		1,250	3				
1936		1,266					
1937		1,178	6				
1938		1,053	2	525			
1939		894	1	3,775			
1940		751	4	5,769			
1941		662	3	7,841			
1942	3	577	1	7,542			
1943		486	1	8,447			
1944		486	1	8,932			
1945		437	2	8.932			
1946	2	375		8,527			
1947		351		9,300	118		
1948		341		9,323	3,494		
1949		317		8,402	5,448	1,671	
1950	22	265		7,945	4,250	3,844	
1951		301		8,026	3,727	4,245	
1952		274		8,366	2,341	5,456	
1953		268		8,492	2,127	5,615	
1954		261		8,810	2,153	2,404	105
1955		250		8,392	2,189	1,147	127
1956	2	260		7,155	1,809	983	113
1957	13	211		7,692	2,035	1,089	100
1958		222		7,030	1.228	1,040	78
1959		226		6,441	1,103	1,046	98

== The Egyptian Oil Industry ==
=== Government ===
The Abu Durba field (28°38′N 33°20′E) was operated by the government.

=== South Mediterranean Oil Co ===
The South Mediterranean Oil Co, Ltd. was a joint-venture of Standard Oil of California and Texaco (see also: Caltex). The company began prospecting in Egypt in 1938. It had ca. 240 exploratory permits covering 5 million acres and was conducting field geology and geophysical exploration. Had (at least) one large rig and several smaller units. Drilled Khatatba No. 1 to 7,000 ft 25 miles northwest of Cairo and found nothing and shortly thereafter in May 1945 announced its withdrawal from Egypt. The assets were bought by AEO, Socony-Vacuum and Standard Oil Co of Egypt (subsidiary of Standard of NJ) in the fall of 1945.
