= Baba Gurgur =

Gas field fire

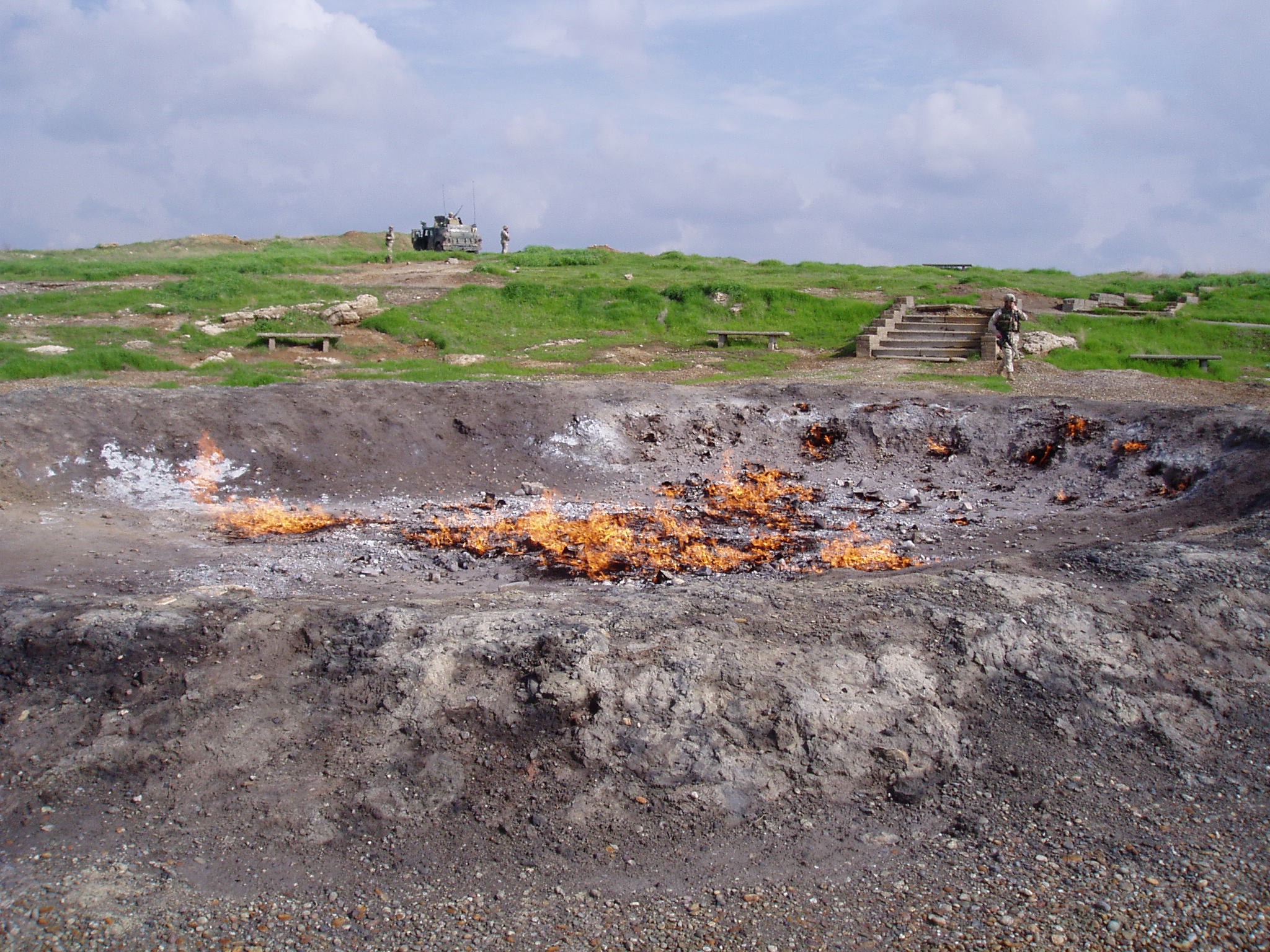
- The Eternal Fire at Baba Gurgur

- Location within Iraq
- Country: Iraq
- Coordinates: 35.5329°N 44.3357°E
- Operator: Iraq Petroleum Company

Field history
- Discovery: 1927

Baba Gurgur (Arabic: بابا كركر, Kurdish: بابە گوڕگوڕ, Babagurgur) is an oil field and gas flame near the city of Kirkuk, which was the first to be discovered in northern Iraq in 1927. It was considered the largest oil field in the world until the discovery of the Ghawar field in Saudi Arabia in 1948. Baba Gurgur is 16 kilometres north-west of Arrapḫa and is famous for its Eternal Fire (Arabic: النار الازلية) at the middle of its oil fields.

== Etymology ==
The name Baba Gurgur is derived from Bab or Baba (/bæbʌ/; a Kurdish/Indo-European word for "father") and Gur (/gʊr/; a Kurdish word for "fire; flame; haste"), 'father of fires', or 'the father of underground rumblings'.

== Culture ==
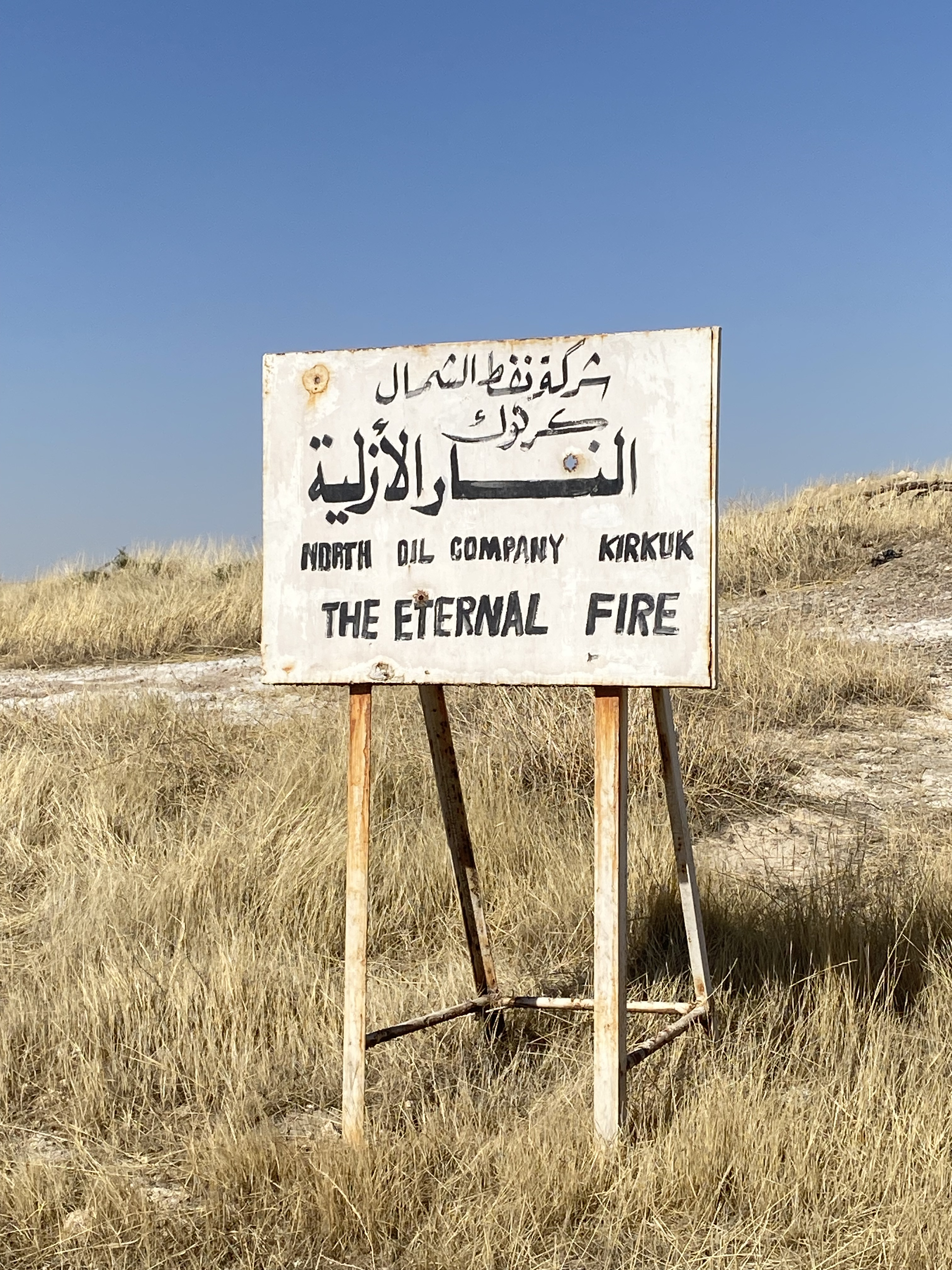
Baba Gurgur “THE ETERNAL FIRE” set by North Oil Company

Douglas Michael Morton cites the local belief that the Eternal Fire was the burning fiery furnace mentioned in Chapter 3 of the Book of Daniel, into which King Nebuchadnezzar cast three Jews. Morton further mentions that according to Plutarch, this is where Alexander the Great witnessed "fire issues in a continuous stream, like a spring of water, out of a cleft in the earth," and was used to illuminate the streets.

The site has a significant importance to Iraqi history, and religious ceremony, visited by women seeking blessing. Conversely, local shepherds used the nearby mud to protect their flocks. The burning flames are the result of an emission of natural gas through cracks in the Baba Gurgur area's rocks.

== History ==
Based on the recommendation of E. Wesley Shaw and Arthur Noble, Turkish Petroleum Company (TPC) geologists, four wells were drilled in northern Iraq. The objective was the "Main" limestone, equivalent Asmari Formation, below the Middle Miocene Middle Fars Formation. The first well was spudded on 5 April 1927 at Pulkhana, followed by those at Injana, Khasm al Ahmar, and finally Baba Gurgur on 30 June. On 23 September, TPC chief geologist Louis "Chick" Fowle noted the Baba Gurgur had already reached the "main" limestone at 1,521 feet (464 m). Since the well only had casing to 590 feet (180 m), he ordered drilling to be stopped, while casing was extended another 1,000 feet (300 m).

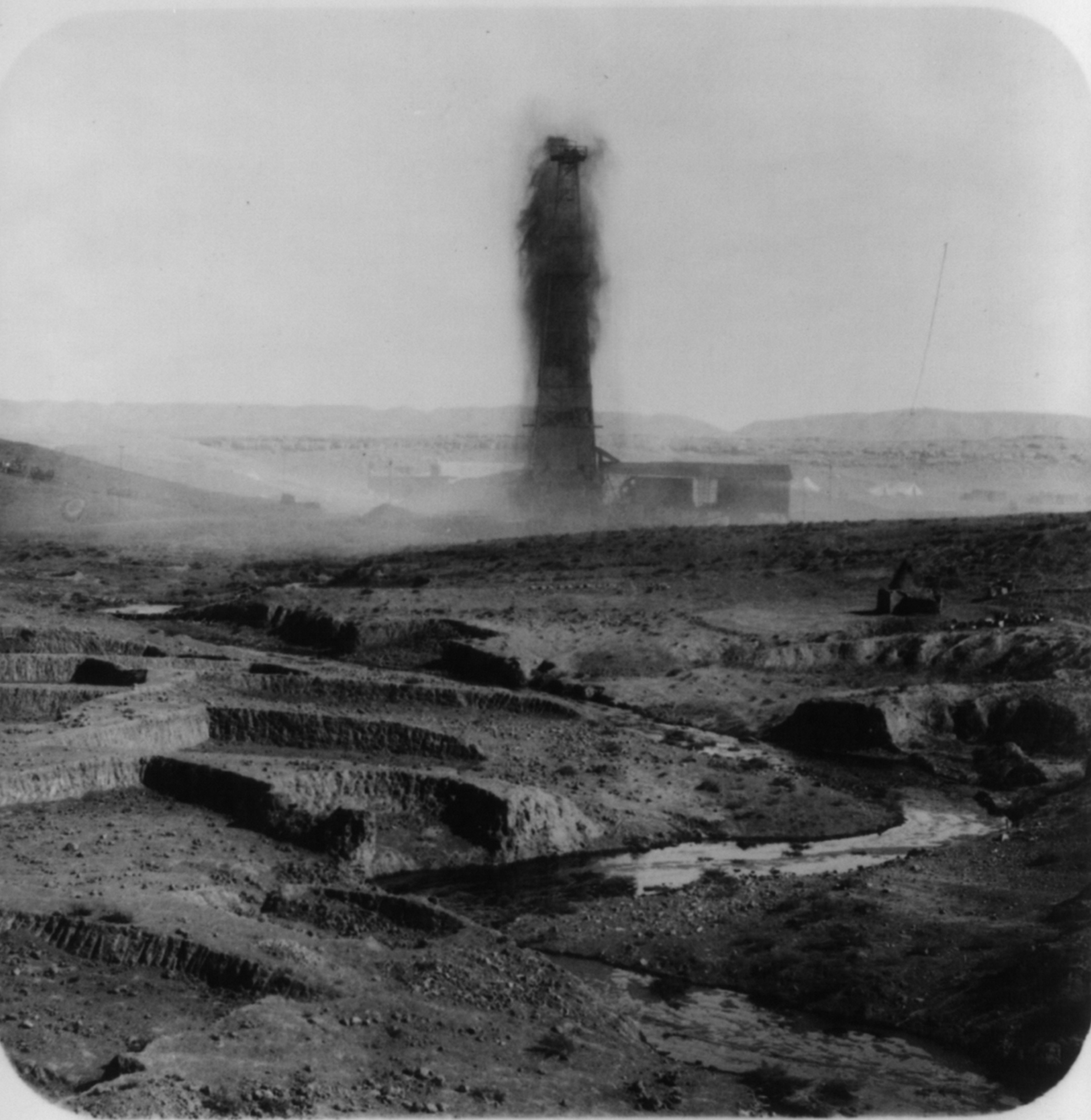
Kirkuk district, an oil gusher spouting

On 14 October, drilling resumed. At 3 a.m. on 15 October 1927, oil was struck and a great fountain spurted over the crown of the derrick to a height of 42 metres. The oil overflowed into the desert, threatening the nearby inhabitants, their property, and their water supply. Kirkuk and surrounding villages were in danger of drowning in a sea of oil, if the well could not be controlled. Earthen dams, 1.5 km apart, were needed in the wadi, and a depression 24 kilometres away, formed into a temporary catchment pond. Soon, an estimated 2,000 men from the Jubur tribe along the Zab River, and the Obaid tribe on the Hawija plain, were at work. Dangers persisted, as a blue mist of gas would form at night in shallow depressions, posing the risk of poisoning the workers, five of whom were killed. Additionally, the risk of fire was great. As the cloud of oil drifted away from the well site, work could commence on trying to close the control valve. After ten days of flow between 35,000 and 95,000 barrels of oil per day, the well was contained.

Iraq Petroleum Company replaced the TPC in October 1928, as development commenced to produce the Kirkuk Field. Supporting infrastructure included two pipelines to carry the oil to the Mediterranean coast, 100 wells, 12 pumping stations, oil terminals for ships, telegraph and telephone lines, air transport, rail transport, workshops and offices.

In 2018, it was alleged that oil from Kurdish controlled Baba Gurgur went to the Turkish town of Ceyhan, and from there was secretly shipped to Israel.

== See also ==
- Iraq Petroleum Company NOC – North Oil Company
- Darvaza gas crater – another natural perpetual flame in Turkmenistan
- Centralia mine fire
- New Straitsville mine fire
- Natural fueled eternal flames
