= Outline of Iraq =

Country in West Asia

The Flag of Iraq

The Coat of arms of Iraq

The location of Iraq

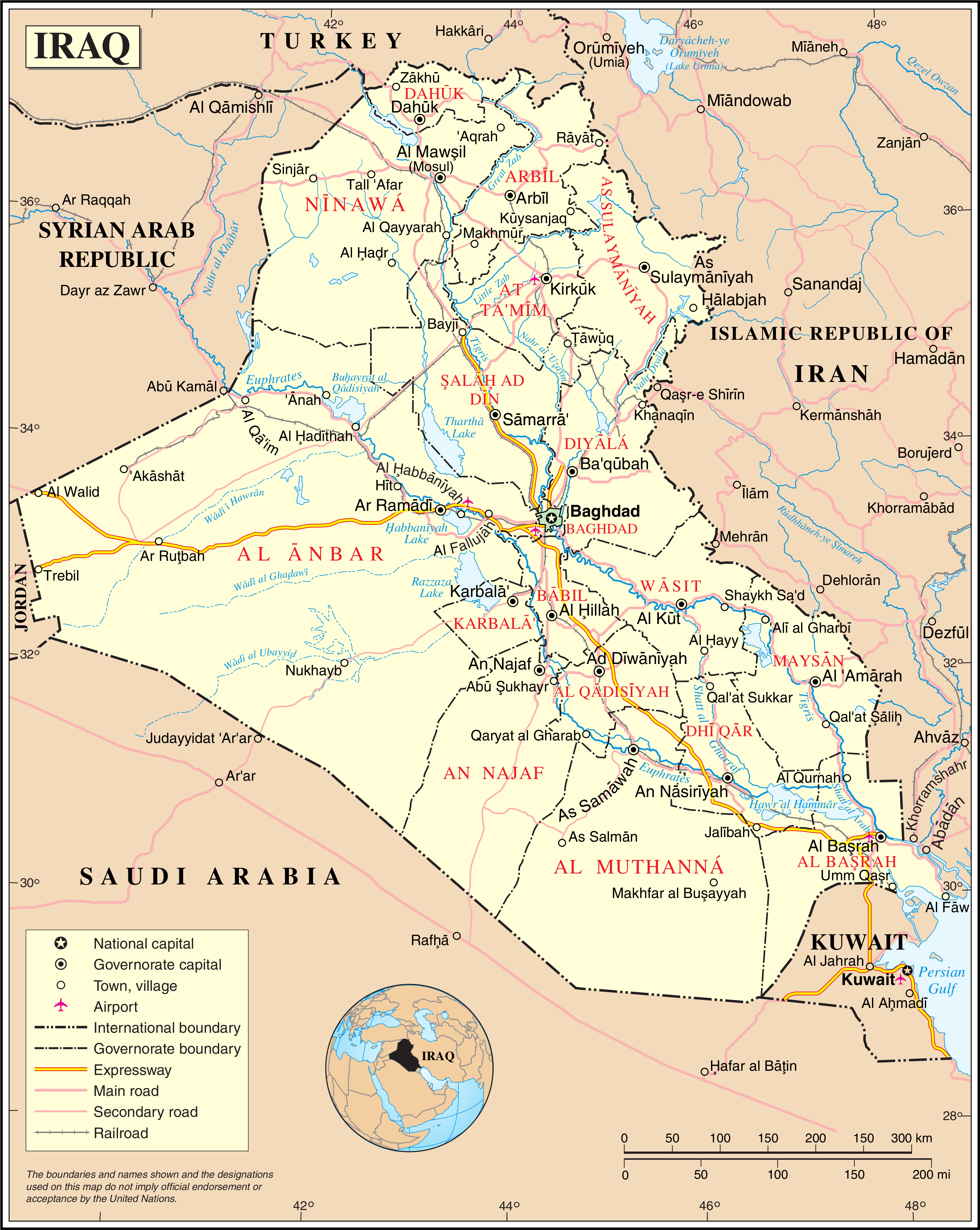
An enlargeable map of Iraq

The following outline is provided as an overview of and topical guide to Iraq:

Iraq – sovereign country located in West Asia. It spans most of the northwestern end of the Zagros mountain range, the eastern part of the Syrian Desert and the northern part of the Arabian Desert. It shares borders with Kuwait and Saudi Arabia to the south, Jordan to the west, Syria to the northwest, Turkey to the north, and Iran to the east. It has a very narrow section of coastline at Umm Qasr on the Persian Gulf. There are two major flowing rivers: the Tigris and the Euphrates. These provide Iraq with agriculturally capable land and contrast with the desert landscape that covers most of Western Asia.

== General reference ==
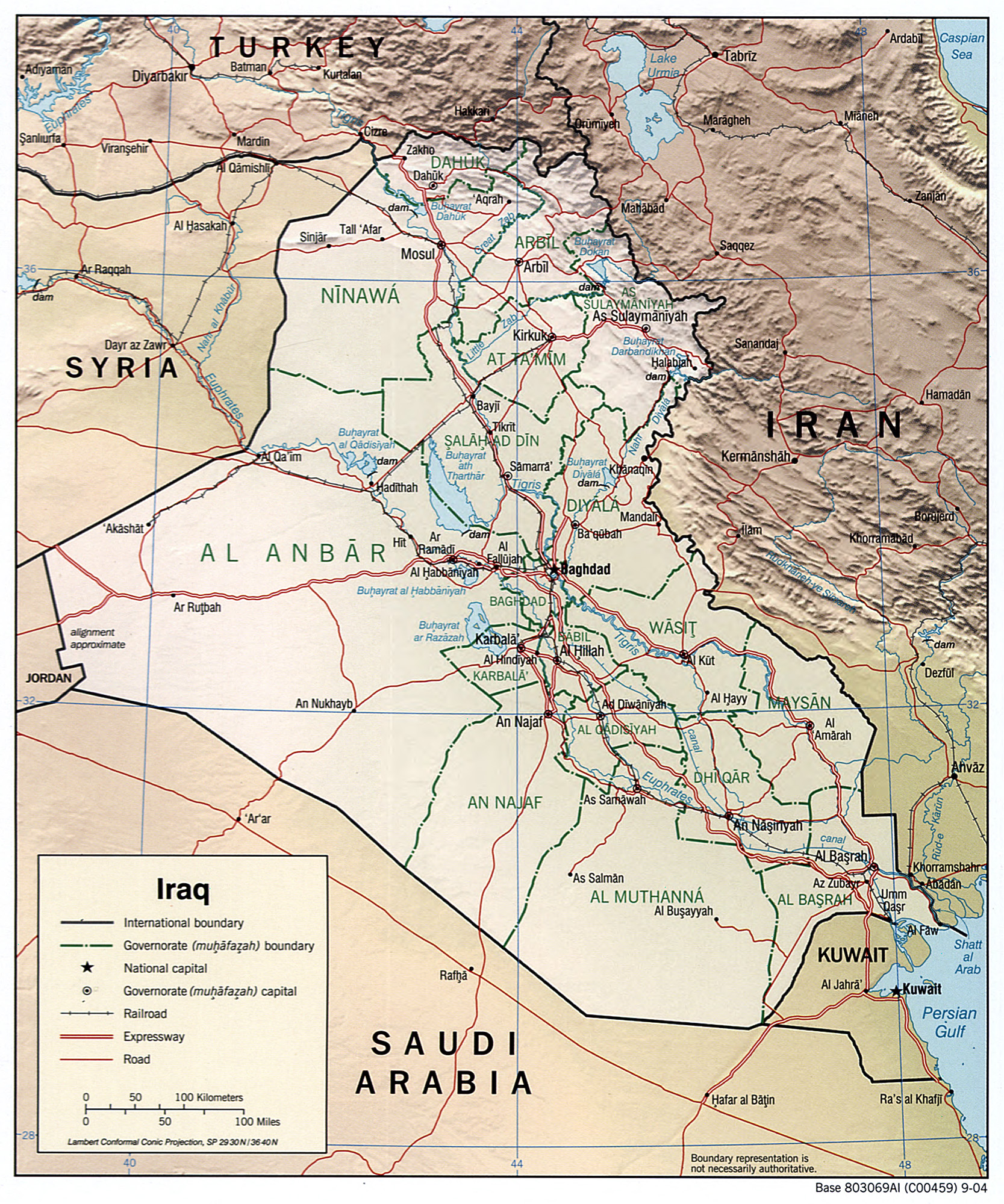
An enlargeable relief map of Iraq

- Pronunciation: ɪˈrɑːk
- Common English country name: Iraq
- Official English country name: The Republic of Iraq
- Common endonym(s): Iraq (العراق)
- Official endonym(s): Iraq
- Adjectival(s): Iraqi
- Demonym(s): Iraqi
- Etymology: Name of Iraq
  - 58th largest country
  - 36th most populous country
- ISO country codes: IQ, IRQ, 368
- ISO region codes: See ISO 3166-2:IQ
- Internet country code top-level domain: .iq

== Geography of Iraq ==
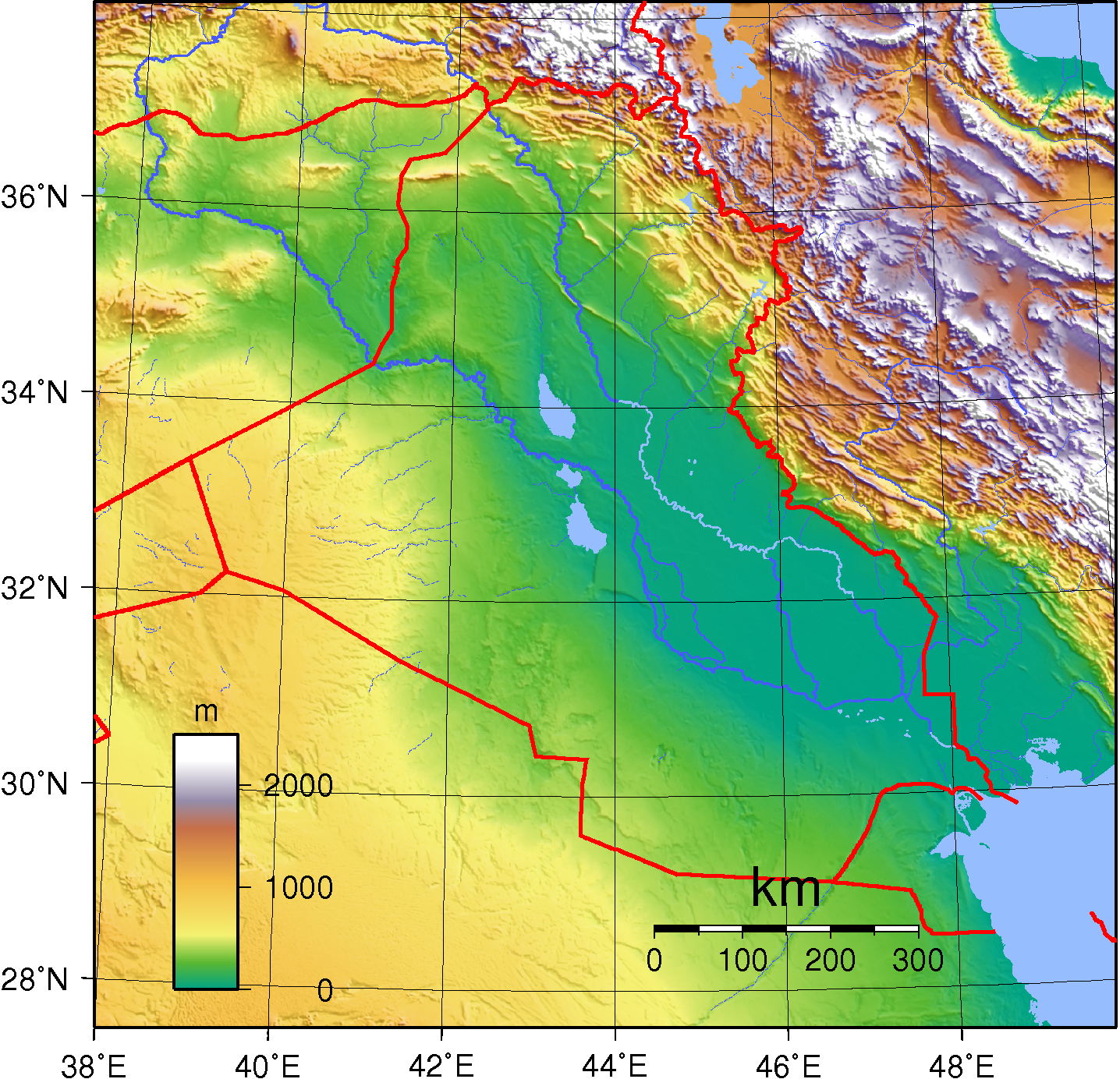
An enlargeable topographic map of Iraq

Geography of Iraq

- Iraq is a: Country
- Location:
  - Northern Hemisphere and Eastern Hemisphere
  - Eurasia
    - Asia
      - Western Asia
  - Fertile Crescent
    - Mesopotamia
  - Time zone: UTC+03
  - Extreme points of Iraq
    - High: Cheekha Dar 3,611 m (11,847 ft)
    - Low: Persian Gulf 0 m
  - Land boundaries: 3,650 km

Iran 1,458 km
Saudi Arabia 814 km
Syria 605 km
Turkey 352 km
Kuwait 240 km
Jordan 181 km

- Coastline: Persian Gulf 58 km

- Population of Iraq: 38,274,618 people (July 2017 estimate) – 36th most populous country
- Area of Iraq: 438,317 km^{2} (169,235 sq mi) – 58th largest country
- Atlas of Iraq

=== Environment of Iraq ===
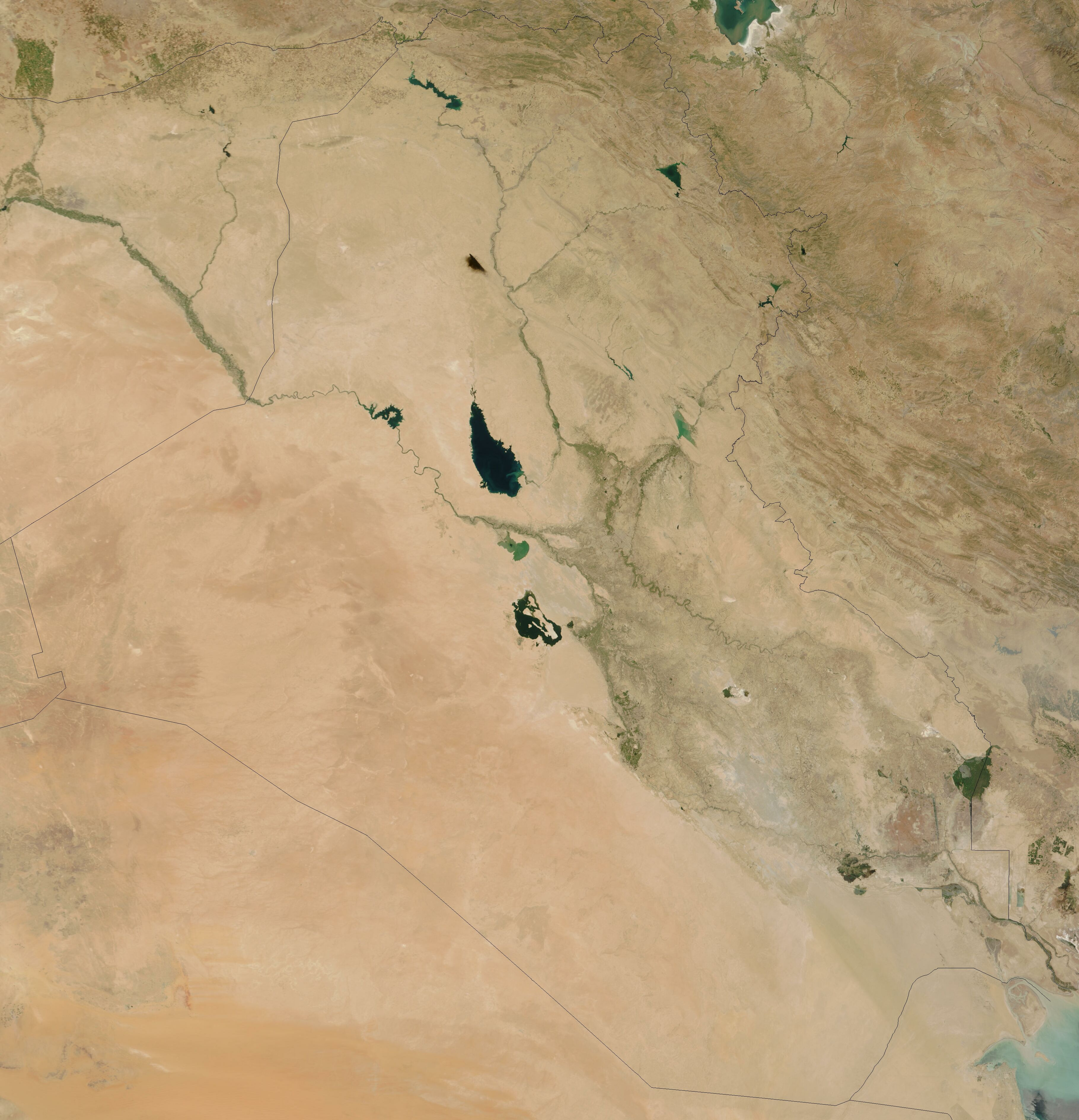
An enlargeable satellite image of Iraq

Environment of Iraq

- Climate of Iraq
- Environmental issues in Iraq
- Renewable energy in Iraq
- Geology of Iraq
- Protected areas of Iraq
  - Biosphere reserves in Iraq: None
  - National parks of Iraq
- Wildlife of Iraq
  - Fauna of Iraq
    - Birds of Iraq
    - Mammals of Iraq

==== Natural geographic features of Iraq ====
- Glaciers of Iraq: None
- Islands of Iraq
- Lakes of Iraq
- Mountains of Iraq
  - Volcanoes in Iraq
- Rivers of Iraq
  - Waterfalls of Iraq
- Valleys of Iraq
- World Heritage Sites in Iraq

=== Regions of Iraq ===
Regions of Iraq

==== Ecoregions of Iraq ====
Ecoregions of Iraq

==== Administrative divisions of Iraq ====
Administrative divisions of Iraq

- Regions of Iraq
  - Governorates of Iraq
    - Districts of Iraq
      - Municipalities of Iraq

===== Governorates of Iraq =====
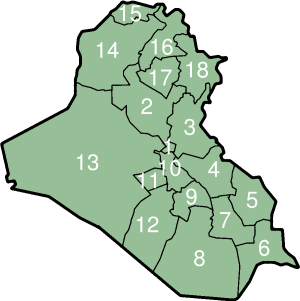
Governorates of Iraq

Governorates of Iraq

1. Baghdad Governorate – Arab, Turkman, Assyrian, Kurdish
2. Saladin Governorate – Arab, Turkman, Kurdish
3. Diyala Governorate – Arab, Turkman, Kurdish
4. Wasit Governorate – Arab, Turkman
5. Maysan Governorate – Arab
6. Basra Governorate – Arab
7. Dhi Qar Governorate – Arab
8. Muthanna Governorate – Arab
9. Al Qadisyah Governorate – Arab
10. Babil Governorate – Arab, Turkman
11. Karbala Governorate – Arab
12. Najaf Governorate – Arab
13. Al Anbar Governorate – Arab
14. Nineveh Governorate – Arab, Turkman, Assyrian, Kurdish
15. Dahuk Governorate – Assyrian, Kurdish, Arab
16. Erbil Governorate – Turkman, Kurdish, Assyrian, Arab
17. Kirkuk Governorate – Turkman, Kurdish, Arab, Assyrian
18. As Sulaymaniyah – Kurdish, Assyrian

The constitutionally recognized Kurdistan Autonomous Region includes parts of a number of northern provinces, and is largely self-governing in internal affairs.

===== Districts of Iraq =====
Districts of Iraq

===== Municipalities of Iraq =====
Municipalities of Iraq

- Cities of Iraq
  - Capital of Iraq: Baghdad

=== Demography of Iraq ===
Demographics of Iraq

== Government and politics of Iraq ==
Politics of Iraq

- Occupation of Iraq 2003–2011
- Federal government of Iraq
- Capital of Iraq: Baghdad
- Elections in Iraq
- Political parties in Iraq
- Reconstruction of Iraq

=== Branches of government ===
==== Executive branch ====
- Head of state: President of Iraq
- Head of government: Prime Minister of Iraq
- Council of Ministers of Iraq

==== Legislative branch ====
- Council of Representatives of Iraq (unicameral parliament)

==== Judicial branch ====
Judiciary of Iraq

- Supreme Judicial Council of Iraq
- Court of Cassation of Iraq
- Supreme Court of Iraq
- Central Criminal Court of Iraq

=== Foreign relations of Iraq ===
Foreign relations of Iraq

- Diplomatic missions in Iraq
- Diplomatic missions of Iraq
- Iraqi diaspora

==== International organization membership ====
International organization membership of Iraq The Republic of Iraq is a member of:

- Arab Bank for Economic Development in Africa (ABEDA)
- Arab Fund for Economic and Social Development (AFESD) (suspended)
- Arab Monetary Fund (AMF)
- Council of Arab Economic Unity (CAEU)
- Food and Agriculture Organization (FAO)
- Group of 77 (G77)
- International Atomic Energy Agency (IAEA)
- International Bank for Reconstruction and Development (IBRD)
- International Civil Aviation Organization (ICAO)
- International Criminal Police Organization (Interpol)
- International Development Association (IDA)
- International Federation of Red Cross and Red Crescent Societies (IFRCS)
- International Finance Corporation (IFC)
- International Fund for Agricultural Development (IFAD)
- International Labour Organization (ILO)
- International Maritime Organization (IMO)
- International Mobile Satellite Organization (IMSO)
- International Monetary Fund (IMF)
- International Olympic Committee (IOC)
- International Organization for Standardization (ISO)
- International Red Cross and Red Crescent Movement (ICRM)
- International Telecommunication Union (ITU)
- International Telecommunications Satellite Organization (ITSO)
- Islamic Development Bank (IDB)
- League of Arab States (LAS)
- Multilateral Investment Guarantee Agency (MIGA)
- Nonaligned Movement (NAM)
- Organisation of Islamic Cooperation (OIC)
- Organization of Arab Petroleum Exporting Countries (OAPEC)
- Organization of Petroleum Exporting Countries (OPEC)
- Permanent Court of Arbitration (PCA)
- United Nations (UN)
- United Nations Conference on Trade and Development (UNCTAD)
- United Nations Educational, Scientific, and Cultural Organization (UNESCO)
- United Nations Industrial Development Organization (UNIDO)
- Universal Postal Union (UPU)
- World Customs Organization (WCO)
- World Federation of Trade Unions (WFTU)
- World Health Organization (WHO)
- World Intellectual Property Organization (WIPO)
- World Meteorological Organization (WMO)
- World Tourism Organization (UNWTO)
- World Trade Organization (WTO) (observer)

=== Law and order in Iraq ===
Law of Iraq

- Capital punishment in Iraq
- Constitution of Iraq
- Crime in Iraq
- Human rights in Iraq
  - LGBT rights in Iraq
  - Freedom of religion in Iraq
- Law enforcement in Iraq
  - Iraqi Police

=== Military of Iraq ===
Military of Iraq

- Command
  - Commander-in-chief:
    - Ministry of Defence of Iraq
- Forces
  - Army of Iraq
  - Navy of Iraq
  - Air Force of Iraq
  - Air Defence of Iraq
  - Special Operations Forces of Iraq
- Military history of Iraq
- Military ranks of Iraq

=== Local government in Iraq ===
Local government in Iraq

== History of Iraq ==
History of Iraq

- Timeline of Iraq
- Current events of Iraq
- List of years in Iraq
- List of years in the Kingdom of Iraq
- Military history of Iraq
  - Iraq and weapons of mass destruction
  - Iraq War
    - Occupation of Iraq (2003–2011)
    - 2003 invasion of Iraq
    - Casualties of the Iraq War
    - Iraqi insurgency
    - Rationale for the Iraq War
    - Terrorist attacks of the Iraq War
    - Timeline of the Iraq War

== Culture of Iraq ==
Culture of Iraq

- Architecture of Iraq
- Cuisine of Iraq
- Festivals in Iraq
- Languages of Iraq
- Media in Iraq
- National symbols of Iraq
  - Coat of arms of Iraq
  - Flag of Iraq
  - National anthem of Iraq
- People of Iraq
  - Ethnic minorities in Iraq
- Prostitution in Iraq
- Public holidays in Iraq
- Records of Iraq
- Religion in Iraq
  - Christianity in Iraq
  - Hinduism in Iraq
  - Islam in Iraq
  - Judaism in Iraq
  - Sikhism in Iraq
- World Heritage Sites in Iraq

=== Art in Iraq ===
- Art in Iraq
- Cinema of Iraq
- Literature of Iraq
- Music of Iraq
- Television in Iraq
- Theatre in Iraq

=== Sport in Iraq ===
Sport in Iraq

- Most popular sport: Football (soccer)
  - Iraq Football Association
    - Iraq national football team
    - Iraq Super League
    - List of football stadiums in Iraq

== Economy and infrastructure of Iraq ==
- Economic rank, by nominal GDP (2017): 54th (Fifty-Fourth)
- Agriculture in Iraq
- Banking in Iraq
  - Central Bank of Iraq
- Communications in Iraq
  - Internet in Iraq
  - Television in Iraq
- Companies of Iraq
- Currency of Iraq: Dinar
  - ISO 4217: IQD
- Energy in Iraq
  - Energy policy of Iraq
  - Oil industry in Iraq
- Health care in Iraq
- Mining in Iraq
- Iraq Stock Exchange
- Tourism in Iraq
- Transport in Iraq
  - Airports in Iraq
  - Ports of Iraq
  - Rail transport in Iraq
  - Roads in Iraq
- Water supply and sanitation in Iraq

== Education in Iraq ==
Education in Iraq

== Health in Iraq ==
Health in Iraq

- Deafness in Iraq

== See also ==
Iraq

- List of international rankings
- Member states of the United Nations
- Outline of Asia
- Outline of geography
