= Iraq (disambiguation) =

EARUQKED

Iraq (العراق) is a country in Western Asia, largely corresponding with the territory of ancient Mesopotamia.

Iraq may also refer to:

== Places ==
- Lower Mesopotamia, a region historically known as al-'Irāq al-'Arabi
- Upper Mesopotamia, northern part of the region between Tigris and Euphrates
- Iraq, an alternate name of Arak, Iran, a city in Markazi Province, Iran
- Iraq, an alternate name of Iraj, Isfahan, a village in Isfahan Province, Iran
- Persian Iraq, an obsolete term for a large region in western Iran (used in 11th–16th centuries)
- Iraq al Amir, a town in Jordan
- Iraq al-Manshiyya, a Palestinian Arab town in Gaza City
- Iraq Suwaydan, a Palestinian Arab village in Gaza City
- Iraq, Ludhiana, a village in the Punjab state of India

== Other ==
- Iraq, a journal from the British Institute for the Study of Iraq
- "Iraq", a song by Iraqi-American rapper Timz
- "Iraq", a song by American band Flobots from the UK edition of Fight with Tools
- Delford "Iraq" Wade, a character in the 2014 video game Watch Dogs

== See also ==
- Iraqi (disambiguation)
- IRAC
- Interleukin-1 receptor associated kinase (IRAK)
