= Energy in the Middle East =

Energy in the Middle East describes energy and electricity production, consumption, import, natural gas, ecological concerns and climate change in the Middle East.

== Fossil fuels ==
=== Oil ===
As of 2009. the largest share of global oil production was located in the Middle East. A share which produces 24 million barrels daily, making up 31 percent of global production. According to Transparency International and based on BP data, regionally the largest share of proved oil reserves is in the Middle East. The total is estimated to be 754 billion barrels, constituting 51 percent of global reserves, including oil sands, and 57 percent while excluding oil sands. According to BP, the global oil reserves were found primarily Saudi Arabia with 18% of the world's oil reserves, Iran having 9%, Iraq with 8%, Kuwait at 7% and UAE possessing 7%.

In June 2015, Jim Hollis, CEO of NEOS, during “Oil and Gas: Governance and Integration” forum, stated that Lebanon’s potential offshore natural gas reserves are estimated at 25 trillion cubic feet, according to initial estimates carried out in the country's exclusive economic zone.

It was estimated in 2009 that the total proven oil reserves present within the MENA region amounted to 813.8 billion barrels of oil equivalent (BBOE). The nations with the largest volumes of BBOE are Saudi Arabia which possesses 264.2 BBOE, Iran holding 138.4 BBOE, and Iraq with 101.5 BBOE.

=== Natural gas ===
Countries within the MENA region currently hold about 40 percent of the world's natural gas reserves. As of 2022, both Iran and Qatar hold the highest amount of proven natural gas reserves with 32.1 trillion cubic meters and 24.7 trillion cubic meters respectively.

==== Natural gas in Iran ====
Iran's first ventures into natural gas began in the 1930's when the chairman of the Anglo-Persian Oil Company, John Cadman, turned down the Iranian government's proposals to start natural gas extraction due to the time and resources he believed would be required. In the early 1940's, American engineering company Morrison-Knudsen provided enough recommendations for a convincing plan to be formed and presented to the Anglo-Persian Oil Company, now renamed The British Petroleum Company, which would one day become B.P. p.l.c, commonly known as B.P.

Despite holding 15.8% of the world's total natural gas, Iran exports just 1% of the world's natural gas due to sanctions and global relations. Although Iran does not export a significant amount of natural gas worldwide, Iran has used natural gas to support domestic industrialization since the 1960's.

==== Natural gas in Qatar ====
Qatar, opposite Iran, is one of the largest exporters of liquefied natural gas in the entire world. Formerly holding the title of largest global exporter, Qatar plans to increase their natural gas production by 85%, or up to 142 million metric tons per annum by the year 2030. Equipment and facilities are already in place as of 2025 to help propel Qatar past the United States and Australia in an effort to reclaim their status as the world's largest gas exporter.

==== Natural gas in Israel ====
In 2019, Israel's EU Ambassador, Oded Eran, publicly discussed the possibility of an underwater natural gas pipeline in the Mediterranean sea between Israel and Turkey in Cyprus. However, the pipeline project has not yet reached a stage that will allow construction to begin. Complications such as a construction cost estimated to be at 6.5 billion euros and the perceived possibility of Russian interference in the natural gas market were cited as reasons for the delay.

== Energy export ==
Energy export from the Middle East in 2010
#		TWh	%
1	Saudi Arabia	4,551	37.2%
2	Qatar	1,748	14.3%
3	Iran	1,574	12.9%
4	Kuwait	1,159	9.5%
5	United Arab Emirates	1,129	9.2%
6	Iraq	1,017	8.3%
7	Oman	617	5.0%
8	Egypt	164	1.3%
9	Yemen	139	1.1%
10	Bahrain	79	0.6%
11	Syria	51	0.4%
Total: Middle East		12,228	100%

The total energy export from the Middle East in 2010 was 12,228 TWh. The region's three largest exporters were Saudi Arabia 37.2%, Qatar 14.3% and Iran 12.9%.

== Ecological concerns and climate change ==
As of 2024, international researchers are studying the environmental damage done by oil and natural gas explorations and extractions, both of which heavily impact marine wildlife and fishing.

As seafood has been a staple of Middle Eastern diet for many years, researchers are concerned that the methods in which natural gas is acquired has broad and far reaching effects on local marine biology. Studies note how the operations of oil rigs may disrupt the ecological cycles of marine wildlife. The direct present of the oil rig itself presents a challenge for marine animals who may be forced into relocating elsewhere. The powerful sonic vibrations of the drilling can kill fish and destroy marine habitats. Contaminated water from the drilling also is no longer viable for usage by any biological life.

According to a study on nanoecotoxicology, there are three main routes that the oil extraction process affects marine wildlife. The first is noise emission, which has been shown to cause fish distress. The second is the dumping of contaminated water from the operations which has become unusable, and lastly, ordinary environmental pollution caused by the flames of the energy extraction process.

=== Carbon dioxide emission ===
Several Middle Eastern countries are among the world's top carbon dioxide emitters per capita. The top 10 countries emitting the most in annual tonnes per capita (t/capita) in 2009 were; Gibraltar, releasing 52 t/capita of CO₂, the Virgin Islands, the United States with 114 t/capita, Qatar emitting 80 t/capita, Netherlands Antilles at 51 t/capita, Bahrain releasing 43 t/capita, United Arab Emirates emitting 40 t/capita, Trinidad and Tobago at 39 t/capita, Singapore with 34 t/capita and finally, Kuwait emitting 32 annual tonnes per capita of carbon dioxide. All emissions from building and cement production are local but some people may argue that some United Arab Emirates produced fuels and/or goods are consumed abroad. One of the biggest sources of emissions in the Middle East is air conditioning, a virtual necessity in the region's often torrid climate. Per capita use of air conditioning in the Middle East is currently far lower than in the United States, but is expected to increase.

=== Transparency ===
Researchers note that governments within the MENA region tend to have poorer regulation regarding environmental statistics transparency when compared to other global regions, though this varies by country.

== Business ==
The Middle East's energy sector is dominated by major national oil and gas companies, including Saudi Aramco, QatarEnergy, Kuwait Petroleum Corporation KPC and National Iranian Oil Company (NIOC) in Iran. Other major players include ADNOC in the United Arab Emirates, OQ in Oman, Bapco Energies in Bahrain, the Egyptian General Petroleum Corporation (EGPC) in Egypt, and Iraq's State Oil Marketing Organization (SOMO). The UAE also has Emirates National Oil Company (ENOC), while Israel's Eastern Mediterranean gas sector includes NewMed Energy and Chevron. Together, these companies cover much of the region's oil and gas production, LNG, refining, petrochemicals, trading and energy infrastructure.

== Arab region ==
The Arab region which includes Algeria, Bahrain, Egypt, Iraq, Jordan, Kuwait, Lebanon, Libya, Mauretania, Morocco, Oman, Palestine, Saudi Arabia, Qatar, Sudan, Syria, Tunisia, the United Arab Emirates, and Yemen, hold approximately 60% of the world's oil reserves, and 30% of the world's gas reserves. The Arab region is highly dependable on the energy sector because it is the basis of its recent development. The energy sector represents approximately 40% of the Arab region's GDP. However, due to rapid increase in population, industrial and agricultural development, electricity consumption has increased dramatically in the region. In fact, the region's electricity consumption growth rate was registered at 7.9% per year in 2010 while the region's cumulative GDP growth rate at 3.9% during the same year.

The Arab region is facing a huge influx of energy demand coming from rapidly growing energy intensive urban industrial cities. A significant portion of the energy demand is due to water desalination plants. The interrelationship of exerting energy to produce water and vice versa is a concept known as Energy-Water-Nexus. These rapidly growing cities are experiencing world's fastest rates of energy consumption per capita, which also means enormous amount of water consumption as well. If this demand was not mitigated, it will drastically decrease the exported energy from the Arab region because most of it will have to be used within the region to meet its own demand. Consequently, economic instability will arise due to enormous lost in revenue.
