= IRAC (disambiguation) =

IRAC stands for Issue, Rule, Application, and Conclusion, a methodology for legal analysis.

IRAC may also refer to:

- Infrared Array Camera, an instrument aboard the Spitzer Space Telescope
- Insecticide Resistance Action Committee, an industrial alliance against insecticide resistance
- Israel Religious Action Center, a division of the Israel Movement for Progressive Judaism
- Island Regulatory and Appeals Commission, the independent tribunal and regulating arm of the Government of Prince Edward Island
- Interdepartment Radio Advisory Committee; see Bandwidth allocation § Office of Spectrum Management (OSM)

== See also ==
- Iraq (disambiguation)
