= Fatha =

Fatha may refer to

- Earl "Fatha" Hines, American jazz pianist and bandleader
- Fatha, Iraq, area and geological formation
- Fatḥah, Arabic diacritic
- ـَ' (fatha), Arabic Braille
