= 1932 in the Kingdom of Iraq =

- Decades: 1910s; 1920s; 1930s; 1940s; 1950s
- See also: Other events of 1932; List of years in Iraq

Events in the year 1932 in the Kingdom of Iraq.

== Incumbents ==
- Faisal I of Iraq, King, 23 August 1921-8 September 1933
- Naji Shawkat, Prime Minister, 3 November 1932–20 March 1933
- Menahem Saleh Daniel, Senator, 1925-1932

== Events ==
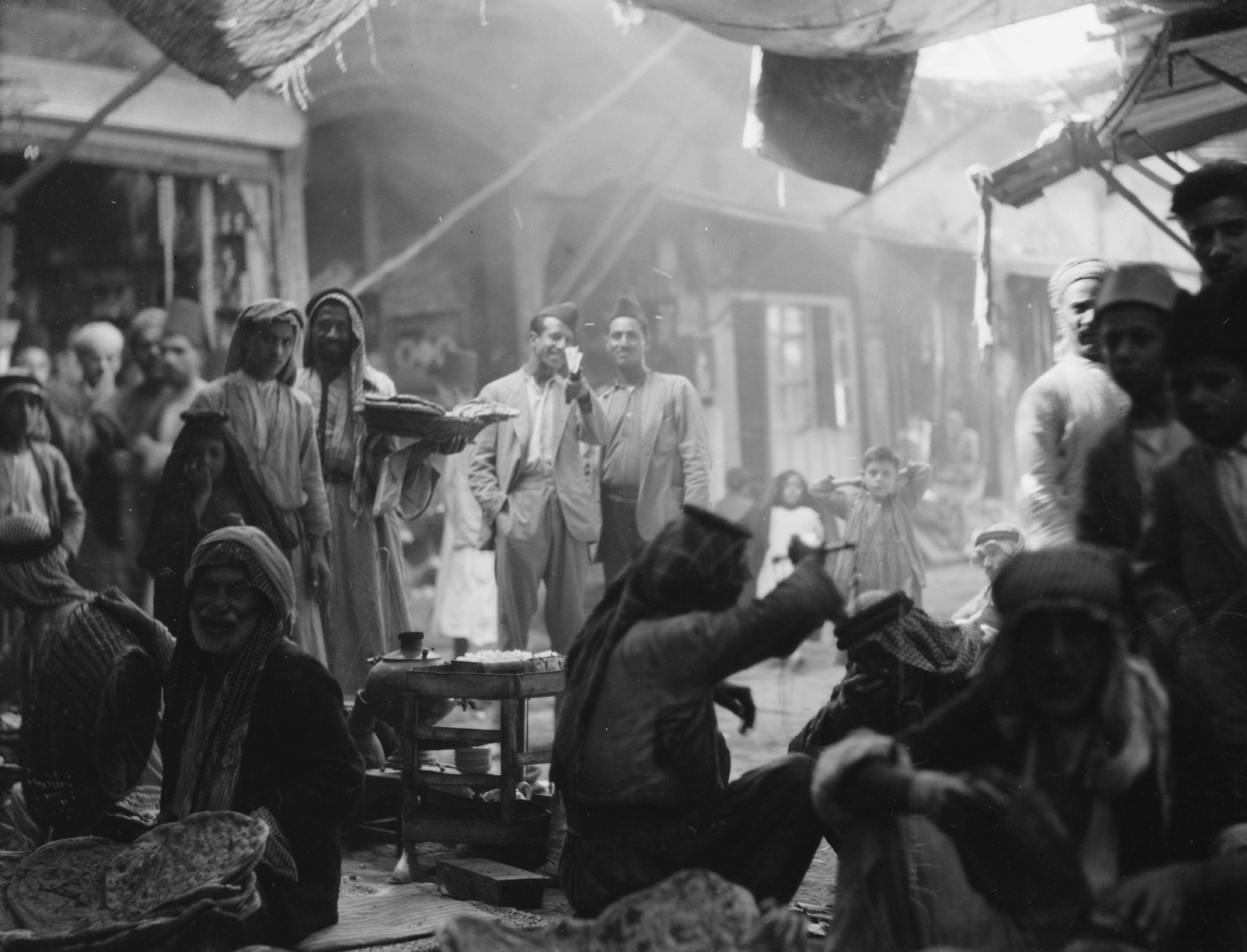
Iraqi market in Mosul, 1932

- Iraq received its independence on 3 October, ending the British Mandate which began in 1920
- Iraq joined the League of Nations on 6 October
- The Ahmed-Mustafa Barzani revolts, which began in 1931, were suppressed
- The government stopped issuing Indian Rupees and started issuing Iraqi dinars
- Iraqi Red Crescent Society was founded in Baghdad
- Al Shorta SC, multi-sport club based in Rusafa District, was established on 14 November

== Births ==
- Shahab Sheikh Nuri, politician and grandson of Mahmud Barzanji, born in Sulaymaniyah
- Nuzhat Katzav, author and Israeli politician, member of the Knesset, born 1 April in Baghdad (died 2022).
- Tahir Allauddin Al-Qadri Al-Gillani, head of the Sufi Qadiriyya Baghdadia Spiritual Tariqa, born on 18 June in Baghdad
- Bahija Ahmed Shihab, Iraqi sociologist and one of the pioneering women that helped establish the Sociology department at the College of Arts, University of Baghdad, born on 1 July in Baghdad
- Abdul Jerri, Iraqi-American mathematician
- Shmuel Moreh, born in Baghdad on 22 Decemberprofessor emeritus in the Department for Arabic Language and Literature at the Hebrew University and a recipient of the Israel Prize in Middle Eastern studies in 1999.

== Deaths ==
- Faisal I of Iraq, King, on 8 September 1933
- Sassoon Eskell, the Kingdom's first Finance Minister
