= Fatha, Iraq =

Area and geological feature of Iraq

Lake Tharthar
- Location of Tharthar lake
- Location: Al Anbar Province
- Coordinates: 33°58′N 43°11′E
- Surface elevation: 3 metres (9.8 ft)

Fatha is an area of Iraq between Kirkuk and Baiji.

The Fatha formation is a geological features of Iraq. They appeared in the Middle Miocene. Lake Tharthar developed from the Tharthar depression mainly by karstification, due to dissolving of gypsum rocks of the Fatha formation. The rocks of the Miocene Fars (Fatha) Formation were used to construct the Mosul Dam. It leaked.

In 2013 the area experienced a terrorist incident when bombs attacked a section of a pipeline from Kirkuk to Ceyhan in Turkey.
