= Climate change in Iraq =

Emissions, impacts and responses of Iraq related to climate change

Geography of Iraq
- Continent: Asia
- Region: Middle East
- Coordinates: 33 00 N, 44 00 E
- Area: Ranked 58
  - Total: 438,317 km^{2} (169,235 sq mi)
- Coastline: 58 km (36 mi)
- Borders: Turkey to the north, Iran to the east, the Persian Gulf and Kuwait to the southeast, Saudi Arabia to the south, Jordan to the southwest, and Syria to the west.
- Highest point: Cheekha Dar; 3,611 m (11,847 ft)
- Lowest point: Persian Gulf; 0 m (0.0 ft)
- Longest river: Euphrates
- Largest lake: Lake Tharthar
- Natural resources: Petroleum, sulfur, phosphate, and natural gas.

In Iraq, climate change has led to environmental impacts such as increasing temperatures, decreasing precipitation, land degradation, and water scarcity. Climate change poses numerous risks to human health, livelihoods, political stability, and the sustainable development of the nation. The combination of ecological factors, conflict, weak governance, and an impeded capacity to mitigate climate change, has made Iraq uniquely at risk to the negative effects of climate change, with the UN ranking them the 5th most vulnerable country to climate change. Rising temperatures, intensified droughts, declining precipitation, desertification, salinization, and the increasing prevalence of dust storms are challenges Iraq faces due in to the negative impacts of climate change. National and regional political instability and conflict have made it difficult to mitigate the effects of climate change, address transnational water management, and develop sustainably in Iraq. Climate change has negatively impacted Iraq's population through loss of economic opportunity, food insecurity, water scarcity, and displacement.

Water-related challenges are at the forefront of Iraq's environmental problems. Models predict that precipitation will decrease by 9% and mean annual temperatures will increase by 2 °C by 2050. The flow of the Tigris and Euphrates rivers, which provide 98% of Iraq's surface water, has decreased by 30-40% in the past 40 years. The water resources of these two rivers are also shared with neighboring countries. Iraq's water supplies have significantly decreased over time due to dam construction from upstream nations.

In 2019 Iraq contributed 0.5% to global carbon emissions. Iraq's energy sector and fugitive emissions account for three-fourths of the nation's emissions. Specifically, Iraq's oil and gas sectors produced 9% of global methane emissions in 2019, a portion of which is from gas flares. The waste, industrial, and agriculture sectors are the other sectors contributing to Iraq's greenhouse gas emissions.

Iraq produced an Intended Nationally Determined Contribution (INDC), which is a set of policies and goals for how Iraq can address climate change. Iraq wants to reduce emissions by 15% by 2035, with a specific focus on lowering their methane emissions. Iraq ratified the Paris Treaty in 2021 and committed to specific actions to reduce methane emissions in the oil and gas sector, which are coordinated by a newly established inter-ministerial national task force on methane emissions.

== Impacts on the natural environment ==
Iraq is ecologically vulnerable to climate change due to a variety of interconnected reasons. Iraq is in a dry region of the world and it can be divided into three areas: the arid deserts of the south, the semi-arid alluvial plains, and the mountainous northern region. Along with its arid land, Iraq has faced political turmoil, poor management of scarce resources, and the degradation of key ecosystems.

=== Temperature and weather changes ===
Köppen climate classification map for Iraq for 1980–2016

2071–2100 map under the most intense climate change scenario. Mid-range scenarios are currently considered more likely

Heat waves and the average temperature have been increasing rapidly in Iraq. The mean temperature of Iraq has increased at a rate of 0.7 degrees Celsius per century. These rising global temperatures have intensified water scarcity and desertification in Iraq. The average weather conditions of Iraq consist of a wet and dry season. However, climate change intensifies these seasons, which leads to extreme drought and flooding events. The southern and central regions of Iraq show display patterns of decreased precipitation. The changes in temperature and precipitation have led to an increase in dust and sand storms throughout Iraq. Desertification, or the degradation of biologically productive land into infertile desert, is increasing in Iraq. A study monitoring the spatial land patterns of Iraq found that from 1990 to 2014, the desert area increased by 5%. As of 2022, 39% of Iraq's land was affected by desertification.

=== Water resources ===
The Tigris-Euphrates River System and its given watershed account for 98% of surface water in Iraq, integral to the diverse ecosystem. The total catchment area (the area in which rainfall flows into bodies of water) is estimated to have a size of 430,000 Square Kilometers (km²), about 46% of the whole country. Iraq's waterbodies and river basins are uniquely vulnerable to the impacts of Climate Change in the 21st century, through global warming, declining precipitation rates, altered distribution patterns, salinity, and evaporation. Iraq is facing acute water stress. With the decrease in precipitation rates, models have predicted that the available water will decrease while the demand for crop water increases. Due to a combination of factors, the most of important of which is increasing temperatures, water flow will decrease in Iraq by 25 to 50%. The significant drops in annual rainfall will not only affect water levels and flow but will have detrimental impacts on agriculture and human health.

As water levels fall, increasing salinity of the water supply has become a concern in southern Iraq, especially in Basra.

==== Extreme weather events ====
Climate change has intensified extreme weather events, particularly droughts and floods. Decreased rainfall and increasing temperatures are the main drivers of drought. Iraq's drought problem has only deepened, with 2018 and 2021 being the first and second driest recorded years, respectively.

==== Mesopotamian Marshes ====
The Mesopotamian Marshes in southern Iraq, an ecosystem important to animals and humans alike, has deteriorated due to anthropogenic factors and climate change. After the draining of the marshes, the marsh ecosystem has become much more susceptible to impacts such as water shortages, heat waves, and drought. Sea level rise and water salinization combined with long dry periods have deteriorated the marshes. As of 2023, the Center for Restoration of Iraqi Marshes and Wetlands at the Ministry for Water Resources estimates that 70% of the marshes are devoid of water.

== Impacts on people ==
Climate change has led to numerous negative impacts on the people of Iraq, including health issues, displacement from land, economic struggles, and resource scarcity. Rising temperatures, changes in patterns of precipitation, land degradation, and drought have negatively impacted agriculture, leading to lower yields and loss of arable land. These impacts cause agriculture-reliant rural populations to move to urban centers because of decreasing natural resources and economic opportunities. Agricultural impacts also threaten the food security of Iraq. Water scarcity and pollution have led to waterborne illnesses and improper sanitation.

Additionally, the relationship between climate change and regional conflict dynamics in Iraq negatively impacts livelihoods. The combination of weak governance, scarce natural resources, and conflict poses unique challenges to the livelihoods of the Iraqi people; for instance, resource scarcity that leads to in-community tension or weak governance leading to mismanagement of water.

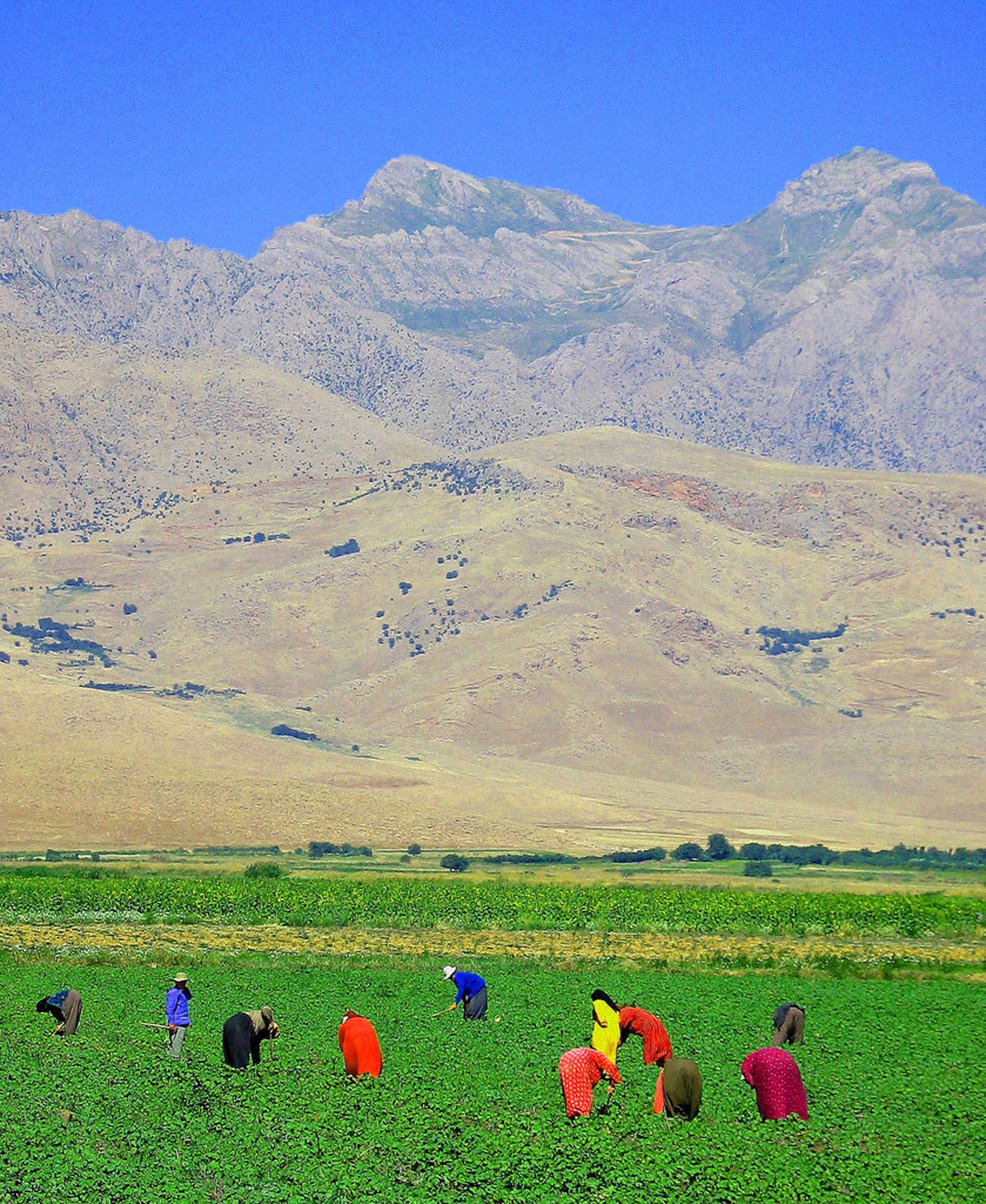
Iraqi Kurdish villagers in field near Turkish border

=== Economic impacts ===
Iraq's economy is extremely dependent on oil, which makes the nation more at risk to market volatility. Iraq's agricultural sector accounts for approximately 5% of the nation's GDP and is the source of livelihood for about 25% of the population. Iraq's largest food-producing industries, agriculture, livestock husbandry, and fishing, have all been negatively affected by the effects of climate change. With reduced precipitation and scarce water, desertification, and soil degradation, both livelihoods and food security are put at risk.

=== Internally displaced people ===
Climate change both negatively impacts and contributes to Iraq's large population of internally displaced people. In 2022, Iraq experienced the worst drought in 40 years which led to the internal displacement of 69,000 people. Research has found the strongest predictors for the risk of climate change-related displacement are: water-related issues, food security, lack of infrastructure and services, and reliance on land for their livelihood. Drought and desertification in rural areas, which leads to loss of livelihood and crop failure, has caused internal displacement and increased rural to urban migration.

=== Health impacts ===
Climate change-related hazards and risks cause several negative human health impacts. Rising temperatures have led to more cases of heat stroke. Reduced water quality and quantity increases the incidence of water-borne illnesses such as cholera. In 2021 Unicef estimated that 3 out of 5 children in Iraq do not have access to safe drinking water. In 2018. in Iraq's Basra Province, 118,000 individuals were hospitalized due to contaminated water. Dust and sand storms, which are projected to increase, cause respiratory infections, asthma, and other long-term health issues. Agriculture is impeded by the combined effects of climate change, which puts food security at risk. The presence of extreme weather events such as flooding and storms has led to displacement, injury, and death.

== Historical and political factors ==
Iraq's arid land is ecologically more likely to face the negative impacts of climate change; however, a history of war, political instability, and mismanagement of natural resources are also responsible for intensifying the adverse effects of climate change. The Gulf War (1990-1991) and the Iraq War (2003-2011) are two periods that highlight how socio-political factors drove how term climate change impacts. With the US-led invasion of Iraq and the subsequent mass displacement of up to 9.2 million Iraqis, 4.7 million people were food insecure. As of 2017, 3.2 million still need assistance with food.

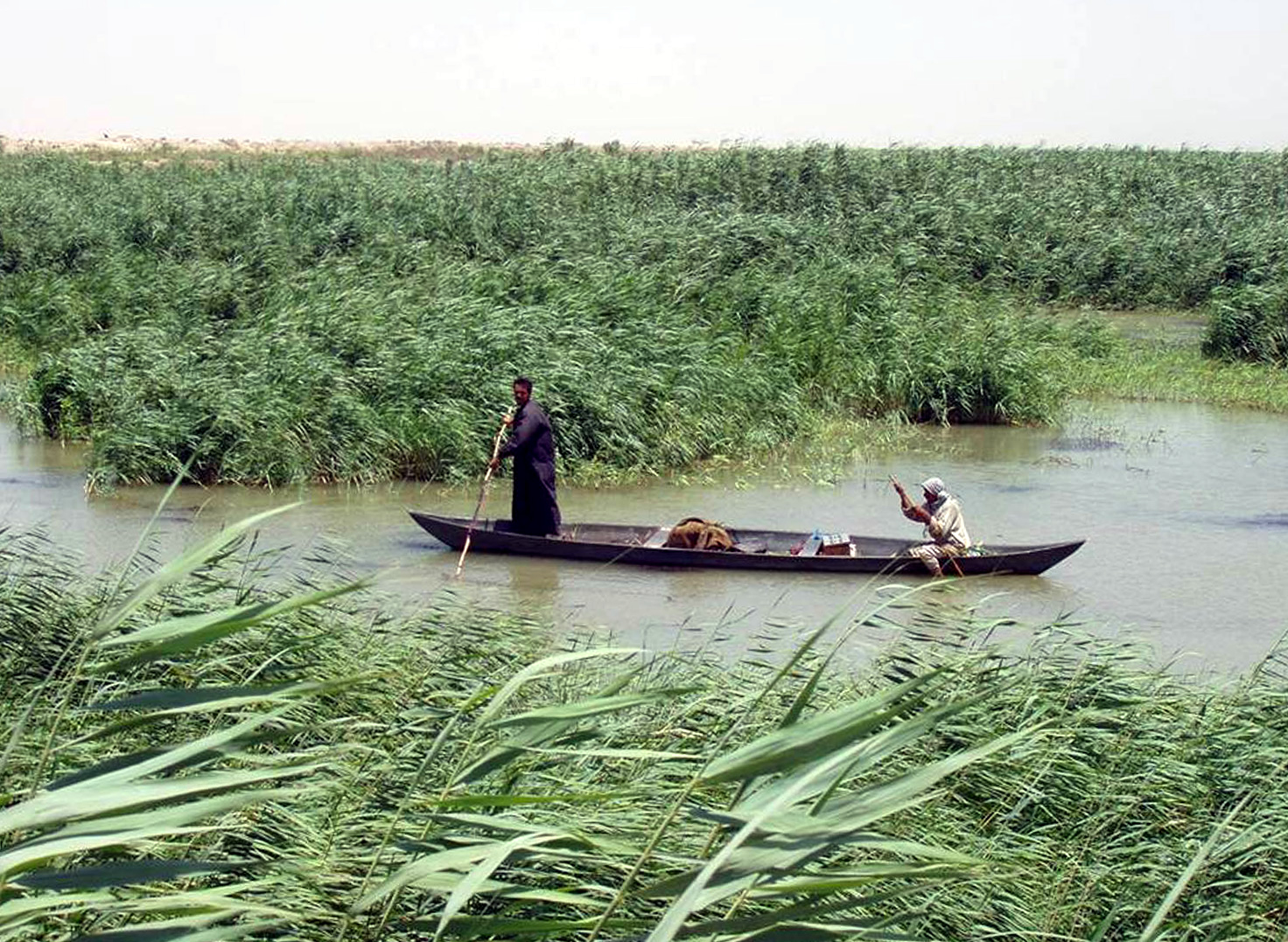
Marsh Arabs in a mashoof

=== Saddam Hussein ===
In 1992, during the Gulf War, Saddam Hussein ordered the draining of the Mesopotamian Marshes of southern Iraq to punish the Marsh Arabs for revolting during the 1991 Iraqi uprising against his government. Over 90% of the marshes was lost during Hussein's rule, which has intensified the effects of climate change. The draining led to the internal displacement of over 200,000 Ma'dan (Marsh Arabs) over the 1990s. The Marsh Arabs endured a government-backed campaign of violence which countries such as the United States have deemed to be an act of ecocide or ethnic cleansing.

== Society and culture ==
=== Activism ===
Due to the fragility of Iraq's government body, NGOs and civil society could play a huge role in fighting climate change in Iraq. In reality, climate activism is only just getting off the ground in recent years. During Saddam Hussein's regime, activism and governmental accountability was completely stifled. In 2010, the Iraqi government established the Civil Society Organization Law, a framework to register as a civil society organization. By 2023, about 6,000 to 12,000 non-governmental organizations were established, 185 of which are environmental. Notable recent and current activism efforts include- Save Basra campaign against water pollution in 2018, Nature Iraq, Save the Tigris, and the Tishereen Movement. In the 21st century, from Human Rights Watch reports, environmental activists have been abducted, detained and prosecuted. Demonstrations and clashes over water rights have also occurred in southern Iraq.

=== Controversies ===
Controversies surrounding climate change in Iraq include the 2018 Save Basra protests in response to the ongoing water crisis and pollution. Three civilian protesters were killed, and forty-seven were injured, according to the Human Rights Watch organization. Quoting the Human Rights Watch, "the interior ministry force used excessive and unnecessary force" in response to the climate protesters. Other controversies include the Marsh Arab Displacement (1970s to 2000s). In July 2022, electricity blackouts were exacerbated by militant attacks on powerlines, combined with a reduction in power supplied by Iran. Protests were held in Baghdad and Sadr City, where residents were left without air conditioning in 50 °C heat.

=== International collaboration ===
USAID, a United States governmental agency investing in foreign development, has put in 150 million dollars to improve water quality, access and handling. The United Nations, alongside the government of Iraq, the United States and international donors created the Funding Facility for Stabilization (FFS) with over 1.4 billion dollars allocated for restoring essential services.

=== Arts and media ===
Media plays a huge role in the dissemination of information throughout Iraq, expanding the conversation worldwide. Outlets such as Al-Jazeera English have published documentary films on the ongoing water crisis, as well as peace building series: Climate Change in Iraq, which aims to engage with youth.

== Mitigation and adaptation ==
=== Mitigation ===
Many international organizations are developing mitigation approaches for localized and statewide use. Economic and political reform will in turn help developing strategies to fight climate change. There is increasing initiatives on regional dialogue on climate change, and these initiatives are particularly prominent in the largest cities such as Baghdad.

Mitigation strategies involve reducing methane, which is seen by many groups, scientists, and activists as one of the most cost-effective and simplest ways to reduce climate change. As Iraq contributes heavily to methane emissions due to gas and oil production, the Iraqi government has aims to reduce the greenhouse gas emission by 15% by 2030.

=== Adaptation ===
To increase climate resilience in Iraq many initiatives, including the National Adaptation Plan (NAP), in the last decade. A three-year initiative to bolster technological, institutional and financial capabilities in order to guarantee future adaptation strategies are incorporated into the countries development. Agriculture and climate resilience projects have become significant, with international funding and backing in projects working towards addressing the crisis facing farmers across Iraq. Most of these projects are implemented through international collaboration and funding by international donors: The Swedish Government has promised over 10 million to build climate resilient agriculture strategies.

== See also ==
- History of Iraq
- Geography of Iraq
- Energy in Iraq
