= List of years in the Kingdom of Iraq =

This is a list of years in Hashemite Kingdom of Iraq.

1950s
1950
1951
1952
1953
1954
1955
1956
1957
1958

1940s
1940
1941
1942
1943
1944
1945
1946
1947
1948
1949

1930s
1932
1933
1934
1935
1936
1937
1938
1939

== See also ==
- List of years in Iraq
- List of years by country
- Timeline of Baghdad
- Timeline of Basra
- Timeline of Mosul
