= Abdul Jerri =

Iraqi mathematician

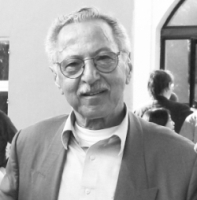
Abdul Jerri

Abdul Jabbar Hassoon Jerri (Arabic: عبد الجبار حسون جري) is an Iraqi American mathematician, most recognized for his contributions to Shannon Sampling Theory, Its Generalizations, Error Analysis, and Historical Reviews, and in particular his establishment in 2002 of the journal Sampling Theory in Signal and Image Processing (STSIP-ISSN 1530-6429) with over thirty top international experts as its editors, besides establishing its Sampling Publishing, also his contribution to the general understanding of the Gibbs Phenomenon, where he wrote the first book ever on the subject, published by Springer - Verlag, then he followed it by editing another book on Advances in Gibbs Phenomenon published by Sampling Publishing.

== Academic life ==
Jerri earned a B.Sc. in physics with honors at the University of Baghdad (1955) and M.S. in physics from Illinois Institute of Technology (1960) in Chicago where he continued to work within the research group (1960–63) in Reactor Physics and Radiation streaming in Shelter Entrance ways. He also earned a Ph.D. in mathematics from Oregon State University in 1967 with the dissertation title On Extensions of the Generalized Sampling Theorem.

Jerri commenced his tenure with the faculty of the Department of Mathematics and Computer Science at Clarkson University in Potsdam, NY (1967), where he worked from 1967 until his retirement as professor emeritus in 2002.

Jerri's career includes visiting positions at the American University in Cairo, where he established the Study Programs in Mathematics and Computer Science (1972–74). He was also the Director of the Graduate Mathematics Study Program at Kuwait University (1978–80).

=== Awards ===
Jerri is a double-awarded Fulbright Scholar at the Sultan Qaboos University in Muscat, Oman(1997), and a second time, at the Yarmouk University in Irbid, Jordan (2001). He is the Founding Executive Editor of Sampling Theory In Signal And Image Processing (STSIP) - An International Journal., and the owner of Sampling Publishing. In 1995, Jerri was one of the few researchers who helped establish the SAMPTA (Sampling Theory and Applications) Workshops, that holds a workshop in different country every two years (Starting in Latvia in 1995, then Portugal, Norway, the US, Austria, Turkey, Greece, France, Singapore, Germany, the US, and Estonia in 2017.)

=== Research ===
He is the author of several other popular books: Introduction to Integral Equations with Applications, accompanied by a Students Solution Manual: Sampling Publishing, Introduction to Wavelets accompanied by a Students Solution Manual( The latter Manual was co-authored with Prof Masaru Kamada); Sampling Publishing. Other books include Integral and Discrete Transforms with Applications and Error Analysis: Marcel Dekker, and Linear Difference Equations with Discrete Transform Methods:Sp ringer-Verlag.

He had published over forty papers, with numerous lectures on his areas of research interest nationally and internationally. Jerri's main research interests include the areas of Integral and Discrete Transforms, Sampling Expansion and its Applications, History and Error Analysis, the Gibbs Phenomenon, Transform-Iterative Methods for Nonlinear Problems, and Operational Sum Methods for Difference Equations.

In his first workshop, he introduced the subject of Shannon Sampling Theory in four-one hour lectures. In 1997 workshop in Aveiro, Portugal, the Proceedings of the workshop was dedicated to jerri 65th birthday. Presently, he is working on writing a Tutorial review paper on the subject "Multidimensional sampling in Signal Processing. He is dedicating this paper for the occasion of the CENTENNIAL of the American Scientist of the century, the father of Information Theory, Claude Elwood Shannon.
