= HIV/AIDS in Iraq =

Officially the AIDS-HIV pandemic came to Iraq via contaminated blood in 1986, with haemophiliacs being the primary victims. Over the decades, educational and treatment initiatives have been slowed by prevailing cultural values as well as severe economic hardships brought about by sanctions and war.

== 1986–2003 ==
According to the Iraqi government, and a subsequent lawsuit, the pandemic came to Iraq via contaminated blood in 1986, with haemophiliacs being the initial victims. The Ba'athists relocated Iraqis found to be infected with AIDS-HIV to a segregated medical facility. No one was allowed to visit these facilities, patients were basically prisoners and were given secret burials. Ignorance about the disease was commonplace, even among the government itself.

The former Iraqi President, Saddam Hussein, wrongly believed that the disease could be spread through casual contact and felt that infected Iraqis should be exterminated or imprisoned. When the regime fell, these segregated hospitals were looted and the surviving patients were left to wander the streets.

== Post-Ba'athist ==
As early as 2004 the United Nations IRIN news service reported on the challenges involved in AIDS-HIV treatment and education in Iraq. Almost no education existed regarding AIDS-HIV during the Ba'athist regime and thus a high degree of ignorance and fear surrounds the pandemic and its victims.

The Iraqi government offers free medical services and financial assistance to all Iraqi citizens living with AIDS-HIV. This includes regular checkups for the infected person, along with checkups for their partners and family members. Public service announcements and some education in the schools have begun at a slow pace.

Government health officials have some reason to be concerned, as some Muslim fundamentalist and sectarian militias have been known to harass and even kill infected Iraqis on the grounds that being infected with AIDS-HIV is evidence of sin.

In Baghdad several clinics specialize in AIDS-HIV, while outside of the capital, there are similar clinics in each region, although there are still shortages in medical care.

In 2005 representatives from the Iraqi Health Ministry traveled to Jordan to speak with public health officials about Jordanian efforts to stop the spread of the pandemic.

In 2006 the government in northern Iraq, Kurdistan, began to deport foreigners found to be HIV-positive because the government does not have the resources of facilities to offer treatment to its own citizens, let alone foreigners.

Ignorance about the pandemic remains widespread and it is taboo to discuss the ways in which the virus can be spread or to encourage the usage of condoms.
