= National symbols of Iraq =

The national symbols of Iraq are official and unofficial flags, icons or cultural expressions that are emblematic, representative or otherwise characteristic of Iraq and of its culture.

== Symbol ==
Title	Name of Symbol	Picture
National flag	Flag of Iraq	
Coat of arms	Coat of arms of Iraq	
National anthem	Mawtini	Mawtini
National flower	Rose	
National tree	Date palm	
National bird	Chukar partridge	
National animal	Wild goat	
