= Iraq, Ludhiana =

Iraq
- village
- Location in Punjab, India Iraq (India)
- Coordinates: 30.905097°N 76.146044°E
- Country: India
- State: Punjab
- District: Ludhiana
- Block: Machhiwara

Population (2011)
  - Total: approximately 800

Languages
  - Official: Punjabi, Hindi
- Time zone: UTC+5:30 (IST)
- PIN: 141115

Iraq is a village in the Ludhiana district of Punjab, India. It is located in the Machhiwara block, around 30 km from the Ludhiana city.

== History ==
The village gets its name from "Irakh", the Arabic word for a wild bull breed. The animal was used by the Muslim villagers to cross a seasonal stream on the outskirts of the village. Over time, the pronunciation of the village's name gradually changed to "Iraq". The Muslim villagers migrated to Sialkot after the partition of India in 1947.

== Demographics ==
As of 2014, the village has around 800 inhabitants. Most of the villagers work as farmers or as workers in the spinning mills located around the Machiwara-Ludhiana Road.
