= Bahija Ahmed Shihab =

Iraqi sociologist

- Born: Bahija Ahmed Shihab; 1 July 1932; Baghdad, Iraq
- Died: 7 August 2012 (aged 80); Seattle, Washington, United States
- Education: University of Baghdad, University of California, Los Angeles
- Scientific career
- Fields: Sociology, Social Work
- Workplaces: University of Baghdad

Bahija Ahmed Shihab (Arabic: بهيجة احمد شهاب; 1932–2012) was an Iraqi sociologist and one of the pioneering women that helped establish the Sociology department at the College of Arts, University of Baghdad, Iraq in the 1950s.

Shihab was specialized in Social Work and Community Organization and Development. She has authored several important books, articles, and studies and taught undergraduate and graduate courses at the department and supervised countless Ph.D. dissertations. Professor Shihab persistently promoted social justice causes especially relating to the emancipation of women in Iraq and the Arab world. Prof. Shihab continued to teach at the University of Baghdad until the Summer of 2007 which is when she and her family had to leave Iraq due to the deteriorating general security situation in Baghdad and assassinations targeting Iraqi secularists and academics. Professor Shihab was a believer in field work and bottom-up understanding of social issues. She held many positions including associate dean and department chair.

== Selected works ==
- Introduction to Social Work (1982, university textbook, in Arabic) المدخل الى الخدمة الإجتماعية
- Fields of Social Work (1982, in Arabic) ميادين الخدمة الإجتماعية
- Social Work (1990, co-authored with Dr. Ehsan al-Hasan, in Arabic) خدمة الجماعة
