= Energy in Iraq =

Total energy supply 2021
1. Oil (61.9%)
2. Natural gas (35.5%)
3. Hydro (0.92%)
4. Biofuels and waste (0.12%)
5. Wind, solar, etc. (0.01%)

Energy in Iraq plays a crucial role in both the national economy and the global energy markets due to the country's vast oil reserves and significant status within the Organization of the Petroleum Exporting Countries (OPEC).

Iraq holds abundant oil and gas resources and has strong solar PV potential. Its production to 2030 is set to be the third largest contributor to global oil supply. By the same year, the government expects that renewable capacity will amount for 5% of the country's total system capacity. These developments highlight Iraq's efforts to diversify its energy sources and enhance its energy security, while still significantly contributing to the global oil market.

== Overview ==
Energy in Iraq
| | Population (million) | Prim. energy (TWh) | Production (TWh) | Export (TWh) | Electricity (TWh) | CO_{2}-emission (Mt) |
|---|---|---|---|---|---|---|
| 2004 | 25.4 | 346 | 1,203 | 851 | 31.6 | 81.2 |
| 2007 | 27.5 | 385 | 1,219 | 824 | 32.3 | 91.5 |
| 2008 | 28.2 | 395 | 1,369 | 966 | 35.8 | 97.4 |
| 2009 | 29.0 | 374 | 1,391 | 1,009 | 33.2 | 98.8 |
| 2010 | 32.32 | 440 | 1,466 | 1,017 | 37.9 | 104.5 |
| 2012 | 32.96 | 468 | 1,652 | 1,172 | 42.6 | 108.3 |
| 2012R | 32.58 | 524 | 1,804 | 1,275 | 48.3 | 119.0 |
| 2013 | 33.42 | 582 | 1,833 | 1,249 | 60.7 | 137.9 |
| Change 2004–2010 | 27% | 27% | 22% | 20% | 20% | 29% |
Mtoe (million tonnes of oil equivalent) = 11.63 TWh (terawatt-hours). Primary energy includes energy losses. 2012R: CO2 calculation criteria changed; numbers updated.

== Oil production ==
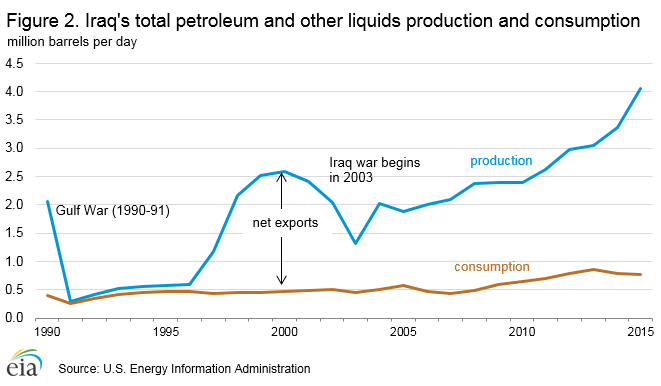
Iraqi oil production has surged after years of disorder.

In 2008, Iraq was the 9th highest crude oil exporter with 88 Mt. In 2023, Iraq exported an average of 3,466,750/barrel/day, and in early 2024 was estimated to be the 5th largest oil exporter in the world.

Iraq's economy is very oil-dependent and from 2012-2022 oil revenues accounted for more than 99% of Iraq's exports, 85% of the government's budget, and 42% of Iraq's GDP. Iraq's oil reserves were the third biggest in the world, after Saudi Arabia and Iran. In 2009 the Iraq government set a target to increase oil production from 2.5 million barrels (400,000 m^{3}) to 7 million barrels per day (1,100,000 m^{3}/d) in six years. In June 2009 oil production rights in the Rumaila oil field were sold to BP and China National Petroleum for 20 years contracts. Investments are estimated as $10–20 billion. Field reserves are 16.998 billion barrels (2.7025×10^{9} m^{3}). In October 2009 Rumaila's capacity was 1.1 million barrels per day (170,000 m^{3}/d). Iraq's total oil production was 2.4 Mbbl/d (380,000 m^{3}/d).

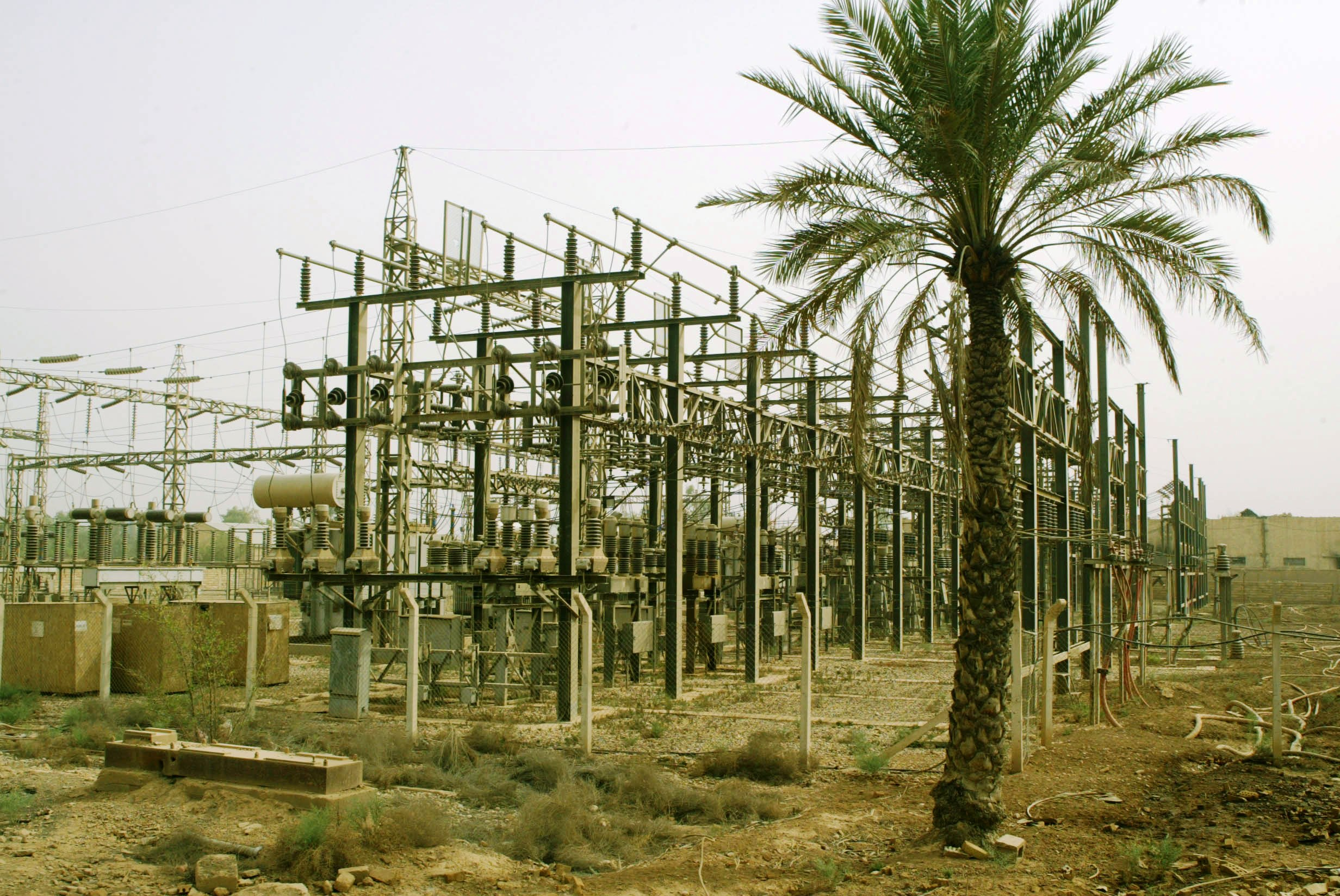
Electrical substation In Baghdad

A second auction took place in December 2009, and Iraq sold rights to seven oil fields for 20 years, increasing oil production 4.7 million barrels per day (750,000 m^{3}/d) in future. The production companies will receive between $1 and $5.5 per barrel produced:

- West Qurna Field 13-million-barrels (2,100,000 m^{3}) oil: Lukoil 85% and StatoilHydro 15%
- Majnoon oil field 13-million-barrels (2,100,000 m^{3}) oil: Shell and Petronas
- Halfaya Field: CNPC (Petronas / Total)
- Qaiyarah and Najmah field: Sonangol
- Garraf field: Petronas ja Japan Petroleum Exploration Company Limited JAPEX
- Badra field: Gazprom, Petronas, Korea Gas Corporation (KOGAS) ja TPAO

=== Electricity ===
Iraq electricity supply by source

Iraq's electricity generation primarily depends on fossil fuels. In 202, natural gas was the largest source at 50.4% of the total, followed by oil at 47.6%. Renewable energy, mainly from hydroelectric power, contributed 2%. As of 2023, the 30 gigawatts (GW) of installed capacity cannot meet summer peak demand.

In 2021, the majority of Iraq's electricity consumption was attributed to the residential sector, which used 65.0% of the total. This was followed by the commercial and public services sector at 21.6%, and industrial activities at 11.2%. The smallest share was consumed by the agriculture and forestry sector, accounting for only 2.2%.

According to the United States Department of Energy officials, demand for electricity has been stimulated by a growing economy and a surge in consumer purchases of appliances and electronics. In addition, electricity is subsidized in Iraq, which leads to increased demand.

Due to a weak grid and institutional problems many consumers use small generators or rooftop solar panels.

== Gas ==
Iraq holds the 12th largest natural gas reserves in the world, estimated at 131 trillion cubic feet (Tcf) at the end of 2022, predominantly located in large oil fields in the south and mostly associated with oil production. Despite these substantial reserves, Iraq faces regulatory, investment, and infrastructure challenges, which have kept natural gas production largely unchanged since 2016. The majority of Iraq's natural gas, about two-thirds, is produced as a byproduct of oil extraction. Following production cuts in 2020 due to the OPEC+ agreement, natural gas production dropped but recovered in 2021 with increases in both associated and non-associated gas production.

Iraq consumed significantly more natural gas than it produced in 2021, primarily for electric power generation. The country also flared over 630 billion cubic feet (Bcf) of natural gas in 2022 due to inadequate pipeline and processing infrastructure, making it the second-largest flaring country globally. To address flaring and meet domestic needs, Iraq has delayed its goal to eliminate flaring to 2027 and is working on expanding its natural gas processing capacity.

In 2022, Iraq was the second-largest contributor to global gas flaring, highlighting its ongoing challenges in managing flaring despite having substantial natural gas reserves. This significant flaring rate underscores the need for improved infrastructure and regulations to better utilize gas for domestic energy and reduce environmental impacts.

== Policy ==
Oil revenues are the major income in the economy of Iraq. The management of the oil and gas sector has been criticised as “technically incompetent”. As of mid-2024, oil exports to Turkey were very low.

=== Oil prices ===
Iraq is a member of OPEC.

The global oil and gas prices have been strongly influenced by political decisions and events. For example, the oil embargo 1967 and 1973 oil crisis during the 1970s, the Iran-Iraq War in the 1980s, the Iraq-Kuwait War in the 1990s and the Iraq War from 2003.

=== Corruption risks ===
One of the corruption risks is that the oil resources are publicly owned but often privately produced. The complex system of licenses and fees may drive corruption incentives. According to Transparency International Bribe Payers Index 2008, the oil and gas industry in general is highly vulnerable to 1) bribery of public officials and 2) undue influence on the legislative process and government policies. IMF Working Paper confirms the relationship between oil rents and corruption. Higher increases in oil rents tends to increase corruption and erode political rights. Open Budget Survey 2008 by International Budget Partnership confirmed that the oil- and gas-dependent countries tend to be less transparent.

== See also ==
- Climate change in Iraq
- History of Iraq
- Geography of Iraq
- Oil megaprojects (2011)
