= Geology of Iraq =

The geology of Iraq includes thick sequences of marine and continental sedimentary rocks over poorly understood basement rock, at the junction of the Arabian plate, the Anatolian plate, and the Iranian plate.

== Geologic history, stratigraphy and tectonics ==
The oldest rocks exposed at the surface in Iraq are part of the Cambrian and Ordovician age Khabour Quartzite Formation. Very little research and as of 1997 no boreholes have managed to reach underlying Precambrian rock. Most likely deeper basement rocks are part of the Afro-Arabian plate formed into a craton in the Proterozoic. Northeastern Iraq has a thinned quasicontinental crust due to Neo-Tethys extensional faulting and plastic deformation of rocks.

=== Paleozoic (539–251 million years ago) ===
In the Paleozoic, the Arabian plate was an extension of the African plate and a part of Gondwana oriented to Paleo-Tethys Ocean to the north. Grabens formed, accumulating thicker sediments although sedimentary rocks overall ranged up to four kilometers thick. Drilling in the Western Desert penetrated the Khabour Quartzite Formation down 1.67 kilometers without leading to depth estimates in grabens of three kilometers. In the late Silurian, deposition paused twice due to the Caledonian orogeny and the Hercynian orogeny resulted in a deposition break in the Carboniferous and Permian.

The Khabour Quartzite is overlain by the Akkaz Formation. The Pirispiki Red Beds and Chalki Volcanics from the Devonian are related to the global Kaskaskia marine transgression event, along with the Ora Shale and a sequence of limestone formations. The Ga'ara Formation and the Chia Zairi Limestone Formation deposited in the Permian. Chia Zairi rocks are particularly thick—up to 800 meters—and include the 61 meter Satina Evaporite Member, interpreted as the beginning of splitting of the Arabian plate into the Anatolian plate and Iranian plate. The Harur Limestone Formation in the Early Carboniferous marked a significant change in deposition that persisted into the Mesozoic and Cenozoic. Limestone, marl, evaporite and shale became the dominant rocks in northern Iraq while a mix of clastic and calcareous rocks was more typical in the south.

=== Mesozoic (251–66 million years ago) ===
In the Mesozoic, the Anatolian and Iranian plates fully separated and the Neo-Tethys Ocean opened. The Mesopotamian Zone (also known as the Mesopotamian Foredeep) and central Iraq had particularly thick sedimentary sequences. North-south axes are common in flexures in these rocks. In the Zone of Foreland Folding, rocks show signs of turbdiite and submarine fan deposits.

The 24 meter Beduh Shale Formation deposited in the Werfenian, overlying the 200 meter Mirga Mir Limestone. It is overlain by the Anisian and Ladinian age Geli Khana Formation up to 575 meters thick. These units deposited owing to rapid subsidence with the pull-apart of the crust and separation of the Iranian plate. The 36 meter Baluti Shale Formation formed in the Rhaetic, overlain by the 834 meter Carnian-Norian Kurrah Chine Formation and Liassic 303 meter Sarki Formation. Further to the south, lagoon conditions formed the Butmah Formation, Adaiyah Anhydrite, Mus Limestone, Alan Anhydrite and Sargelu Formation. The Najmah and Gotnia formations emplaced during the Callovian and Tithonian.

Through the Jurassic, the Nahr Umr, Mauddud, Rutba and Msad formations accumulated in what is now the Western Desert. The Foreland Folds Belt foreland basin accumulated calcareous material and argillite, including the 762 meter Balambo Formation.

In the Cretaceous, ophiolite obducted as the Penjwin-Shlair Complex, the Qulqula Radiolarites and the Khwakurk Series volcanics as the foreland basin witnessed 270 meters of sediment deposition. The Katarash volcanic rocks are indicative of uplift and mantle convection back-arc spreading. The Red Beds Series piled up near the subduction zone, where the Neo-Tethys Ocean crust was being subducted and consumed beneath the Anatolian and Iranian plates. The Naopurdan Group, Gimo-Qandil Group and Walash Volcanics formed in forearc and back-arc environments. Kolosh and Tanjero formation clastic rocks are from flysch sediments in the Neo-Tethys Ocean that remained on the Arabian plate continental margin.

=== Cenozoic (66 million years ago–present) ===
Combined Maastrichtian and Paleocene sediments range from as little as 100 meters to as much as 2.79 kilometers. During the Eocene, the Arabian plate began to underride the Anatolian and Iranian plates as the Neo-Tethys Ocean fully closed. Shallow seas and lagoons dominated the landscape, with periodic evaporite deposition such as the Gercus Formation. Other locations accumulated continental red beds. The Kirkuk Group, which hosts the large Kirk oil field, deposited during these transgression-regression cycles in the Oligocene.

The Jeribe and Serikagni formations and the Dhiban Anhydrite mark continued transgressions into the Miocene. The Fatha and Ghar formations appeared in the Middle Miocene, with recurring lagoon conditions, before the Injana Formation foreland basin marked the end of marine deposition.

The Mukdadiyah and Bai Hassan formations include 2.5 kilometers of conglomerate formed during the Alpine orogeny (the combined 354 meter Dibdibba and Zahra formations emplaced on the quasiplatform). Basement faulting was typical of the orogeny period as the Zagros Mountains began to form.
