= Iraqi =

Iraqi or Iraqis (in plural) means from Iraq, a country in the Middle East, and may refer to:

- Iraqi people or Iraqis, people from Iraq or of Iraqi descent
- A citizen of Iraq, see demographics of Iraq
- Iraqi or Araghi (Persian: عراقی), someone or something of, from, or related to Persian Iraq, an old name for a region in Central Iran
- Iraqi Arabic, the colloquial form of Arabic spoken in Iraq
- Iraqi cuisine
- Iraqi culture
- The Iraqis (party), a political party in Iraq
- Iraqi List, a political party in Iraq
- Fakhr-al-Din Iraqi, 13th-century Persian poet and Sufi.

== See also ==
- List of Iraqis
- Iraqi diaspora
- Languages of Iraq
