= Deafness in Iraq =

Deafness in Iraq describes the social, educational, and healthcare realities faced by the deaf and hard of hearing (DHH) in Iraq. The main sign languages used are Iraqi Sign Language and Kurdish Sign Language. The is a reported scarcity of early-intervention services and specialist providers in Iraq, and there are constraints on assistive technologies such as hearing aids and implants, which together contribute to risks and health disparities.

== Human and civil rights for DHH people in Iraq ==
The Deaf and Hard of Hearing (DHH) community in Iraq faces many different challenges, such as quality education, communication barriers, and healthcare challenges in their day-to-day life. Two of the main sign languages used in Iraq are Iraqi Sign Language and Kurdish Sign Language. Moreover, the children experience extreme language deprivation in Iraq due to a lack of mentors and teachers to educate deaf children and their families. As a result, the DHH individuals face many difficulties and challenges in public services, like communicating with a healthcare provider and seeking healthcare.

=== The UN CRPD ===
Iraq ratified the Convention of the Rights of Persons with Disabilities (CRPD) in 2010. The constitution "guarantees to all persons with disabilities the right to freedom from all forms of discrimination, providing them with opportunities to develop their capabilities and engage in the development of society".

- Sign language rights (Articles 2, 21.b, 21.3, 23.3, and 24.3b)
- Deaf culture and linguistic identity (Article 30.4)
- Bilingual education (Article 24.1, 24.3b, 24.4)
- Lifelong learning (Article 5, 24.5, and 27)
- Accessibility (Article 9 and 21)
- Equal employment opportunities (Article 27)
- Equal participation (Article 5, 12, 20, 23, 24, 29)

=== Iraq's State Party Report ===
==== Sign language rights ====
Sign language is recognized as a communication tool and states to provide support and access to sign language interpreters, especially in courts and for other legal procedures.

Article 21 includes various communication methods but does not provide information about promoting sign language in education or for public services.

==== Deaf culture and linguistic identity ====
Article 30.4 promotes persons with disabilities to participate in all cultural events and provides access to institutions. Information regarding DHH culture is limited within the state report.

==== Bilingual education ====
Emphasizes inclusive and special education to provide access to students with special needs to education. The Kurdistan Region of the country runs institutions specifically for DHH and mute, providing education based on their needs.

==== Lifelong learning ====
Protects persons with disabilities providing equal access to education and employment. The Iraqi government provides vocational and adult learning organizations, however, it has very limited scope. It is under the Minister of Culture and strategies for higher education.

==== Accessibility ====
Iraq "adopted building and infrastructure guidelines" to enhance physical accessibility. It includes ramps, signage and more.

Mobility aids and assistive technologies are mandated by law.

==== Equal employment opportunities ====
Article 27 enforces a 5% job quota in both public and private sectors for the persons with disabilities. Other additional supports such as access to loans for personal and business are also included.

==== Equal participation ====
Supports equality and inclusion based on the law and the Constitution. Provides the right to make their own decision, ensures that people with disabilities have access to transportation services which are essential for daily life and other participation services in public.

== Sign languages used in Iraq ==
=== Iraqi Sign Language (ISL) ===
One of the primary sign languages used in Iraq is Iraqi sign language (ISL). The full name in indigenous language is لغة الإشارة العراقية (Lughat al-Ishara al-Iraqiya). It was developed in the early 20th century, although the pathway of development is still unclear. It is primarily used by the deaf community within Iraq. The language has not been officially recognized as a national language by the government. However, it is used in deaf schools and rarely in some other educational institutions. The effort to support ISL and to increase its recognition in schools and for DHH are increasing.

ISL is considered as a vulnerable language and it is a threatened language due to lack of national support and it is primarily used only within the Deaf communities in Iraq. It also lacks recognition, limiting the usage of the language in the country itself. ISL shares some similarities with other neighboring countries' sign languages such as Syrian Sign Language and Lebanese Sign Language. The approximate age or number of users is not accurately documented as it is used barely in the deaf community itself. But it is documented that it is used in five to seven deaf schools or associations and neighboring cities and it has been used for approximately 100 years.

=== Kurdish Sign Language (KuSL) ===
Another prominent sign language that is used in Iraq is Kurdish Sign Language(KuSL). The full name in Indigenous Language is زبانەی هەماي کوردی (Zmani Hêmay Kurdi). The standard abbreviation is ZHK. It is solely a deaf community sign language and could be isolated. It is distinct from the Iraqi Sign Language but students could communicate with teachers however there would be verbal differences with certain words and vocabulary. KuSL is not officially recognized by the Iraqi government, it is used by the DHH within the Kurdistan region.

The Kurdish Sign Language is considered endangered due its limited usage and recognition by the government. Similarly like ISL, the KuSL origin is accurately documented but it could have originated from the establishment of the first Kurdish School for the deaf in 1982. The other sign language that could be influenced is ISL but it is very distinct too. Sign language is primarily used by students and it is only used by approximately 1000 students that attend one of the Kurdish deaf schools.

== Early intervention ==
In Iraq, there is very limited to no early intervention and the quality of education for the deaf is very poor. There is rarely any deaf school or in other cases families do not receive any support to teach their deaf children sign language. This is leading to language deprivation. Moreover, many deaf children are denied access to education. With families' concerns regarding high chances of language deprivation for their child, World Federation of the Deaf (WFD) recommends governments to implement programs that could support the families and deaf children to learn sign language with qualified deaf sign language teachers.

=== Universal Newborn Hearing Screening (UNHS) ===
As of 2017, Universal Newborn Hearing Screening (UNHS) has been mandated in Iraq. However, there is no data showing how many percent of new born babies are getting screened. Moreover, there is no data showing how many newborns are further referred for diagnostic follow up.

The general prevalence of permanent childhood hearing loss ranges from 0.3 to 1.5 per 1000 infants(median of 1.7 per 1000). No data has been found or published specifically for Iraq. It is assumed that the hearing loss diagnosis is to be right after birth but there is no data to support or fact check.

=== Assistive technology ===
Assistive technologies such as hearing aids and cochlear implants are limited in Iraq especially in urban areas of the country due to cost related issues. People in urban areas are not able to afford the cost for a hearing aid or cochlear implant and other factors such as lack of awareness, and non coverage of healthcare benefits.

Studies have been conducted to assess the impact of hearing loss on patients' quality of life. There's a high decline in social and environmental quality of life among the patients who are deaf and hard of hearing. The study suggests to improve auditory health services that provide assistive technologies as a solution to improving the individuals quality of life. There is no type of early intervention suggestion that helps the individual and their families to learn sign language.

=== Audiologists and specialists ===
Access and availability of audiologists in Iraq is limited facing challenges like shortage of audiologists and speech pathologists, and limited availability to deaf mentors and educators for the DHH. Information specifically to Iraq is limited; however, studies have been conducted in general for Arab countries and reports state shortages of pathologists and audiologists remain. If there is an availability of speech language pathologists or audiologists, there seems to be a long waiting list for services. Clinics are often concentrated in larger cities leaving a huge gap in urban areas and the individuals living in urban areas. Similar reports are found for deaf mentors and specialized educators. There is a significant lack of structured programs that provide access to deaf mentors and educators for DHH children in Iraq. There are some programs that exist such as the International Organization for Migration(IOM) but it is very region-specific and not applicable for all deaf and hard of hearing children in Iraq.

== Healthcare ==
Deaf and hard of hearing(DHH) individuals in Iraq face many health disparities. It included physical, mental and many other barriers that restrict them from accessing the right healthcare services. According to the World Federation of the Deaf, it is found that deaf individuals in general are up to seven times higher risk of experiencing cardiovascular diseases, high blood pressure and other chronic diseases due to the various barriers they face. DHH individuals in Iraq encounter challenges like communication problems with their healthcare providers. They have difficulty in interacting with the providers as sign language proficiency is very limited among the population. Moreover, specialized healthcare services are limited. There is a shortage of sign language interpreters at hospitals which significantly affects during medical consultations leading to misdiagnosis or poor treatment. According to the International Organization for Migration (IOM), 28% of deaf respondents reported that they needed access to sign language interpreters during their time of visits at hospital and continually faced a shortage of interpreters. Most of the doctors in Iraq are not proficient in the national sign language(ISL), making it harder for the DHH community to update about the ongoing problems.

=== Mental health disparities ===
One of the notable mental health issues faced by DHH in Iraq is social isolation. Patients who face challenges in explaining their health condition to the providers are more likely to experience loneliness and exclusion from society activities. It has been reported that the DHH community faced a greater challenge in knowing current events and news. Due to the extremely low sign language proficiency in the country, deaf people heavily relied on social media to obtain information about things like pandemic, vaccines, restricts and health treatment.

Lack of income for DHH individuals in Iraq is another reason that impacts deaf people's healthcare accessibility. Hospitals are not able to help them beyond a routine check-up and the patient is responsible and required to pay for all the tests and medicines prescribed by the healthcare provider.

=== Health literacy and ethical concerns ===
Health literacy among DHH individuals is extremely limited leading to poor health outcomes. It includes concerns like not being able to comprehend from healthcare providers in regards to their health condition. These concerns can lead to ethical issues like patient consent and confidentiality, as it does not allow the patient to fully understand the procedure.
