= Law of Iraq =

The Iraq's legal system is in a period of transition in light of the U.S.-led invasion in 2003 that led to the fall of the Ba'ath Party. Iraq does have a written constitution, which was enacted in 2005, as well as a civil, criminal and personal status law. In September 2008, the Iraqi Legal Database was launched. This site is a comprehensive database that makes all Iraqi positive law freely available (only in Arabic) to users online.

== History ==
=== The Ottoman Empire and Iraq ===
Under the rule of the Ottomans, Iraqi Law consisted of two components: Sharia (Islamic Law) and Kanun (State Law). Sharia dealt with matters of personal status, family matters, and religious affairs. Kanun was secular laws issued by the Sultan which covered taxation, land, the military, and criminal law. The judicial system consisted of Sharia, secular, and tribal courts, with the Qadis of Sharia courts ruling based on Islamic jurisprudence. After the Tanzimat period, secular Nizami courts appeared and were based on European legal codes.

=== Iraq Under the Mandate System ===
Iraq's legal history as a state begins with the collapse of the Ottoman Empire after World War 1. Great Britain assumed political control of Iraq and the area was brought under the mandate system from 1921 to 1932. Iraq was then divided into several administrative districts and declared a constitutional monarchy. Faysal Husayn (son of Sharif Husayn of Hejaz) was chosen to become the King of Iraq. Initially there was criticisms, especially in the Shi'ite south and Kurdish north, over having a Sunni sovereign who had no political roots in Iraq. The 1925 Iraqi constitution provided for three types of courts: Civil, Religious, and Special. The religious courts were the Islamic Sharia and, for non-Muslims, confessional courts. The Islamic Sharia court would be tailored differently for respective Sunni or Shi'ite Muslims.

=== Post Independence ===
A new civil code was introduced in 1951, heavily influenced by Egypt's civil code, which blended Islamic, Ottoman, and European law traditions. This code did not cover matters of personal status and so, a few years later the Personal Status Code of 1959 was put into effect with Sharia law being most prominent. The laws of personal status covered marriage, testamentary disposition, and inheritance. These rules, unlike previous law, were unitary regardless of religious sect. The biggest jump from Iraqi classical law was the issue of intestate succession. Prior to the reforms, after death an individual left 2/3 of their estate to their heirs, with males receiving two times the amount of land as females. The reform stipulated that males and females would receive equal shares, however this was repealed in 1963 after significant backlash.

The second Ba'ath revolution and the creation of the 1970 constitution defined Iraq as a democratic people's republic (for a unified Arab state and socialist system). During this time Saddam Hussein changed the name of Sharia courts to the courts of personal status. Article 7 of this constitution cements Islam as the official religion and ambiguosly cites it as a source of legislation. Furthermore, Article 12 includes a provision claiming equal rights before the law for all Iraqis regardless of gender, religion, nationality, sect, opinion, belief, or origin. In 1978, Law 21 increased the possibility for women to obtain a judicial divorce in addition to giving them increased rights over matters of child custody

=== Ba'ath Regime and Saddam Hussain ===
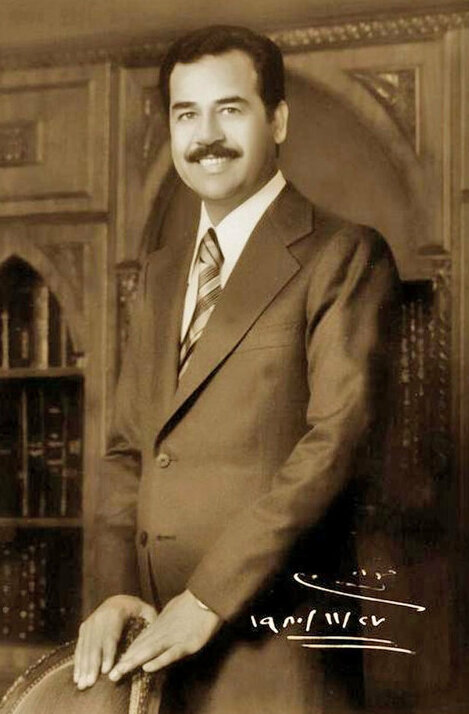
Saddam Hussain, Leader of the Ba'ath Regime, 1980

The Ba'ath Party defined itself as revolutionary and categorized itself as having a secular ideology of Arab nationalism. In 1968 the party established a provisional constitution under the Revolutionary Command Council as the supreme governing body of Iraq, with both legislative and executive authority. Under the rule of Saddam Hussein, all government officials were members of the Ba'ath party. Although an "independent" judicial system was established, it lacked the necessary provisions for the structure and all judges were appointed by the president. The regime's legitimacy was heavily derived from the nationalization of Iraq's oil industry. Once in power, they embarked on anti-imperialist development programs for socialism. Notable legal reforms included the codification of laws. The Iraqi Civil Code was kept in place and influenced by European legal systems like the French Civil Code. Citizens were free to enjoy many social and economic rights as long as they were not deemed a threat to the party and did not belong to one of the outlawed parties, or ethnic groups. At the core of the changes occurring in Iraq at this time was the expansion, bureaucratization, and securitization of the Ba'ath Party. Overall, while these formal legal structures and codifications existed, their implementation was greatly overshadowed by the Ba'ath Regime's authoritarian nature and repression of the people in general.

During the Iran-Iraq War the Ba'ath party played a crucial role in maintaining the social cost for all Iraqi citizens. At this time there was a high level of female participation in wartime efforts and Iraqi women were also discouraged from wearing the traditional black robe ('abaya) because the party felt it was "backwards". These women were rewarded with the issuing of amendments to the Personal Status Law in 1983 and 1985. These amendments accorded more rights to individual women within a family.

=== Reconstruction of Iraqi Law After the Hussein Regime ===
Saddam Hussein's Ba'athist Regime was overthrown in 2003 after the U.S. invasion of Iraq. The U.S. then led a Coalition Provisional Authority and an interim government was promptly established to operate under a transitional law. Several orders were instated as a temporary legal framework that included the De-Ba'athification of Iraq, the dissolution of the Iraqi army, and the restoration of an independent judiciary. When constructing Iraqi law, Egypt was used closely as a comparative tool or guide. The U.S. had appointed 25 Iraqis to form an initial governing council, which was intended to proportionately represent Iraq's ethnic and religious composition. The Iraqi Governing Council adopted an Interim Constitution in March 2004. This constitution guaranteed the rule of law, judicial independence, human rights and individual freedoms, and federalism and democratic elections.

A new, permanent constitution was ratified in a referendum in October 2005. This established Iraq as a federal, democratic, and parliamentary republic. Under this new constitution Islam was recognized as the official religion of Iraq and as a source of legislation. As with the interim constitution, the 2005 one sets out separation of powers, an independent judiciary, and human rights protections. The Constitution also established the Kurdistan Region as an autonomous federal entity.

Article 117 states "This Constitution, upon coming into force, shall recognize the region of Kurdistan, along with its existing authorities, as a federal region."

== Fields of Law ==
=== Constitutional Law ===
The current Constitution of Iraq was approved in a national referendum in October 2005 and stipulates the format of the new republican government, and the rights and responsibilities of the Iraqi people. Despite the rejection of the provinces of Anbar, Saladin, and Nineveh, the overall turnout was 63 percent, with more than 90 percent voting for its adoption.

The Constitution promises several civil liberties including freedom of speech, freedom of religion, freedom of peaceful assembly, freedom of expression, a free press, and a right to have a private life. All such personal liberties contain two main exemption clauses: the Iraqi Council of Representatives has the power to define what these freedoms mean, and, that no freedom may conflict with Islamic morality.

Islam is the official state religion, and no law may be enacted or enforced that violates the "undisputed" teachings of Islam. An official English translation of the Iraqi Constitution is available online at the Iraqi government's homepage.

There are legal experts, however, who criticize the failure of the 2005 Iraqi Constitution, particularly with respect to its perceived disastrous political consequences. For instance, an evaluation conducted by the International Crisis Group revealed that the federal system of government outlined in this fundamental law encourages ethnic divisions and manufactures pluralism. There are also observers who cite the "excessive concessions granted to the Kurds on the issues of federal government." This is blamed for the so-called weaknesses of the new Iraqi Constitution.

=== Criminal Code ===
In 2003, Paul Bremer led the Coalition Provisional Authority (CPA) and issued a series of binding "regulations", "memorandums", and "orders". On June 10, 2003, Bremer issued "Order Number 7" that stipulated that the binding Iraqi Criminal or Penal Code would be the 1984 vintage third edition of the law first enacted in 1969. Administrator Bremer made some amendments to both the Penal Code and the Criminal Procedure Code of 1971.

All the CPA orders, memoranda and regulations are available at the CPA Official Document Archive. An English translation copy of both codes prior to their CPA and subsequent amendment can be viewed online at the Case Western University website.

Order Number 31 also provides several amendments to the penal code, including:

- The maximum penalty for kidnapping is life imprisonment, and the mitigating circumstances provided in Penal Code Articles 426 Paragraphs 1 and 2 and 427 were repealed.
- The maximum penalty for rape and sexual assault in Article 393 is now life imprisonment.
- The maximum penalty for indecent assault in Article 396 is now fifteen years.
- The maximum penalty for the destruction of public utilities in Article 353 is now life imprisonment.

=== Civil Code ===
The Iraqi Civil Code was principally drafted by Abd El-Razzak El-Sanhuri, a French-educated Egyptian jurist who was also the principal drafter of the Egyptian Civil Code. In 1943, almost a decade after the push for a comprehensive modern code began in Iraq, Al-Sanhūrī was invited to Iraq by the Iraqi government and asked to complete the Civil Code. Working as the chairman of a committee of Iraqi jurists, using the Egyptian Civil Code as a model, he completed a draft of what would become the modern Iraqi Civil Code. The Iraqi Civil Code was enacted on September 8, 1951, and became effective two years later on September 8, 1953.

The Civil Code governs civil transactions: contracts, property, obligations, torts, etc. Iraqi Civil Code is modeled after Egyptian Civil Code, which included the Civil Code for Mixed Courts and the Civil Code for the National Courts Egypt's Mixed Court Code was modeled after the French Code. Although the Iraqi Code incorporates Islamic elements, its overall structure and substance is principally based on continental civil law. For example, in the case of an absence of a provision, judges are to rule according to custom and then according to the principles of Islamic Sharia. Overall, Iraqi Civil Code shares common substance and legal theory with other legal systems based on that model such as Egypt, France, Ethiopia, Spain, Italy, and the state of Louisiana.

The Iraqi Civil Code is divided into a preliminary part and two main parts, each main part composed of two books. The preliminary part contains definitions and general principles that find application throughout the rest of the code. Part I of the Code and its two books address obligations in general and subelements of that area of law, such as contracts, torts, and unjust enrichment. Part II and its two books address property, ownership, and real rights.

See Also: Iraqi Penal Code

=== Laws of Personal Status ===
In 1959, Iraq passed the Personal Status Law. This law came after the successful revolution against the British in 1958. During this revolt for a republic, women took on a larger role in the political atmosphere. As the law was drafted by the Iraq Women's League (a female led campaign dedicated to obtaining gender equality), it reflected progressive ideologies and a dedication to women's rights. The law protected women's interests in regard to marriage, divorce, and inheritance. It also granted favor to mothers during custody battles and prevented children from marrying. While the law signified a win for progressives, the law was frequently under attack from more conservative groups.

After the fall of the prime minister Abdul-Karim Qasim in 1963, more conservative ideology spread throughout the country. Some scholars believe the U.S. CIA backed the Ba'ath Party coup that overthrew Qasim in order to prevent the spread of communism. In 1963, some political leaders attempted to strengthen Islamic Law with an amendment that no longer made the practice of polygamy invalid. Throughout the 1960s, amendments were made which reduced the progressive nature of the original law.

In 1978, an amendment was passed that partially reflected the ideals of the female activists. For instance, it made it easier to request a divorce and it improved maternal custody rights. However, it failed to outlaw polygamy, prohibit forced marriage, and improve equal inheritance. In 1980, a new amendment allowed men to take a second wife as long as she was a widow. Over the rest of the 1980s and 1990s, various conservative and progressive changes would be made to the original law with many in regard to divorce.

After the U.S. created the Iraqi Governing Council, in December 2003, its leader passed Decree 137. This decree attempted to abolish the Personal Status Law of 1959. Rather than the government handling family issues for every Iraqi family in the same manner, the new decree would allow each case to be judged based on the beliefs of the family's religion or sect. This made family law less secular.

In January 2025, the Iraqi parliament passed another amendment. This allowed marrying couples to choose if they would like the 1959 Personal Status Law or the Shia Ja'afari school of Islamic jurisprudence to apply to their family. This school of legal philosophy differs from other schools since it subscribes to the Shi'a denomination rather than Sunni. In 1959, the Ja’afari school joined four Sunni schools as part of the Azhar University of Cairo. If the couple disagrees on which law to pick, the husband's choice is honored. This choice may not be changed later. Essentially, the law makes Shiite couples choose between religious or secular rulings. With the religious ruling, girls as young as nine would be permitted to marry. These conservative changes were made so the government would align more with Islam and less with Western ideologies.

=== Military Law ===
Iraqi Military Penal Code is the Baghdad Penal Code. It applies to officers, students of military schools, all persons employed in the Iraqi Army, and pensioned or dismissed officers, warrant officers, non-commissioned officers and men who have been discharged.

Principal penalties under military law cover the death penalty, imprisonment, forfeiture of seniority, confinement, dismissal, placement upon half-pay list, flogging, and reduction of rank.

Iraqi Military Penal Code military offences include:

- Offences Against the Safety of the State
- Endangering the Army During Mobilization
- Absence and Desertion
- Malingering or Injuring oneself in order to Evade Military Service
- Offences Against Military Discipline
- Misuse of Official Position
- Offences Committed Against Property or Person during Mobilization
- Other Offences Committed Against Property
- Dereliction of Duty
- Other Offences of Military Disorder
- Offences Committed Against Military Honor

=== Private Sector Law ===
Iraq's private sector governs private companies, foreign investment, labor relations, and public-private partnerships. The fundamental definition of the private sector was mentioned in Article 8 of the Law of Companies No 21 (1997) states: "A private-sector company is established on the agreement between two or more persons outside the nation sector, using private capital." Article 8, in addition, obtains a provision that includes private-joint stock or limited liability companies whenever the state gets a share of less than 25% of the capital. Internationally, it is universally accepted that the private sector represents the key part of the national economy that is not under direct state control and that is run for economic profit.

Companies Law No. 21 of 1997 governs the formation and operation of companies in Iraq. In 2019 an amendment was instituted capping foreign ownership at 49%, necessitating a majority (51%) Iraqi ownership. Corporate tax is imposed on all taxable profits at a flat rate of 15% with oil and gas companies subject to higher rates of 35% Article 28 of the constitution states that "Low income earners shall be exempted from taxes in a way that guarantees the preservation of the minimum income required for living. This shall be regulated by law".

=== Election Law ===
Paul Bremer legalized political parties and NGOs, and the specific rules regulating political parties were enacted by the 2004 Independent Electoral Commission of Iraq. Under these rules an Iraqi political party must register with the Commission in order to be entitled to have its endorsed candidates appear on the election ballot. Registration of a political party (aka "political entities") includes paying a filing fee of 2.5 million Iraqi dinars, a second party registration fee of 7.5 million dinars and petition signatures from five hundred Iraqi citizens.

Article 56 of the Iraqi Constitution lays out the electoral term of the Council of Representatives as four years, with a new council elected forty-five days before the termination of the existing term.

Article 102 describes the High Commission for Human Rights, the Independent Electoral Commission, and the Commission on Public Integrity as independent. However, they are still subject to supervision by the Council of Representatives and regulated by law.

Article 126 addresses the amending of the "fundamental principles" of Section One of the constitution as well as the rights and liberties of Section Two. These contents can only be subject to amendments after two consecutive electoral terms. Additionally, any amendments must be approved by:

- Two-thirds of the Council of Representatives
- The people in a general referendum
- Ratification by the President of the Republic (within one week)

More on the electoral laws of Iraq can be found in the 2005 Constitution.

=== International Law ===
Article 8 of the Iraqi constitution states:

"Iraq shall observe the principles of good neighborliness and adhere to the principle of non-interference in the internal affairs of other states, and shall seek to settle disputes by peaceful means. Iraq shall respect its international obligations.

Iraq is a member of the United Nations, the International Monetary Fund, the World Health Organization, and the International Labor Organization. The country also belongs to several pan-Arab organizations, including the Arab League and is a founding member of the Organization of the Petroleum Exporting Countries (OPEC). The Iraqi Red Crescent, a national humanitarian society, is affiliated with the International Committee of the Red Cross. Iraq is also bound to the ICRC's International Humanitarian Law.

The Iraqi government has ratified various international treaties and documents, including the Geneva Conventions and Protocol One, Biological and Chemical Weapons Conventions, the UN Convention against Corruption and the Convention on the Settlement of Investment Disputes. these can be found on the UN Human Rights Treaty Bodies website.

== Sources of Law ==
Iraqi Law is sourced from three main areas:

1. The Constitution - The Iraqi Constitution is considered the supreme legislative law.
2. Islamic Sharia Law - Sharia law is a foundational source of law in Iraq, and applies to personal status, family law, along with having constitutional recognition. Article 2 of The Constitution states "No law may be enacted that contradicts the established provisions of Islam."
3. Western Law - The legal reforms of Iraq after the fall of the Ba'ath Regime were largely influenced by the Napoleonic Code. Iraq also began to align with international legal standards, which drew heavily from western legal frameworks.

== See also ==
- Law enforcement in Iraq
- Iraqi Police
- Iraqi nationality law
- Iraqi Local Governance Law Library
- Federal Supreme Court of Iraq
