= Humanitarian response to the 2023 Turkey–Syria earthquakes =

Countries that offered help or condolences to Turkey and/or Syria after the earthquakes (Red: Turkey and Syria)

Various countries and organizations responded to the 6 February 2023 Turkey–Syria earthquakes. At least 105 countries and 16 international organizations had pledged support for victims of the earthquake, including humanitarian aid. More than 10 countries provided teams with search and rescue dogs to locate victims under the debris and monetary support was offered as well. Turkey was able to garner significant global support even among regional rivals and poorer countries, partly due to its focus on aid and disaster diplomacy for many years.

However, outreach to Syria was "less enthusiastic" than that to Turkey, mostly because of the international sanctions on the country and because of government limitations imposed on humanitarian organizations from operating outside areas of their control.

== Aid from United Nations member and observer states ==
=== Afghanistan ===
Afghanistan's Ministry of Foreign Affairs said that the government will send a relief package of 10 million Afghanis ($111,024) and 5 million Afghanis ($55,512) to Turkey and Syria, respectively, on the basis of shared humanity and Islamic brotherhood.

=== Albania ===
Albania dispatched 88 medical personnel, search and rescue specialists, and 9 specialized vehicles to Turkey. Additionally, Albania pledged 1 million euros in support of humanitarian relief.

=== Algeria ===
Algerian President Abdelmadjid Tebboune sent a message of condolences to his Syrian and Turkish counterparts. Algeria dispatched the first group of 89 Civil Protection agents to Turkey to participate in rescue and relief operations, and sent 210 tonnes of urgent humanitarian aid for disaster victims. Algeria has donated US$30 million to Turkey and US$15 million to Syria.

As of 10 February 2023, Algerian Civil Protection Teams in Syria and Turkey have rescued 13 people and pulled 84 bodies from rubble.

=== Argentina ===
According to a statement from the Argentine Foreign Ministry, Argentina's offer to Turkey and Syria includes socio-sanitary care, psychosocial and post-traumatic support, logistics personnel with experience in managing warehouses for donations and for the assembly of UNHCR houses and management of camps for affected people and shelters, water purification tablets and disinfectants, and management and training in their use for those affected. Four days after, Argentine rescue group saved two adults and a child. In May 2023, Argentina provided another dispatch of aid to Syria, consisting of four tons of supplies, including injectable medications, essential medical supplies, medical protections kits, and 90,000 facemasks.

=== Armenia ===
Prime Minister Nikol Pashinyan said Armenia stand ready to provide assistance. On 7 February 2023, Pashinyan held phone discussions with the Presidents of Turkey and Syria, following which the Government of Armenia confirmed the country would send search-and-rescue teams and food aid to Turkey and Syria. Armenia dispatched 57 search and rescue specialists to Turkey and Syria. A border crossing between Armenia and Turkey was opened to allow the passage of humanitarian aid. This was the first time the Armenia–Turkey border had opened since 1988, when Turkey sent aid to Armenia after the 1988 Armenian earthquake.

=== Australia ===
Australia's Prime Minister Anthony Albanese announced an initial humanitarian package worth AU$10 million (€6.5 million) to aid the recovery in Turkey and Syria. A 72-member search-and-rescue team was sent to Turkey.

CARE Australia launched an emergency appeal to provide emergency aid, including food, shelter, water, and other lifesaving supplies, to those affected by the earthquakes.

=== Austria ===
Chancellor Karl Nehammer said Austria will send 84 soldiers from its Disaster Relief Unit to Turkey and pledged €3 million for aid organisations. Austria sent 112 rescue workers, 8 rescue dogs, and 25 tons of material to the affected areas in Turkey, 85 of them soldiers from the Austrian Forces Disaster Relief Unit and the remaining from the Red Cross, fire brigades and mountain rescue units. A SARUV Austria/Samaritan Austria Rapid Response Team was also deployed to Turkey, which rescued a 15-year-old girl from the rubble.

=== Azerbaijan ===
Azerbaijan became the first country to provide assistance to Turkey. Azerbaijan dispatched a search-and-rescue team of 420 people to Turkey. The ministry also sent another aircraft carrying first aid kits, tents, bedding, medical supplies, and other necessary equipment to help those affected. President Ilham Aliyev said that Azerbaijan will send a search and rescue team of 370 people to Turkey, as well as a second aircraft loaded with supplies. It was reported that entertainment venues in Baku suspended streaming music in solidarity with Turkey. The number of Azerbaijani search and rescue team members reached to 900 in later days.

=== Bangladesh ===
Bangladesh sent a 46-strong medical and rescue team to Turkey along with the rescue equipment, medicine, tents and food. The rescue team includes 24 members from the Bangladesh Army, 12 personnel from the Bangladesh Fire Service & Civil Defence and 10 medical professionals along with one journalist. They left for Turkey by a Bangladesh Air Force C-130J transport aircraft. On 10 February, the team pulled out a 17-year-old girl alive from the debris. The Turkish Embassy in Dhaka called for support from the people of Bangladesh in the form of essential goods through TIKA's (Turkish Cooperation and Coordination Agency) campaign assisted by Turkish Airlines. Turkish Airlines offered to fly the relief to Turkey free of charge, and the Bangladesh government would assist with the customs requirements to ensure swift delivery of humanitarian aid. Bangladesh also sent 11 tonnes of humanitarian aid and medicines to Syria that include the required number of tents, blankets and dry food on a C-130J transport aircraft of the Bangladesh Air Force.

=== Belarus ===
Belarus sent two rescue teams to Turkey.

=== Belgium ===
Belgium sent the B-FAST team to Turkey and Syria to provide medical assistance, as well as releasing 5 million euros emergency aid for both countries.

Two Belgian telecom operators (Orange Belgium and Proximus) also provided free calls to Syria and Turkey.

Flemish Region

Jan Jambon, the Minister-President of Flanders, announced €200,000 to be pledged for aid, while the Flemish Red Cross released €200,000 of its funds.

=== Bosnia and Herzegovina ===
State level: Security minister Nenad Nešić said Bosnia and Herzegovina will send a group of 50 Civil Protection agents to provide assistance.

Defence Minister Zukan Helez announced that a 10-person medical team from the Armed Forces of BiH, plus a further 9 AFBiH specialists as part of the Balkan's Medical Taskforce response would also be deployed.

Federation of Bosnia and Herzegovina

The Federation of BiH sent an Urban Search and Rescue Unit, along with four search dogs, and specialized equipment.

Republika Srpska

On 7 February, 22 members Civil Protection of Republika Srpska arrived in Turkey and started rescue work. On February 10, additional 13 rescue workers arrived to Turkey.

=== Brazil ===
The Ministry of Foreign Affairs announced, in an official communiqué, that it is providing humanitarian aid to the populations affected by the earthquake. A 42-man team consisting firefighters from the states of São Paulo, Minas Gerais and Espírito Santo, doctors and members of the National Secretariat for Civil Defense and Protection and the Ministry of Integration and Regional Development departed Guarulhos for Turkey aboard a KC-30 aircraft.

=== Brunei ===
The Bruneian government donated $500,000 to Turkish Disaster and Emergency Management Authority (AFAD) for post-earthquake recovery in Turkey.

=== Bulgaria ===
Bulgaria was amongst the first countries to respond to the disaster. According to the Turkish ambassador to Bulgaria, Aylin Sekizkök, the country was the second to offer help, after Azerbaijan. The country dispatched 78 firefighters and rescue personnel from the Ministry of the Interior, 12 mountain rescue volunteers with 5 search and rescue dogs from the Mountain Rescue Service of the Bulgarian Red Cross, a surgical team of 4 from the Ministry of Defence's Military Medical Academy and 16 rescue workers from the Emergency Reaction Department of the Municipal administration of Sofia. The majority was airlifted to Adana Şakirpaşa Airport by five flights of C-27J Spartan aircraft of the Bulgarian Air Force, with part of the firefighters deploying from Plovdiv by land with 21 emergency vehicles. On February 9, additional 20 firefighters were airlifted, along with 30 volunteer doctors, nurses and paramedics from hospitals in Sofia and the city's ambulance service.

On February 9, additional 20 firefighters were deployed by air, along with 30 volunteer doctors, nurses and paramedics from hospitals in Sofia and the city's ambulance service.

=== Cambodia ===
Cambodia is sending $100,000 in aid to Turkey.

=== Canada ===
Canada refused to support the transport of humanitarian aid to Turkey, and instead announced an 'initial' $10M for earthquake help in Turkey and Syria. and later added an additional $30M in aid. A private, volunteer group based in Burnaby, British Columbia, traveled to Turkey to take part in search-and-rescue operations.

=== Chile ===
The Chilean government said that Chile would begin to provide aid to the people in the disaster area of Turkey and Syria and would work with the Chilean embassy in Turkey and the Turkish authorities to distribute aid.

=== China ===
China offered monetary support to both countries. and sent additional personnel to Turkey to help in the relief effort. General Secretary of the Chinese Communist Party Xi Jinping, said the country would send aid and medics to the affected regions. The government of China has also announced to offer 30 million yuan ($4.4 million) to Syria and 40 million yuan ($5.9 million) to Turkey as emergency humanitarian assistance.

On 8 February 2023, China's government rescue team, consisting of 82 personnel and 4 rescue dogs, landed at Adana Airport. Chinese civil society rescue teams with 52 members also headed to earthquake-stricken areas in the country. On 12 February, the Shenzhen Rescue Volunteers Federation made up of 467 people arrived in Turkey to do rescue work in 4 different quake-stricken regions.

Some Chinese personnel in Turkey assisted the rescue of several residents trapped by earthquake damage. By 13 February, Chinese teams in Malatya had removed 25 residents from under the rubble, 9 of whom were still alive. By 15 February, the Chinese team in Kahramanmaraş rescued 11 people before returning to China. As of 18 February, 600 tons of aid from China had been sent to Turkey.

On 7 February, the Red Cross Society of China provided US$200,000 in aid to Turkey and Syria respectively and also sent a rescue team and a batch of medical supplies for 5,000 people to earthquake-stricken areas in Syria.

Hong Kong

The government of Hong Kong dispatched a 59-strong team and two rescue dogs to Turkey to help search for survivors.

A Hong Kong Post-Crisis Counseling team Post Crisis Counseling Network (PCCN), an UN registered Humanitarian Response Mental Health & Psychosocial Supports organization, sent trauma psychological specialist team to the disaster stricken areas on 22 February 2023 to most of the earthquake affected areas including Adana, Kahramanmaras, Hatay, Gaziantep. PCCN also mobilize 300 more post-Crisis counselors from Hong Kong and 150 local for supporting the people in the coming 12 months.

One volunteer from International Association of Emergency Managers (Hong Kong SAR) assisted the United Nations to operate the Receiption and Departure Centre at Adana Airports for coordinating the rescue teams to conduct life-saving activities.

=== Colombia ===
President Gustavo Petro pledged that Colombia's foreign ministry would "establish contact in order to help concretely" for both Turkey and Syria.

=== Croatia ===
Prime Minister Andrej Plenković announced that Croatia's Civil Protection Service would send a search and rescue team of 40 people and ten rescue dogs to Turkey consisting mainly of Croatian Ministry of Interior USAR team and Croatian Mountain Rescue Service. Two specialist civil engineers from the Croatian Centre for Earthquake Engineering with recent experience in handling 2020 Petrinja earthquake were also dispatched. The Croatian Red Cross organised donations for Syria and Turkey. On 10 February 2023, Croatian parliament authorised sending of a humanitarian convoy consisting of approximately €819,601.50 of emergency supplies to Turkey, consisting mainly of supplies necessary for sheltering survivors. Croatia also donated a total of €200,000, split evenly between Red Cross and Caritas, to be used to help Syria.

=== Cuba ===
Miguel Diaz-Canel, first secretary of the Communist Party of Cuba and president of Cuba, and Foreign Minister Bruno Rodríguez Parrilla sent condolences to the people and governments of Syria and Turkey. Diaz-Canel shared his condolences on Twitter and offered collaboration. Cuba announced the deployment of 32 medics to Turkey and 27 specialized doctors to Syria.

=== Cyprus ===
The Republic of Cyprus said it was ready to send help to Turkey. The Cyprus foreign ministry said Turkey "kindly declined" its offer of a rescue team, which was initially accepted.

=== Czech Republic ===
Prime Minister Petr Fiala said that the Czech Republic would "provide help to Turkey via the 68 members of USAR team leaving today at 2 p.m."

=== Denmark ===
Minister for Development Cooperation Dan Jørgensen said that Denmark would provide DKK30 million (€4 million) for basic humanitarian aid in Syria and Turkey. A 12-people Danish-Finnish-Swedish Technical Assistance and Support Team with satellite and electronic equipment for coordination emergency efforts has been dispatched to Turkey.

=== Djibouti ===
Djibouti has donated $1 million to the Turkish Disaster and Emergency Management (AFAD) and sent relief goods to earthquake victims in Turkey and Syria.

=== Egypt ===
Egypt's President Abdel Fattah el-Sisi called his Syrian counterpart to offer assistance. Egypt said two planes transported medical aid to Turkey, while a volunteer team and three cargo aircraft were sent to Syria.

=== El Salvador ===
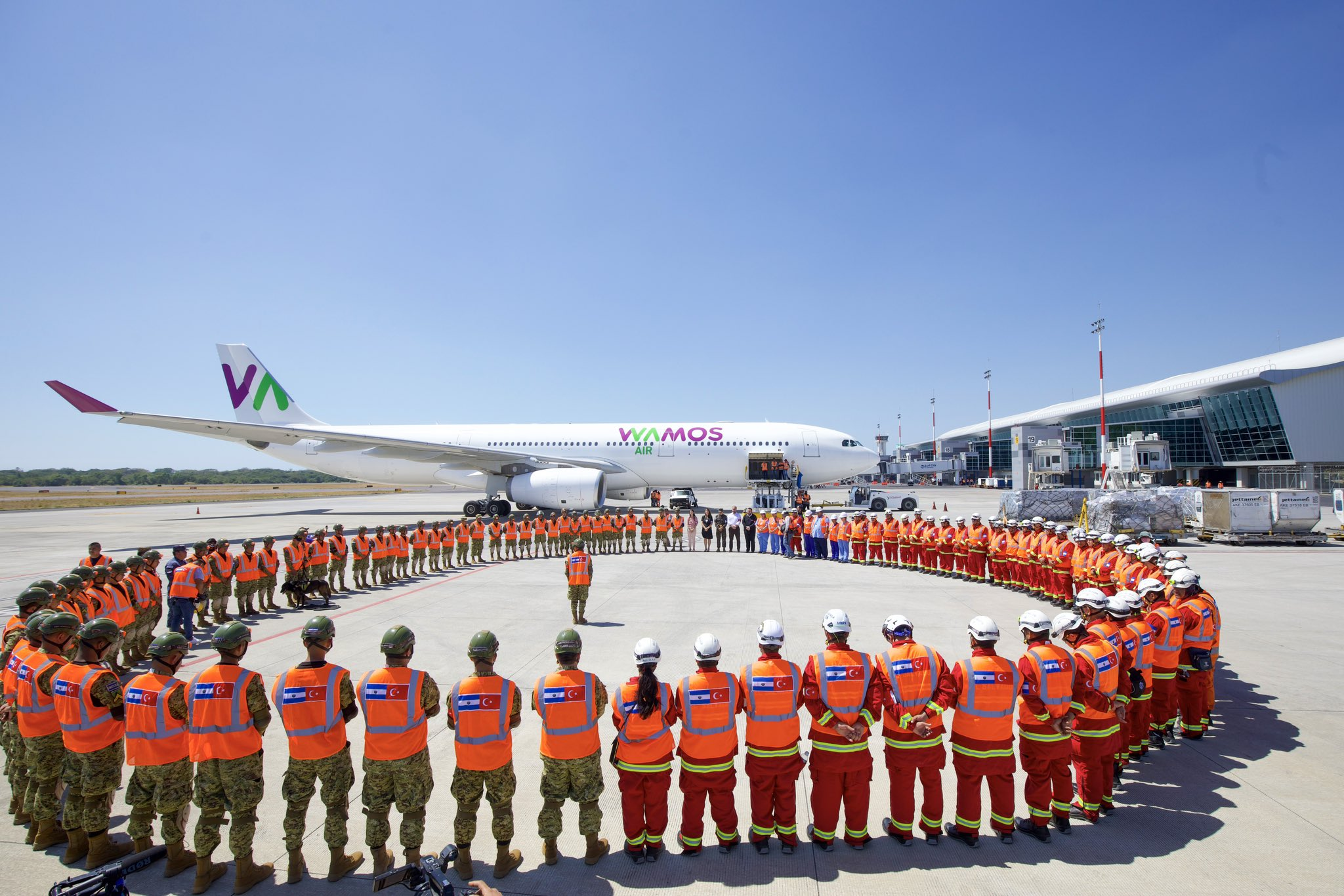
El Salvadoran USAR rescue personnel before departure to Turkey

President Nayib Bukele said "My government is ready to provide all necessary assistance to the government of President Erdogan." A search and rescue team was sent to Turkey. El Salvador sent 111 USAR rescue personnel and three rescue dogs. They arrived on February 9, 2023.

=== Estonia ===
Prime Minister Kaja Kallas said Estonia is ready to send urban search and rescue and medical teams. Forty-four members of the EST-USAR team, including ten medics, will be sent to the worst affected areas. The Ministry of Foreign Affairs allocated €400,000 of aid to help Turkey.

=== Ethiopia ===
President of Ethiopia Abiy Ahmed sent condolences and said that his country will send material and rescue teams to Turkey.

=== Finland ===
Minister for Development Cooperation and Foreign Trade Ville Skinnari said on 7 February that Finland would provide €1 million for basic humanitarian aid in Syria and Turkey. Additional grant of €12 million in humanitarian assistance to Turkey and Syria was announced on 20 March.

A 12-people Danish-Finnish-Swedish Technical Assistance and Support Team with satellite and electronic equipment for coordination emergency efforts was dispatched to Turkey in the wake of the earthquake. Further expert assistance and emergency accommodation, including tents, blankets, heaters and dried food, has been provided to Turkey and Syria.

=== France ===
Minister of the Interior Gérald Darmanin said France would send 139 civil security rescue workers to Turkey. France pledged €12 million in aid for Syrians, distributed through the United Nations and non-governmental organizations.

=== Georgia ===
Prime Minister Irakli Garibashvili ordered emergency support to Turkey. 60 firefighters with relevant rescue gear and machinery were dispatched. An additional team of 40 people was deployed on 8 February. The Georgian government allocated GEL1 million (€350,000) to provide humanitarian aid to the people affected by the earthquake.

=== Germany ===
Germany sent 50 rescuers and 7 dogs of the Technical Support Corps (THW) with 16 tons of material, as well as teams of the federal police. Germany committed €26 million to relief funds for Turkey and Syria. The German Air Force will fly humanitarian aid to Turkey. The German charity International Search and Rescue (ISAR Germany) sent 40 rescuers to Turkey, supported by several German Federal Police officers. Deutsche Telekom made calls between Germany, Turkey and Syria free for a week, and donated €1 million.

=== Greece ===
Immediately after the earthquake, the Greek government sent a rescue squad to Turkey, as well as "additional equipment, medical supplies, blankets, tents", with approval from the Turkish government. Specifically, a team of 21 firefighters, 2 rescue dogs and a special rescue vehicle were dispatched to Turkey from Elefsina on a Lockheed C-130 Hercules. Following the team was a fire brigade officer-engineer, 5 doctors and rescuers from the National Center for Emergency Care.

Greece's swift response to the humanitarian crisis in Turkey contributed to the hashtags "Teşekkürler Yunanistan" and "Teşekkürler komşu", translating into "Thank you, Greece" and "Thank you, neighbor" respectively, becoming popular on Twitter. According to Deutsche Welle, these developments marked the revival of the earthquake diplomacy between the two countries, once again.

On 8 February, more rescue teams departed from Greece for Turkey, including 15 firefighters and 3 lifesavers. Nation-wide campaigns to gather relief supplies such as blankets, clothes, milk powder, diapers, napkins, laundry detergents, serums, gauze, hand plasters, personal hygiene items, masks, gloves, antiseptics and medical equipment were initiated, and the items being gathered in Athens and Thessaloniki by humanitarian organizations and agencies, as well as in the smaller cities by the local municipalities and football federations. Additionally, the Greek PM ordered 5 airplanes full of health and medical equipment and basic necessities such as 7,500 blankets, 1,500 beds and 500 tents which can accommodate families and be used as mobile clinics, to be sent to Turkey. The Communist Party of Greece (KKE) called its friends and members for voluntary blood donation, in order to gather a stock of blood and send it immediately to the hospitals of Turkey and Syria in the provinces affected by the strong earthquake. Reports and footage was released on that day, of Greek rescuers pulling people from the rubble in Hatay, including at least four children.

On 9 February, upon his arrival at the European Council meeting, Greek PM proposed a donor conference for Turkey to be held at Brussels, so that additional financial resources could be found to help rebuild the affected areas and announced that his country would be "at the forefront [of these efforts] for organizing it".

By 10 February, reportedly "thousands" of Greeks had responded to calls for aid to quake-hit Turkey, with the Athens offices of the Hellenic Red Cross, piling up with sleeping bags, blankets, milk cans and boxes of medicine. A convoy carrying 40 tonnes of aid left for Turkey early that day. The humanitarian aid mission completed on midnight of February 13, with a total 8 airplanes transferring and handing over the supplies to the Turkish authorities. The cost of transporting the humanitarian aid is covered by 75% by the European Civil Protection Mechanism, while the remaining 25% is sponsored by private Greek companies.

On 15 February, the efforts continued with even more humanitarian aid being sent from Greece, with six trucks loaded with specific items requested by the Turkish side, such as blankets, tents, sleeping bags and chemical toilets. Additionally, 4 large containers with 50 tons of basic necessities are planned to be delivered through the Greek seaport of Patras two days later, on 17 February.

Greek Olympic gold medalist Miltiadis Tentoglou decided to auction his sports shoes which he worn in his long jumping performance at the World Athletics Indoor Tour in France on 15 February, with the proceeds to be donated for the child victims of the quake.

On 10 March, another humanitarian aid shipment loaded on three large trucks full of emergency supplies and a rescue vehicle, from the Hellenic Red Cross's warehouses, left for Turkey to be delivered directly to the Turkish Red Crescent warehouses.

On 20 March, Turkish Foreign Minister Mevlut Cavusoglu and Greek FM Nikos Dendias, in a symbolic move, entered together the hall of the International Donors' Conference in support of the people hit by the earthquake in Turkey and Syria, where the international community pledged 7 billion euros for the reconstruction efforts in the quake-hit areas.

=== Guyana ===
The Government of Guyana has donated US$100,000 for humanitarian aid to earthquake victims in Turkey and Syria.

=== Hungary ===
A fifty-strong search and rescue team, including six doctors were dispatched to Turkey, announced by Foreign Minister Péter Szijjártó. The number of dispatched personnel was later expanded to 156, with 28 rescue dogs. Hungary also provided immediate support worth HUF 40 million through its Hungary Helps Program to aid in the deployment of medical teams.

=== Iceland ===
Minister of Foreign Affairs Þórdís Kolbrún R. Gylfadóttir shared her condolences on Twitter. Iceland dispatched their search and rescue (SAR) team of 12 staffed by the local SAR volunteer organisation, ICE-SAR, on 8 February. A team of 9 experts was dispatched as well. The Icelandic Red Cross also sent emergency collections in the country.

=== India ===
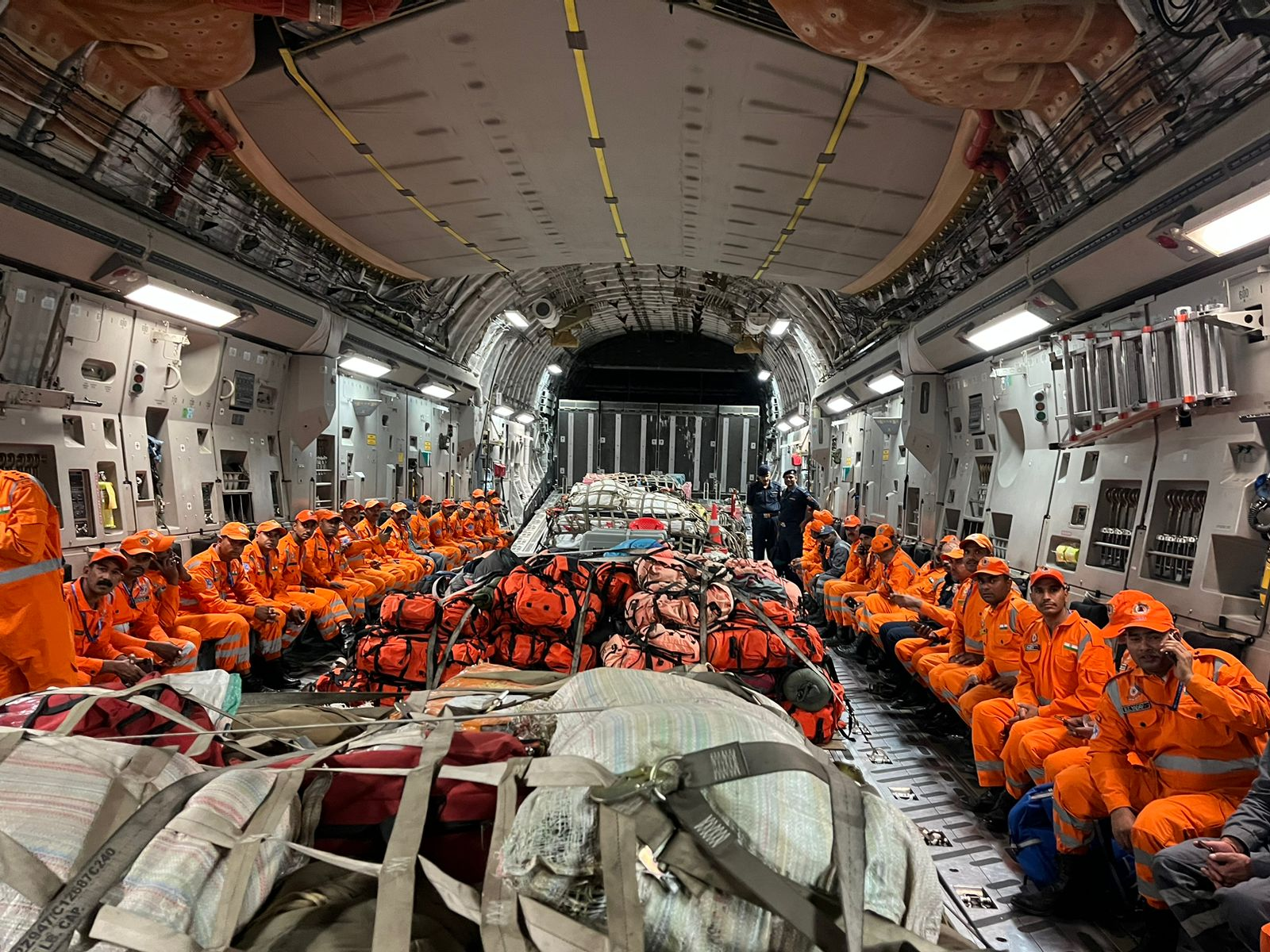
The Indian Air Force airlifts National Disaster Response Force along with equipment and rescue dogs to Turkey.

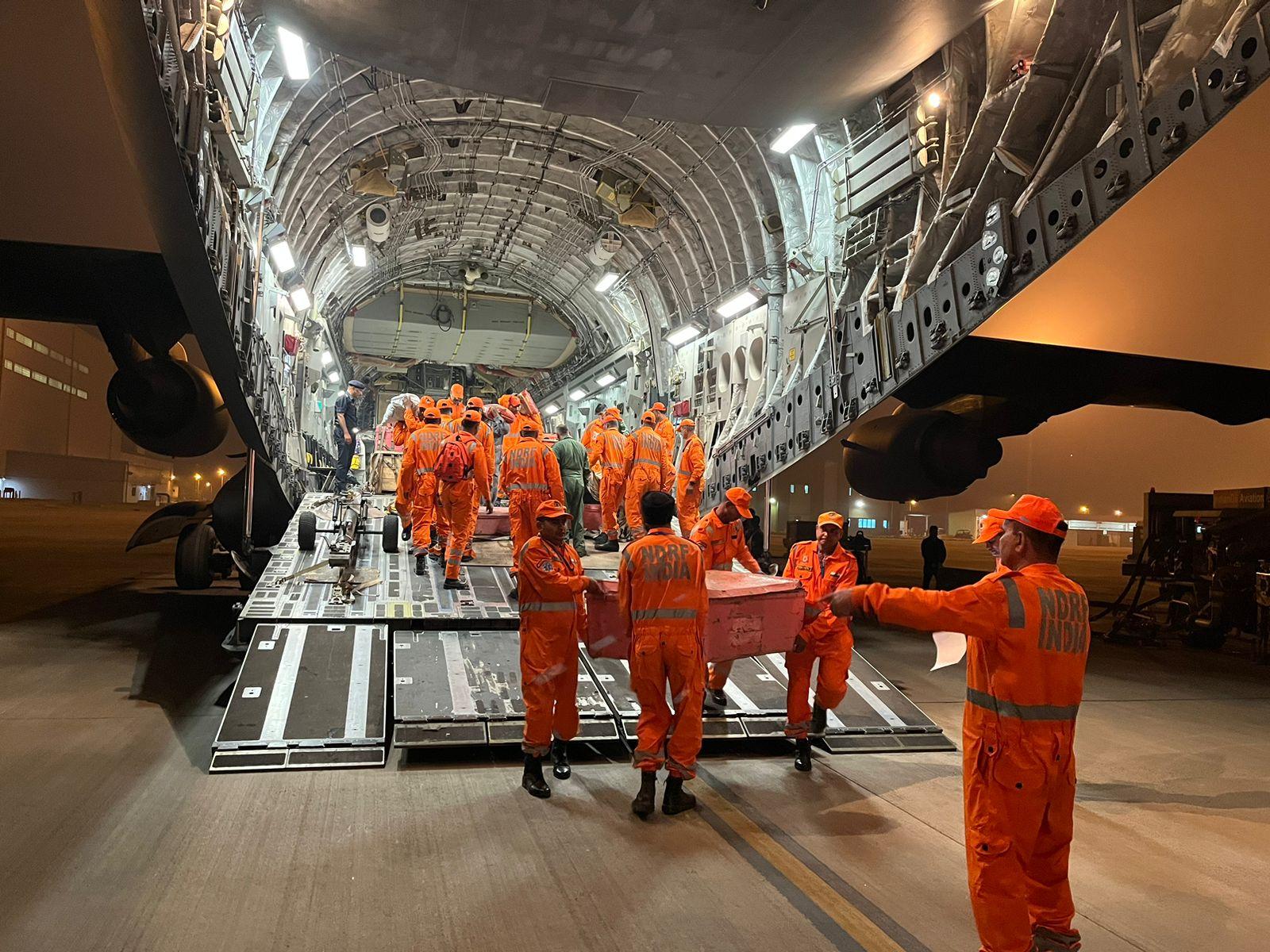
Airlift by IAF consist NDRF volunteers and equipments for rescue operations

India sent the National Disaster Response Force (NDRF) team to Turkey along with the Indian Army's medical team, consisting of 99 members from the Agra-based 60 Para Field Hospital. The medical team includes critical care specialist teams, including an orthopaedic surgical team and a general surgical specialist team. India sent ₹7 crore-worth (US$845,590) of relief material to both Syria and Turkey. The Indian Army prepared its rescue teams with relief materials within 12 hours after disaster struck. The first Indian Air Force plane carrying disaster relief material and a rescue team reached Adana consisted of 50 personnel and a specially trained dog squad along with necessary equipment, including medical supplies, drilling machines, and other aid equipment. It has sent two more C-17 aircraft with Humanitarian Assistance and Disaster Relief (HADR) to Turkey. On 9 February, India sent a total of six IAF C-17 Globemaster III aircraft carrying rescuers, dog squads, medicine, and equipment. and also it sent Droni drones for surveillance victims trapped under collapsed material and Kisan drones for carrying medicines and foods.

Two teams from the National Disaster Response Force (NDRF) were being prepared for search and rescue operations. The Indian Army has mobilised an 89-member medical team to earthquake hit Turkey. They are equipped with X-ray machines, ventilators, an oxygen generation plant, cardiac monitors and other equipment to establish a 30-bedded medical facility. By 8 February, India had dispatched nearly 150 rescuers and sniffer dogs to Turkey and Syria, as well as 130 tons and 6 tons of supplies to Turkey and Syria respectively.

Indian citizens also sent aid in the form of 100 blankets for the earthquake affected areas through Turkish Embassy in India.

=== Indonesia ===
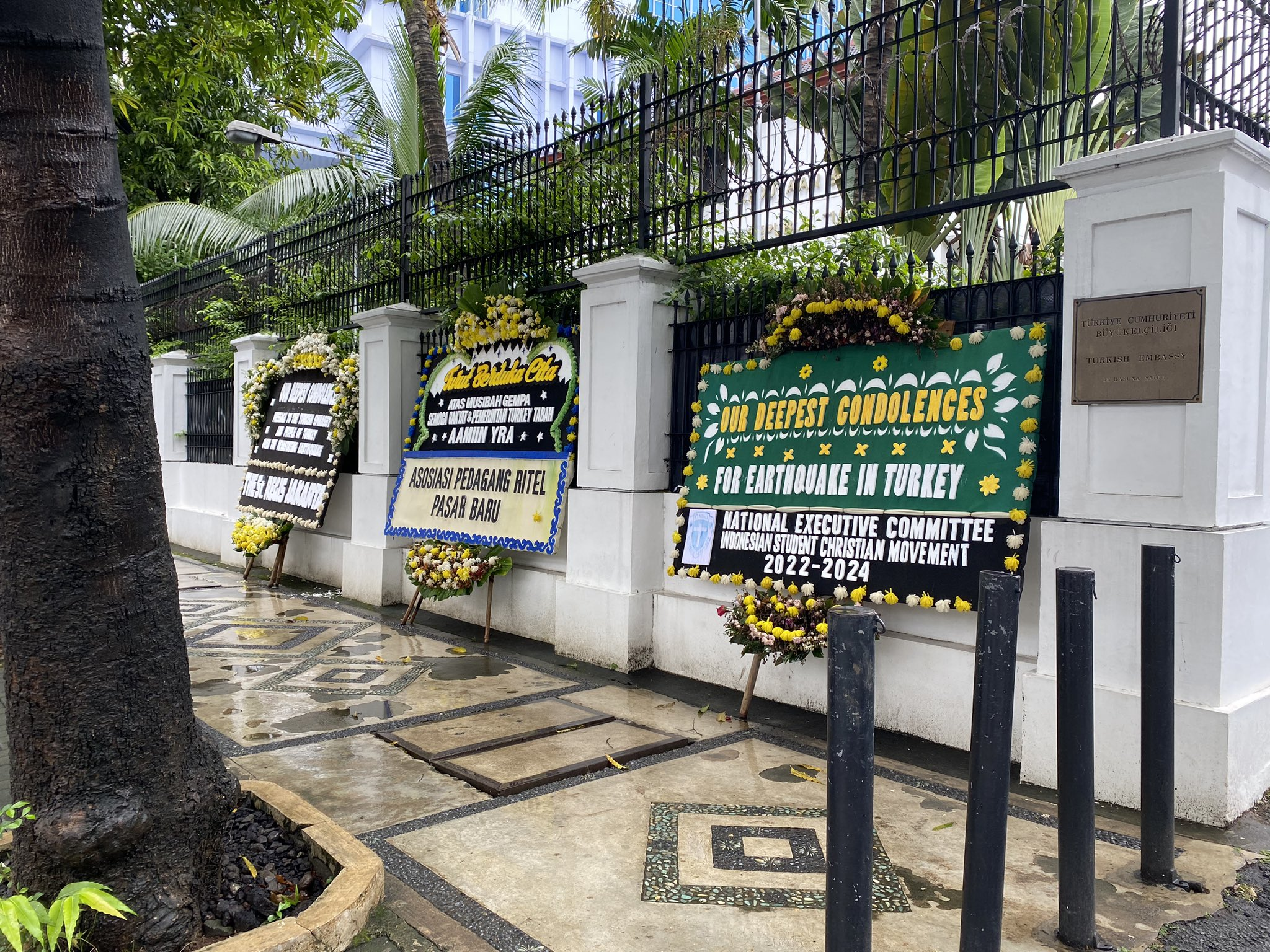
Condolences and sympathy expressed by Indonesian citizens with some flower arrangements in front of the Turkish embassy.

Indonesia dispatched humanitarian aid to Turkey from the Halim Perdana Kusuma Airport Base Ops with a Boeing 737 aircraft carrying 62 search and rescue personnel, a combination of 15 personnel from the National Agency for Disaster Countermeasure (BNPB) and 47 personnel from the National Search and Rescue Agency (Basarnas), as well as a Hercules C-130 carrying logistical assistance weighing 5 tons. Governor of Central Sulawesi, Rusdy Mastura, asked local governments in the province to also send aid to Turkey, referencing the fact that Turkey was among the first countries to assist the province during the 2018 Sulawesi earthquake and tsunami.

Additionally, the Indonesian government sent 120 support medical teams consisting of doctors, nurses, surgeons, psychologists, pharmacists and x-ray experts. Indonesian medical team established a 25,000 m^{2} type 2 field hospital in Hassa, Hatay Province. Logistical assistance of 40 tons in the form of medical equipment, medicines, tents, electric generators was also sent along with the medical team.

The Minister of Defense of Indonesia, Prabowo Subianto, also ordered the lending of the Hercules C-130 transport plane and its crew to help with logistics in Turkey. The aircraft with a carrying capacity of 10 tons will continue to help with logistics transportation in Turkey until March 2023. Making Indonesia the only country that lends planes for transportation and logistics in Turkey after the earthquake.

Further assistance from the Indonesian government departed on 21 February, with four planes carrying 140 tons of food, medicine, clothing and logistical equipment to Turkey and Syria.

=== Iran ===
Iran delivered 45 tons of medicine, food, tents, and blankets to Syria on 7 February. Bassem Masour, the head of the Syrian Civil Aviation Authority, said additional planeloads of humanitarian aid also arrived. President Ebrahim Raisi expressed Iran's readiness to provide "immediate relief aid." Ministry of Foreign Affairs spokesperson Nasser Kanaani said that Iran is ready to send health and aid teams to Turkey and Syria. He described the aid as a "moral, human and Islamic responsibility." United States accused Iran of using the cover of humanitarian aid to smuggle weapons into Syria.

=== Iraq ===
Iraq announced the establishment of a humanitarian air bridge to both Syria and Turkey, to send urgent relief aid, including medicine and fuel, according to a statement issued by the Iraqi Prime Minister's press office.

The first two aircraft from Iraq arrived at Damascus Airport in Syria to deliver 70 tons of foodstuffs, medical supplies, blankets and other aid supplies.

Iraqi Red Crescent said that first batch of humanitarian aid to Syria aboard by Iraqi Air Force planes, accompanied by a relief team from the IRCS and a team from the Iraqi Ministry of Foreign Affairs. A team of Iraqi Red Crescent volunteers, consisting of 150 paramedics, landed in Turkey for relief efforts.

Kurdistan Region

Three emergency aid teams were sent to Turkey under the command of Kurdistan Region's Prime Minister Masrour Barzani. The appointed teams involved members of the Ministries of Interior and Health as well as the Barzani Charity Foundation. Dr. Saman Barzanji, the Health Minister of the Kurdistan Regional Government, told the official website of Kurdistan Region Government: "The Prime Minister of Kurdistan Region called for conveying humanitarian and emergency aids to assist the victims of the earthquake. Under his command, aid teams consisting of doctors, experts, nurses, and ambulances as well as medicines were formed and sent to the earthquake-zone in Turkey in a few hours."

=== Ireland ===
Tánaiste Micheál Martin said that Ireland would provide €2 million in emergency funds for Turkey and Syria.

=== Israel ===
Israel deployed more than 430 search and rescue, disaster relief and humanitarian aid workers and sent more than 15 cargo planes with hundreds of tons of humanitarian aid and set up a field hospital, as of 8 February 2023, mainly to the areas of Adana and Gaziantep in Turkey. Of these, 230 were IDF medics operating an Israeli field hospital in Gaziantep, and 167 were from an elite search and rescue unit of Israel Defense Force officers from the Home Front Command. Footage was released on 8 February of Israeli rescuers pulling multiple people from the rubble, including a mother and her young son.

The IDF sent a delegation of 17 doctors, medics, rescue operators and psychotrauma specialists on 6 February, followed by a 150-member delegation on 7 February. United Hatzalah sent a delegation of 25 people including doctors, EMTs, and members of the Psychotrauma and Crisis Response Unit, and 10 search and rescue experts. The organization also sent 10 tons of medical equipment and humanitarian aid on 7 February. The team assisted in extricating 15 people from the rubble. IsraAid sent water purification systems to assist Turks needing clean water in the aftermath.

As of 7 February, the Israeli government sent over 30 tons of humanitarian equipment to carry out rescue missions in Turkey, and was planning on sending a second flight of humanitarian aid and medicine, according to a spokesperson for the Israeli Embassy in Washington. The establishment of an Israeli field hospital in Gaziantep was approved by Defence Minister Yoav Gallant.

On 12 February, United Hatzalah announced it would leave Turkey due to a "significant security threat" targeting the group.

=== Italy ===
Foreign minister and deputy prime minister Antonio Tajani said, "I just met with Turkish Foreign Minister Mevlüt Çavuşoğlu to express Italy's closeness and to have our civil protection ready." Italy donated €1 million to the Turkish Red Crescent and €750,000 to the Syrian Arab Red Crescent, and sent aid to the Syrian Arab Red Crescent via Beirut, Lebanon. The Italian Civil Protection sent a team of relief personnel that included members of the Ministry of Foreign Affairs' Crisis Unit, Carabinieri, and the Polizia di Stato's Scientific Police.

=== Japan ===
The Ministry of Foreign Affairs said it would send 75 rescue workers from the Japan Disaster Relief Rescue Team (JDR) to Turkey in order to conduct search and rescue operations. Humanitarian aid was sent to Syria through the Japan International Cooperation Agency at the request of the Syrian government. The Mizuma Railway in Osaka collected donations for the victims of the earthquake, with the flags of Turkey and Syria being hoisted. They also called for support, with messages of support "Do your best" written in Turkish and Arabic.

=== Jordan ===
Jordan announced it would send 99 rescuers, 5 doctors, search-and-rescue equipment, tents, and medical supplies to Turkey and Syria.

=== Kazakhstan ===
President Kassym-Jomart Tokayev offered assistance and emergency aid to Turkey. On 11 February, an aircraft carrying tents, clothes and medicines arrived in Aleppo.

=== Kenya ===
Foreign Affairs Cabinet Secretary Alfred Mutua announced that the country would donate clothing, medical supplies and foodstuffs, including tea, coffee and nuts, and that the country would send a search and rescue team to Turkey following a request from Turkish ambassador to Kenya Subutay Yuksel.

=== Kuwait ===
Emir of Kuwait Nawaf Al-Ahmad Al-Jaber Al-Sabah ordered the establishment of an air bridge to Turkey to send "urgent aid and medical staff". A social media campaign named "Kuwait by Your Side" was also launched, according to the Kuwait News Agency, which received a total of $42,000,000 in the first six hours of the event.

=== Kyrgyzstan ===
Kyrgyzstan President Sadyr Japarov sent his deep condolences and support to Turkey.

According to a press-release from Kyrgyzstan Foreign Affairs, they sent 182 rescuers with 6 specially trained dogs, 120 yurts, 20 warm tents, a medical team from Healthcare Ministry consisting of 6 doctors and 12 paramedics and a field hospital to the affected area. Turkish minister Ajikeev stated on 22 February 2023 that rescuers from Kyrgyzstan had successfully rescued 8 living people and retrieved 198 dead bodies.

Besides the humanitarian aid from the government, ordinary people from Kyrgyzstan gathered 6 tons of clothes, medical equipment, foodstuff, humanitarian aids, and donated more than 60 thousand dollars.

=== Latvia ===
Foreign Minister Edgars Rinkēvičs extended "deep condolences" to the bereaved families and wished a speedy recovery to all the injured.

=== Lebanon ===
The Lebanese General Directorate of Civil Defense dispatched 20 members to provide assistance in Turkey. The Lebanese Army will send 20 members of the Engineering Regiment to Turkey to participate in search and rescue operations.

=== Libya ===
Prime Minister Abdul Hamid Dbeibeh expressed his deep condolences to the victims of the tragedy in Turkey and Syria. He announced that the assistance his country will provide includes emergency workers and other experts. Libya will send a 55-member team to Turkey, including rescuers, medical staff and four dogs.

On 13 February Libyan Foreign Minister Najla Mangoush announced the donation of US$50 million to rebuilding areas that have been affected by the earthquake in Turkey, adding that this sum is the first installment to be followed by others.

=== Liechtenstein ===
The Ministry of Foreign Affairs expressed condolences through a press release and pledged a CHF200,000 donation, split between Turkey and Syria.

=== Lithuania ===
Lithuania will send a rescue team of around 40 people to Turkey, and transfer €200,000 to the Turkish government. Lithuania will also provide material aid worth around €328,000, including tents, electric heaters, bedding, blankets, medical equipment and medicines.

=== Luxembourg ===
Luxembourg pledged almost €1 million as emergency aid for Turkey and Syria. The country also sent satellite communications system called "emergency.lu" with an expert from CGDIS in order to support the search and rescue efforts in Hatay in Turkey.

=== Malaysia ===
Malaysia sent 70 personnel in the Special Malaysia Disaster Assistance and Rescue Team (SMART), including a medical team from the Army's Royal Medical Corps, the Malaysian Fire and Rescue Department's K9 Unit and a hazardous chemical materials special team to assist with urban search and rescue to Turkey within 24 hours after the earthquake.

The second SMART team was deployed on 8 February 2023; the team consists of 72 personnel from SMART, the Malaysian Civil Defence Force (APM) and the Malaysian Fire and Rescue Department (JBPM). An additional 106 military personnel, including 41 doctors was also deployed on 10 February 2023 to install a field hospital by two RMAF's Airbus A400M Atlas.

A financial aid of RM20 million (US$4.4 million) were sent to Turkey and Syria, and a donation campaign were also held. Non government organisation also sent financial aid and their own medical services task team to help.

On 11 February 2023, Malaysian rescuers pulled five survivors; two women, a man and two teenagers (a girl and a boy) out of the rubble.

=== Maldives ===
President of the Maldives, Ibrahim Mohamed Solih, announced the country would donate one million local tuna cans to Turkey and Syria.

=== Malta ===
Malta dispatched a team of 32 people and a rescue dog to Turkey.

=== Mauritania ===
President Mohamed Ould Ghazouani issued an order for the government of Mauritania to take the necessary measures to provide support to both Syria and Turkey. Mauritania sent a plane to Turkey carrying humanitarian aid consisting on fish, rice, dates and covers on 12 February 2023.

=== Mexico ===
President Andrés Manuel López Obrador said Mexico would send rescue teams to both countries, and a rescue team formed by Mexican military and Red Cross personnel left for Turkey on February 7. The team included 150 people and 16 dogs. On February 12, the Mexican Defense Ministry announced the death of one rescue dog named Proteo during the course of operations without giving further details.

=== Moldova ===
Moldova announced its readiness to send a mission consisting of 55 rescuers, 2 rescue dogs, and 12 fully autonomous intervention vehicles.

=== Mongolia ===
President of Mongolia Ukhnaagiin Khurelsukh sent a message of condolence to the President of the Republic of Turkey, Recep Tayyip Erdogan. Mongolia sent a search and rescue team of 35 and humanitarian aid to Turkey. The plane carrying the team also brought two search dogs called Marta and Balu, 1,500 woolen blankets, ten tonnes of meat, and two tonnes of candles to Turkey and Syria. Mongolian rescuers pulled two children and one adult out of the rubble on the first day of work, provided first aid and transferred them to a medical facility of the next level. The rescuers saved a 2-year-old child at 8:10 pm (Ankara time), a woman at 9:20 pm, and a 15-year-old teenager at 10:33 pm.

=== Montenegro ===
President Milo Đukanović expressed condolences on behalf of the country, and offered any help needed. Montenegro sent 24 firefighters to Turkey.

=== Nepal ===
The government of Nepal announced that they would send medical teams and necessary relief materials to Turkey.

=== Netherlands ===
Minister of Foreign Affairs Wopke Hoekstra announced that the Netherlands would send a search and rescue team to Turkey.

The Netherlands deployed 4 rescue teams including 65 people and 8 dogs. Collection campaigns for aid and money were launched. At some places there was even a stop of the collection because too much was received. In the first few days several million Euro were collected.

The nationally wilde collection day Giro 555 raised €88.9 million on February 15.

=== New Zealand ===
Foreign Affairs Minister Nanaia Mahuta announced a humanitarian package worth NZ$1.5 million to aid humanitarian recovery efforts in Turkey and Syria. Prime Minister Chris Hipkins also expressed condolences for the victims, stating "we know a little bit about earthquakes in New Zealand so our hearts are with them." Later, another NZ$3 million was provided, of which 2 million will be given to the World Food Programme in Turkey, while 1 million will go to UNICEF in Syria. New Zealand will also provide two information management specialist to help coordinate international search-and-rescue efforts in Turkey.

=== Nigeria ===
Turkish embassy in Nigeria announced that they would send important needs like winter clothes, blankets, tents, bed mattresses, foods, etc. to Turkey. Nigeria also donated $1 million for Turkey-Syria earthquake victims.

=== North Macedonia ===
A team of 40 rescuers and 22 special forces members were sent by North Macedonia, including around €100,000 in financial aid, 10,000 blankets and 200 sanitary stretchers. An additional 36 special forces members were sent.

=== Norway ===
Prime Minister Jonas Gahr Støre said that Norway would provide NOK150 million (€13.5 million) for basic humanitarian aid in Syria and Turkey. Four experts in crisis coordination will be dispatched to the affected region.

The Norwegian Refugee Council, a humanitarian, non-governmental agency, said that they would provide direct support to those most affected across Syria. They appealed to the international community for the immediate mobilization of financial resources to support collective relief efforts in Syria and southern Turkey.

=== Oman ===
Oman operated an air bridge to transport relief aid and medical supplies to Turkey and Syria. A search-and-rescue team was also dispatched to Turkey.

=== Pakistan ===
Pakistan sent humanitarian aid to both Turkey and Syria, while also dispatching rescue workers and doctors to Turkey. An official 51-member Rescue 1122 team from Pakistan was sent to Turkey at earliest. Later two Pakistan Army teams also joined relief and rescue operation in Turkey and Syria taking the total number of rescuers to over 200.

The Pakistani Prime Minister Shehbaz Sharif said that the federal government has established a Rs 10 billion relief fund for earthquake-hit Turkey. He and the federal cabinet of Pakistan decided to donate their one-month salary to the relief fund. The aid contingents have flown to Adana via a special Pakistan Air Force aircraft on the night of February 6–7, 2023, to undertake relief efforts for the Turkish people while working in close coordination with the Turkish government, AFs and their Embassy in Islamabad. On the instructions of the Prime Minister, the National Disaster Management Authority (NDMA) is mobilizing all available resources including winterized tents, blankets and other critical life-saving supplies. Urban Search and Rescue Teams trained to operate in disaster hit areas are being dispatched with their equipment and medicines. 16 aid trucks carrying winter tents and blankets set off from the city of Lahore to Turkey.

Several Pakistani charities, including the Al-Khidmat Foundation, Baitussalam Welfare Trust and the Edhi Foundation, have also been engaged in the relief and rescue operations in different earthquake-hit areas.

The Chairman of the Pakistan Red Crescent Society, Sardar Shahid Ahmed Laghari, has donated $50,000 to the Turkish Embassy and $25,000 to the Syrian Embassy in Pakistan for the relief and recovery efforts of earthquake victims in Turkey and Syria.

An anonymous Pakistani American businessman living in the United States donated US$30 million to the Turkey-Syria earthquake victims according to officials. In a Zoom Telethon, Pakistani American doctors raised $365,000 for the victims.

In February 2023, the NDMA sent PNS Nasr carrying 1,000 tonnes of relief goods for the people of Turkey and Syria. In March 2023, the NDMA sent PNS Moawin carrying a 367-tonne consignment of 2,625 family-sized fire-resistant winterised tents and 38,370 blankets for quake-affected Turkey. It also carried another 179-tonne consignment of 22,000 blankets and 144 tonnes of essential items of daily use for Syria.

=== Paraguay ===
On 6 February, the Paraguayan Ministry of Foreign Affairs released a message saying "Paraguay wishes to convey its heartfelt condolences to the families of the victims and to the Government and the people of Turkey, in addition to wishing for the recovery of the injured and affected, and the prompt rescue of the people who are still missing as a result of the earthquake." In addition, the foreign ministry also said that they were willing to provide "the humanitarian aid that is within its reach to deal with this tragedy."

=== Philippines ===
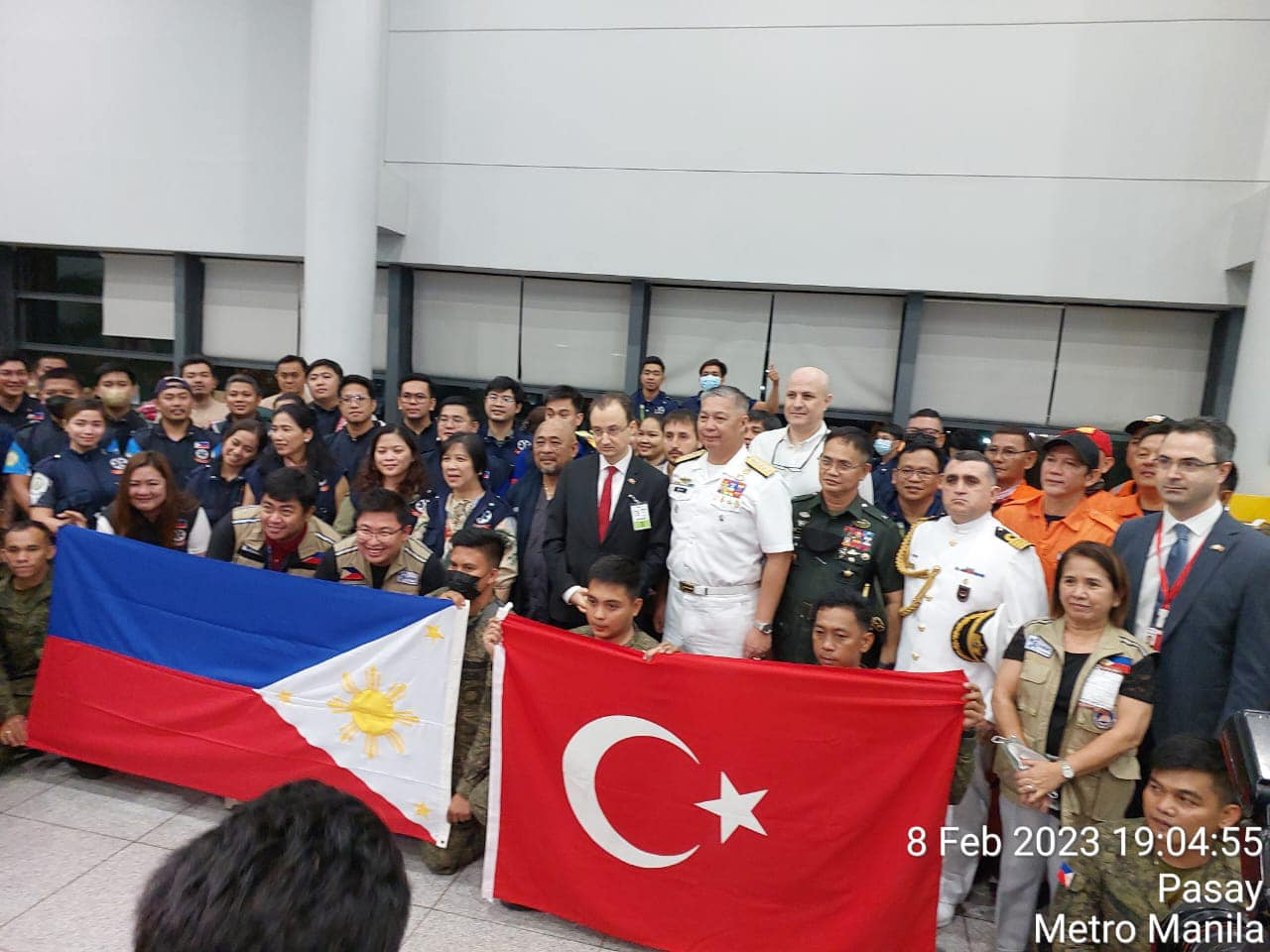
The Philippine Humanitarian Contingent bound for Turkey.

President Bongbong Marcos pledged to send a medical and rescue team to Turkey. A contingent composed mostly of Armed Forces of the Philippines personnel and some from the Office of Civil Defense, Metropolitan Manila Development Authority, Subic Bay Metropolitan Authority, and 30 emergency medical technicians from the Department of Health arrived in Turkey on 9 February. The Philippine Red Cross gave $100,000 each to Turkey and Syria for relief and rescue operations. The House of Representatives speaker Martin Romualdez gave $100,000 financial assistance for the quake victims through the Speaker's Disaster Relief and Rehabilitation Initiative. The country's government also donated more than 11,000 blankets, 5,000 bonnets and 420 pairs of gloves for the survivors.

=== Poland ===
A special group of the Polish State Fire Service – Heavy Urban Search And Rescue (USAR) Team, consisting of 76 firefighters, 5 medics, 8 rescue dogs and 20 tons of dedicated equipment left for Turkey on 6 February. A second group, a 50-member miners rescue team, was scheduled to arrive at Besni, Adıyaman on 8 February. A third group consisting of 52 military medics also planned to leave on 8 February to set up a field hospital in Turkey.

=== Portugal ===
On February 8, a rescue team made up of 53 members and 6 dogs of the National Republican Guard, Civil Protection, Sapper Firefighter and National Institute of Medical Emergency doctors left for Turkey.

=== Qatar ===
Emir of Qatar Tamim bin Hamad Al Thani said a search and rescue group as well as supplies will fly to Turkey through an air bridge. About 10,000 cabins and caravans from the 2022 FIFA World Cup would be donated to serve as shelters for people in Turkey. On 13 February, the first batch of 350 cabins and caravans were mobilized. On 24 June 2023, Qatar completed the delivery.

=== Romania ===
Three aircraft of the Romanian Air Force that have on board teams specialized in search and rescue interventions of the General Inspectorate for Emergency Situations of Romania (IGSU) and SMURD medical teams, consisting of 60 members, 4 rescue dogs, and related specialized equipment, left for Turkey on 6 February following the disaster. On February 8, Romanian authorities sent a second RO-USAR team to Turkey to help with the search and rescue of survivors of the earthquakes. The search and rescue teams have increased to almost 120 people and are made up of emergency management specialists, healthcare workers and attendants of seven utility dogs that take part in missions in disaster areas. The Romanian Ministry of Health mobilized health professionals for disaster relief and organized a blood donation campaign in order to ship blood products into affected areas.

=== Russia ===
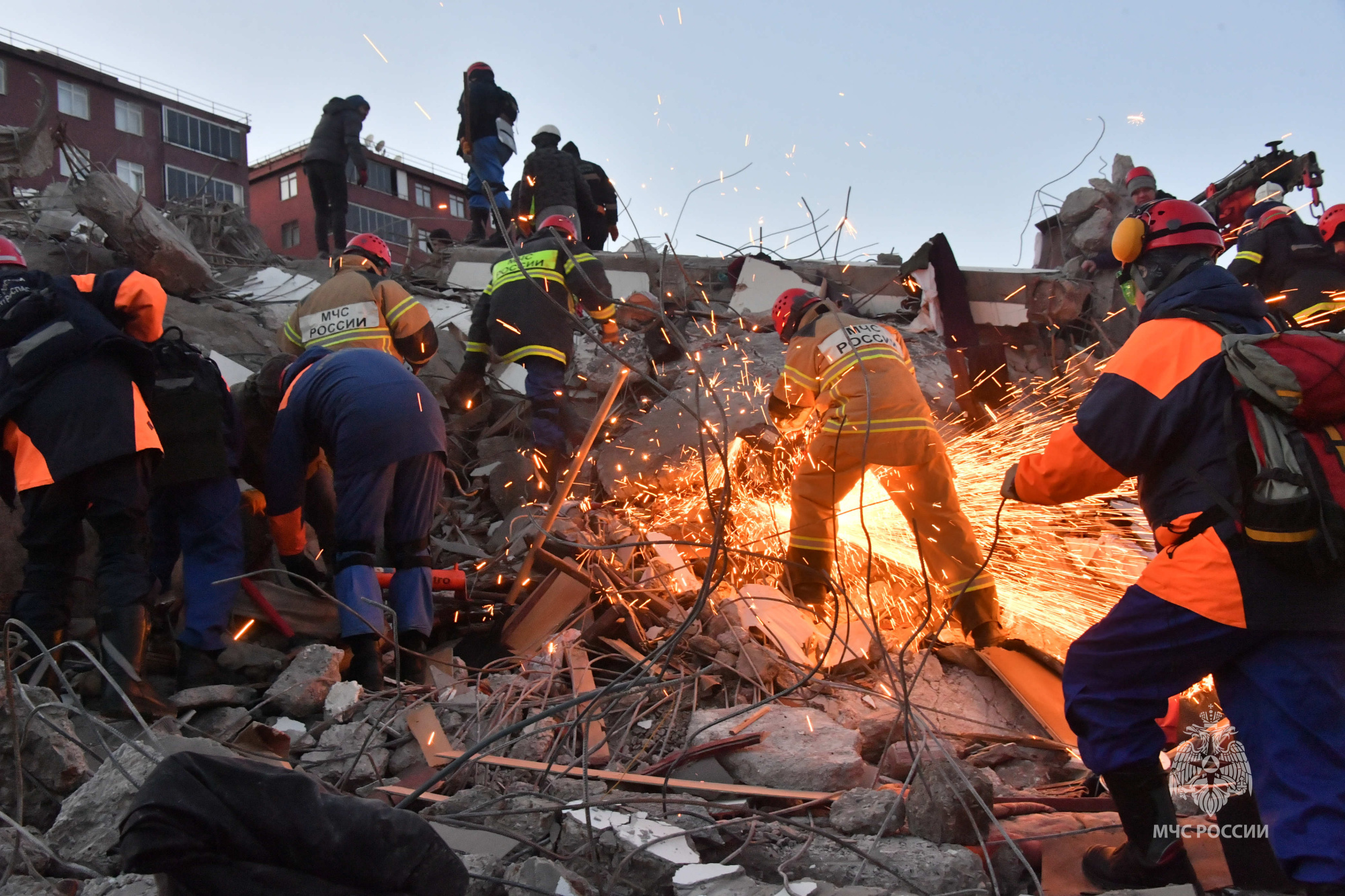
Russian rescue team working amongst rubble after the earthquake

Two aircraft of the Emergency Situations Ministry with 140 rescuers, 7 canine SAR and an airmobile hospital were sent to Turkey. Along with food, water, aid, medicine, and money. Russia showed strong solidarity with Turkey Another EMERCOM aircraft was sent to Syria with 50 rescuers and 3 canine crews. Defence Minister Sergei Shoigu ordered Russian forces in Syria to help with the rescue effort.

Bashkortostan

A volunteer team was sent to the affected areas in Turkey. The search and rescue team consists of 25 people and a rescue dog.

=== Saudi Arabia ===
King Salman of Saudi Arabia and his Crown Prince Mohammed bin Salman directed King Salman Humanitarian Aid and Relief Center to operate an airlift, provide shelter, food, and logistical aid to alleviate the effects of the earthquake on the Syrian and Turkish peoples, and organize a national campaign through the "Sahem" platform to help the victims of the earthquake in Turkey and Syria. The platform had already received donations in excess of US$3.4m before the announcement of the campaign. The campaign raised more than US$50m in the first 48 hours after its launch. As of 21 February 2023 the donations have exceeded ر.س 428,000,000 (US$114 million). Saudi Arabia sent rescue and medic teams that arrived in Turkey on Thursday, 9 February 2023. Another aircraft carrying 98 tonnes of relief supplies also landed in Turkey's Adana airport on the same day.

=== Serbia ===
Serbia dispatched two special teams (28 people) and liaison officers to help Turkey along with equipment for breaching and cutting, lifting, rescue, work at heights, and electronic search. They saved 2 women who were trapped for over 100 hours. The Belgrade Philharmonic donated its earnings from a concert to the areas damaged by the earthquake. The Red Cross of Serbia called citizens to donate, and sent a total of RSD7.5 million (€64,000), and the Serbian Philanthropic Forum, together with the Svetionik association from Novi Pazar, collected almost RSD5 million (€42,670). Patriarch of the Serbian Orthodox Church Porfirije invited everyone to bring help for the victims in Syria and Turkey to the Sunday liturgy. The Syrian embassy in Belgrade asked for humanitarian aid, and there people can donate to the Syrian damaged areas.

=== Singapore ===
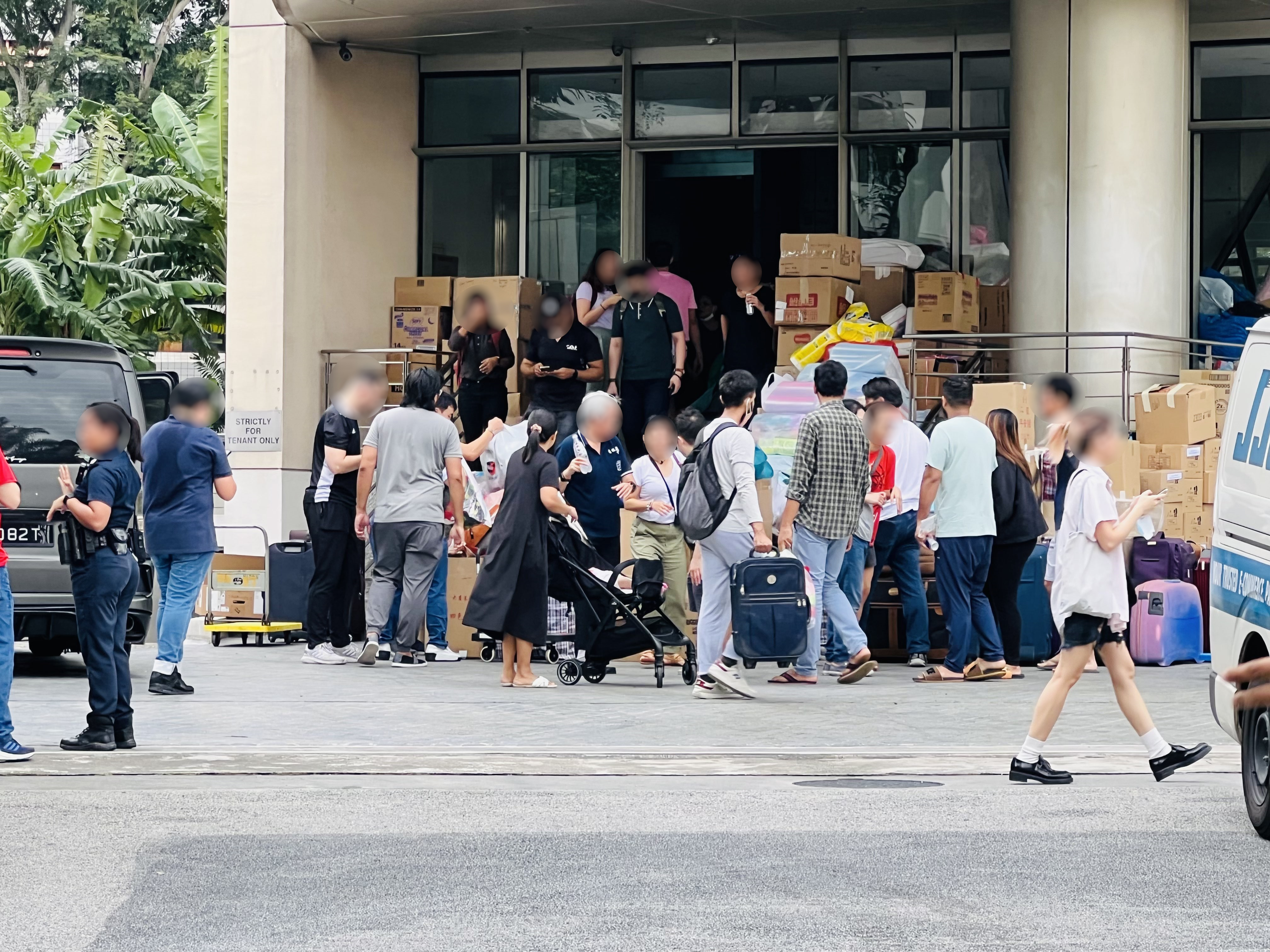
Collections of donations by Singaporeans for the earthquake victims bound for Turkey

Singapore dispatched its specialised Disaster Assistance and Rescue Team (DART) of the Singapore Civil Defence Force (SCDF) on 7 February 2023, with an initial team of 20 personnel, from a contingent known as Operation Lionheart. On that same day, the Turkish Ambassador to Singapore Mehmet Burçin Gönenli also visited the SCDF headquarters to thank the Operation Lionheart contingent. In addition, the Singapore Red Cross (SRC) also announced that they would also engage in immediate relief and recovery operations, pledged US$100,000 in humanitarian aid, as well as activating its Restoring Family Links (RFL) service to help Singapore residents, specifically the Turkish community in Singapore, to look for affected family members.

On 8 February 2023, an additional 48 members of SCDF personnel and four search dogs also left for the city of Adana to provide humanitarian assistance. SCDF added that from Adana, the team would be deployed to the affected areas to commence search and rescue operations. In total, there were 68 SCDF personnel deployed. On that same day, a boy was rescued by an SCDF team from a collapsed building in Dulkadiroğlu. During this time, thousands of Singaporeans also heeded to the call for donations by the Turkish Embassy in Singapore. Donations of physical items overwhelmed the embassy's office within hours and the embassy had to stop accepting them on their premises. A second donations collection point was subsequently announced, which was put in place until 10 February 2023. A call for volunteers was made to have the items packed for delivery to Turkey, while the embassy subsequently requested for cash donations to provide Turkish authorities some flexibility in acquiring needed items as the list of needs would change constantly as recovery efforts back in Turkey picked up.

=== Slovakia ===
Prime Minister Eduard Heger announced that 13 firefighters and two mountain rescuers with dogs would travel to Turkey.

=== Slovenia ===
The Government of Slovenia announced that it would dispatch three civilian experts for assessing the damage and coordinating rescue efforts. On 7 February, one expert (on operational coordination) was dispatched to Turkey. At the same time, the government also offered assistance of a canine search-and-rescue team (seven dog handlers with dogs and three support personnel) and started preparing technical assistance package (tents, blankets, generators) to be sent if such assistance is needed.

Later on the same day (7 February; Tuesday), a SAR team (seven dog handlers with dogs, three support personnel and one coordinator) was dispatched to Turkey. The next day (8 February) the team started search efforts, eventually (during several days of searching) finding several dozen people, trapped in the rubble. On 11 February, the team was repatriated due to the injuries sustained by all the dogs and diminished chances of locating other survivors.

=== Somalia ===
President Hassan Sheikh Mohamud and the Ministry of Foreign Affairs (Somalia) both sent condolences to Turkey on February 6. Members of the Federal Parliament voted to donate 20% of their February salaries to support earthquake victims. A donation campaign for humanitarian relief funded by the government, public, and the business community brought the total contribution of Somalia to $5 million.

=== South Korea ===
President Yoon Suk-yeol pledged humanitarian assistance for both Turkey and Syria. The following day, the government approved sending a rescue team consisting of 118 members to form Korea Disaster Relief Team (KDRT)— 60 of them sent from the National Fire Agency, Ministry of Foreign Affairs and KOIKA, while the other 50 sent from the Ministry of National Defense. They sent KC-330 Cygnus which is an Airbus A330 MRTT to transport them. A total of $5 million worth of humanitarian aid is being sent alongside medical supplies through military transport aircraft, and is also the largest rescue mission being sent by South Korea at once.

=== Spain ===
Prime Minister Pedro Sánchez said, "At the request of the European Civil Protection Mechanism, the Ministry of Interior, through the Directorate-General for Civil Protection and Emergencies, activated the Military Emergency Unit (UME) and emergency air transport for support in search missions". Spain prepared to deploy two urban search-and-rescue teams numbering 85 people and a contingent of volunteer firefighters to Turkey. Spain also set up a field hospital in Turkey and donated €1.5 million to the Red Crescent. A Spanish Navy Amphibious Task Group deployed in the Mediterranean, including the amphibious assault ship Juan Carlos I, landing platform dock Galicia and 500 marines, was diverted to the Turkish coast to participate in relief efforts, including humanitarian aid distribution, debris removal and medical assistance. To ensure a stable humanitarian supply chain, the Air and Space Force established an airlift between Spain and Turkey.

=== Sri Lanka ===
Sri Lankan Foreign Minister Ali Sabry contacted the Foreign Ministry of Turkey and offered assistance.

=== Sudan ===
The Sudanese Ministry of Interior's Police Force has sent a 40-member search and rescue team to Turkey. The team is also carrying 1,000 blankets, 250 tents and food materials as well as a large number of search and rescue equipment.

=== Sweden ===
Foreign minister Tobias Billström said, "As Sweden's EU Presidency, we will reach out to Mevlüt Çavuşoğlu and Syria to coordinate EU efforts to assist these countries in this disaster." The government has provided SEK37 million (€3,299,598) for humanitarian aid in Syria and Turkey. A 12-people Danish-Finnish-Swedish Technical Assistance and Support Team with satellite and electronic equipment for coordination emergency efforts has been dispatched to Turkey.

=== Switzerland ===
On 6 February, the Swiss Agency for Development and Cooperation (SDC), part of the Federal Department of Foreign Affairs, sent 80 specialists and eight dogs to take part in search-and-rescue operations in Turkey. On 8 February, additional personnel were sent, taking the number to 87 specialists. On 10 February, the SDC announced that will send a team of 12 specialists including psychologists, logistics experts, doctors and accommodation specialists. It will also send four specialists to Aleppo, Syria to assess and realise humanitarian aid on the ground. The SDC also released CHF 7 million to support both countries.

=== Tajikistan ===
The Tajik government sent 50 rescuers and 2.5 tons of rescue equipment to Turkey, and 55 tons of humanitarian aid to Syria.

=== Tanzania ===
President of Tanzania Samia Suluhu Hassan sent condolences to Turkey and Syria. The country also donated $1 million worth of aid, according to the country's Chief Government Spokesman Greson Msigwa.

=== Thailand ===
King Maha Vajiralongkorn expressed his deep condolences to the victims of the tragedy in Turkey and Syria. Prime Minister of Thailand presented an initial humanitarian aid of ฿5,000,000 (approximately US$150,000) from the Royal Thai Government to the Government of Turkey, received by the Turkish Ambassador to Thailand. The Department of Disaster Prevention and Mitigation announced that a 42-person Urban Search and Rescue team and two rescue dog have been deployed to Turkey.

=== Tunisia ===
Tunisia promised 14 tons of blankets and food to Turkey.

=== Turkmenistan ===
Turkmenistan is sending a humanitarian aid plane, along with a rescue team to Turkey.

=== Ukraine ===
The State Emergency Service of Ukraine sent an 88-member team to Turkey, including search-and-rescue specialists, doctors, dog handlers and firefighters.

=== United Arab Emirates ===
President Mohamed bin Zayed Al Nahyan ordered an aid package totalling $100 million to Turkey and Syria ($50 million per each) for earthquake relief. The UAE also said it will dispatch search-and-rescue teams in Turkey and Syria, and set up a field hospital in Turkey.

=== United Kingdom ===
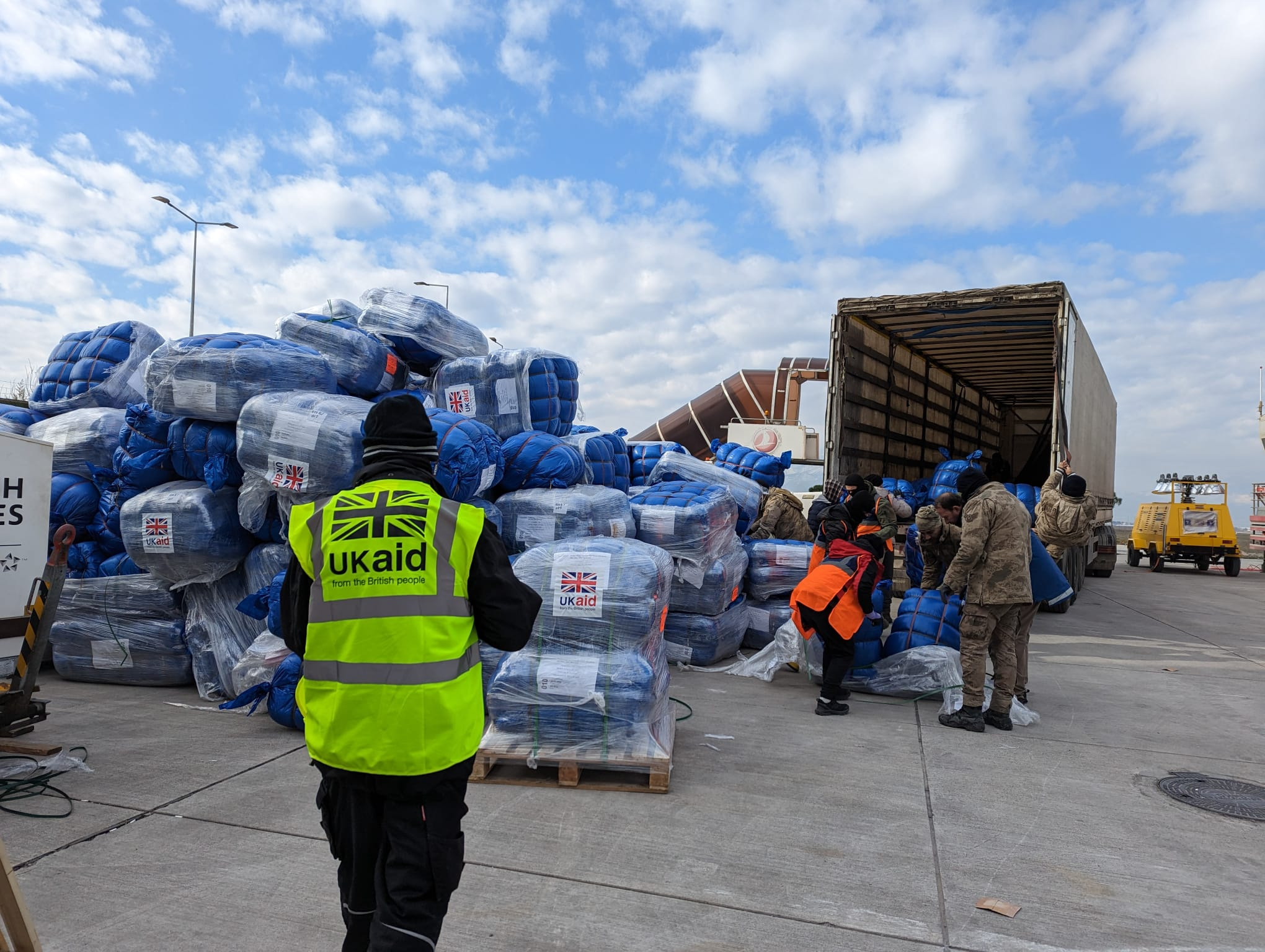
Parcels of UK aid delivered to Turkey on 10 February 2023

British Foreign Secretary James Cleverly said that rescue teams and equipment were being sent to Gaziantep. The rescue team has 77 members and has its own search dogs. The UK gave £3.8 million to the White Helmets organisation operating in Syria, and pledged another £3 million.

The Premier League donated £1 million to the Disasters Emergency Committee. The East London Mosque, in partnership with the Islamic Relief, Diyanet UK, and other charities, collected £60,000 for the earthquake victims. King Charles and The Prince of Wales also made separate personal undisclosed donations to the Disasters Emergency Committee. The MoD deployed a Medical Treatment Facility, led by 16 Medical Regiment, to Turkoglu, where they worked with Turkish Medical teams and NGO UK EMT to provide medical care.

=== United States ===
The United States Agency for International Development (USAID) deployed a Disaster Assistance Response Team of around 200 people to Turkey, including 159 search-and rescue personnel, 12 dogs, experienced emergency managers, hazardous materials technicians, engineers, logisticians, paramedics, planners, and 170,000 pounds (77,000 kg) of specialized tools and equipment. Two other search-and rescue teams were also sent: VA-TF1, containing 79 people and 6 dogs, and CA-TF2, which had 78 members. The US pledged $85 million in aid through USAID to Turkey and Syria, and US helicopters helped transport rescue personnel throughout the disaster area in Turkey. On 20 February, Antony Blinken said the US would pledge a further $100 million to Turkey.

Hamdi Ulukaya, the Turkish founder of Chobani, pledged to donate $2 million. Amazon pledged to donate $600,000 to humanitarian organizations and to supply emergency cold weather equipment.

=== Uzbekistan ===
President Shavkat Mirziyoyev ordered a search-and-rescue team and humanitarian aid sent to Turkey. He expressed his condolences to the family members and relatives of the deceased and wished the victims a speedy recovery. The Ministry of Emergency Situations announced that a search and rescue team and humanitarian aid will be sent to Turkey by the decree of President Mirziyoyev.

=== Vatican City ===
The Roman Catholic Church allocated €500,000 for emergency aid.

=== Venezuela ===
Venezuela sent aid to government-controlled areas of Syria. This aid included medicine, water, and food.

=== Vietnam ===
On 9 February, 100 rescuers of the Vietnam People's Armed Forces including personnel from the Police Department of Fire Prevention and Rescue (Ministry of Public Security) as well as troops from the Vietnam Border Guard and Army Medical (Ministry of National Defence) were sent to Turkey along with equipment, medical supplies and food. This marked the first time Vietnam ever deployed this type of overseas rescue mission. On February 11, a 17 year old, Abuzer Baran Bakir, was jointly rescued by the Vietnam, Pakistan and Turkey rescue teams from the rubble after nearly 140 hours of entrapment.

=== Yemen ===
Yemeni embassy represented by globally-recognized legitimate Presidential Leadership Council (PLC) in Turkey together with Yemeni diaspora and refugees in Turkey collected ₺17 million (approximately $900,000) for donation to earthquake victims in Turkey and Syria despite their home country still in a civil war of legitimate Yemeni government against Houthi rebels since 2014.

== Aid from states with limited recognition ==
=== Kosovo ===
President Vjosa Osmani said that Kosovo was "ready to provide the necessary assistance through the Kosovo Security Force." A specialized contingent was sent to Turkey later that day. President Osmani, in honor of the victims in Turkey and Syria, declared 8 February 2023, a national mourning day.

=== Northern Cyprus ===
President Ersin Tatar expressed their solidarity and said that they are sending search and rescue teams of 59 people and 8 vehicles in total.

Northern Cyprus (Note: Northern Cyprus is only recognized by Turkey, while the rest of the international community considers it as part of Cyprus. See also Cyprus problem.) announced seven days of national mourning for the victims of the earthquake and also sent a rescue team to a collapsed hotel in Adıyaman, where a volleyball team from Famagusta was staying when the earthquake hit.

=== Palestine ===
The Palestinian ambassador to Syria announced the death of 8 Palestinian refugees, including three children. President Mahmoud Abbas instructed the country's embassy in Damascus to provide all that is necessary to support the families of the victims. The Palestinian Authority will send two humanitarian missions to Syria and Turkey, include civil defense and medical teams.

=== Taiwan ===
Taiwan (Note: The Political status of Taiwan is disputed. See also: Two Chinas, One China, Cross-Strait relations, China and the United Nations, Retreat of the government of the Republic of China to Taiwan, and Four-Stage Theory of the Republic of China.) sent 130 people and 5 rescue dogs to assist in rescue operations. The rescue work began in Adıyaman Province on the morning of 8 February and lasted four days until 12 February. A Taiwan-funded civic center in Reyhanlı, founded in 2020 for refugees of the Syrian civil war, turned itself into a shelter for earthquake victims.

The Taiwanese government announced a donation of $2 million in disaster relief and later helped with the transportation of relief supplies to Turkey. President Tsai Ing-wen and other top officials also announced their donations of a month's salary to Turkey. Government-designated accounts collected over NT$1.18 billion ($38.4 million). The Turkish Trade Office in Taipei teamed up with the Tzu Chi Foundation to begin receiving donations of new winter clothing and other necessities on 9 February. The donations reached the office's capacity to handle the supplies on the third day, and the first batch of the donations arrived in Turkey on 12 February.

== Aid from organizations ==
=== Arab League ===
Arab League secretary-general Ahmed Aboul Gheit called for international assistance to help those affected by "this humanitarian catastrophe".

=== European Union (EU) ===
EU response on the 2023 Turkey-Syria earthquake, EU Emergency Response Coordination Centre (ERCC)

President of the European Council Charles Michel and President of the European Commission Ursula von der Leyen announced that the European Union was ready to deliver earthquake assistance in Turkey and Syria. The EU's European Civil Protection Mechanism, in which Turkey participates despite not being a member of the EU, was activated at the request of Turkey. The EU dispatched thirty-one rescue teams and five medical teams from 23 member states to Turkey, committed €3 million and €3.5 million to Turkey and Syria respectively, and announced a donor conference to raise money. The Copernicus Programme was also activated to provide emergency mapping services and other assistance.

=== North Atlantic Treaty Organization (NATO) ===
NATO secretary-general Jens Stoltenberg said that member countries were mobilizing support. The Strategic Airlift Capability was used to transport search and rescue equipment. NATO deployed "fully equipped semi-permanent shelter facilities" to house displaced persons in Turkey. Flags at NATO headquarters were also lowered to half-mast. A vessel carrying the first 600 of 1,000 containers for temporary housing left Taranto, Italy for Turkey to accommodate at least 4,000 people.

=== United Nations (UN) ===
Several United Nations agencies announced coordinated responses to the disaster, including UNDAC, OCHA, UNHCR, UNICEF and IOM. The World Health Organization's Regional Director for Europe, Hans Kluge, said the organization's regional offices were assisting international efforts to transport medicine and relief equipment. The UN released $25 million from its emergency fund for humanitarian assistance in Turkey and Syria. A second $25 million grant was released for relief efforts in Syria. UN sent humanitarian aid to Syria through Turkey via the Bab al-Hawa Border Crossing. Since then, 65 trucks have crossed, carrying health and nutrition items and other vital relief supplies for more than two million people. On 14 February, the UN appealed for €396 million to help survivors in Syria.

=== World Bank ===
The World Bank said it would provide US$1.78 billion in aid for Turkey to support the relief and recovery process. "We are providing immediate assistance and preparing a rapid assessment of the urgent and massive needs on the ground," said World Bank President David Malpass.

=== Companies ===
- Baykar donated 1,000 residences to the victims.
- İşbank (including its subsidiaries) pledged ₺10 billion (€495 million) for recovery, including ₺1 billion (€49.5 million) worth donation to AFAD, supporting re-construction of affected cities by ₺1.75 billion (€86.6 million) and removing off the debts of victims.
- Koç Holding pledged ₺2 billion (€99 million) for recovery.
- Sabancı Holding announced that the aid they have given to date has reached to ₺2 billion (€99 million) and noted that they will continue to support the recovery efforts.
- Allianz donated €6 million for recovery.
- Mercedes-Benz Group announced that they will donate €1 million to German Red Cross.
- SOCAR Turkey created ₺55 million (€2.7 million) worth charity fund including donations of ₺6.4 million (€318,000) to AFAD and ₺2 million (€99,390) to Ahbap.
- SunExpress, joint venture of Lufthansa and Turkish Airlines, operated free of charge flights to and from affected cities in order to assist the transportation of aid, USAR teams and evacuation of affected people. Turkish Airlines and Pegasus Airlines also operated such flights.
- Inditex donated €3 million to Turkish Red Crescent. The company also donated 500,000 piece of clothing to Turkish Red Crescent and AFAD.
- Chobani, pledged to donate $2 million (€1.87 million). Amazon pledged to donate $600,000 (€562,260) to humanitarian organizations and to supply emergency cold weather equipment.
- Deutsche Telekom announced that they will waive fees arise from calls with Turkey and Syria until 15 February 2023. The company also pledged to donate €1 million to Aktion Deutschland Hilft.
- Siemens AG and Siemens Healthineers donated €1 million.
- The Sun raised £1 million (€1.1 million) for Turkey and Syria (including Tesco's £100,000 (€112,000) and Marks & Spencer's £50,000 (€56,000) worth donations).
- Apple Inc. CEO Tim Cook expressed condolences and announced that they would donate to relief organisations to support recovery efforts. Google CEO Sundar Pichai also announced that they will support the relief organisations for recovery.
- Boeing donated $500,000 (€467,970) to American Red Cross.
- IKEA donated €10 million to Doctors Without Borders for its work in Syria.
- Black Sea Trade and Development Bank donated €50,000 to AFAD.
- ICBC Turkey pledged ₺1 million (€49,600) in financial aid.
- The Pokémon Company International donated $200,000 to GlobalGiving's Turkey and Syria Earthquake Relief Fund.
- Caterpillar Inc. donated $400,000 to earthquake victims in Turkey and Syria via the Red Cross.
- The Caribbean branch of the British multinational professional services firm, PwC donated US$60,000 for post-earthquake recovery in Turkey and Syria.

=== Other ===
- Aid to the Church in Need provided around 1 million dollars in two aid packages announced immediately after the earthquake, and in October 2023. Much of the organisation's support went to restoring infrastructure and evaluating the structural damage to houses belonging to members of the Christian community in cities such as Aleppo, Homs and Lattakia.
- Ahbap, a Turkish NGO, raised more than ₺1 billion (€49.5 million) in financial aid campaign.
- Caritas Internationalis raised money.
- Islamic Relief launched a £20 million global appeal to provide emergency aid including food, medical supplies, shelter and other items to meet immediate needs of those who have been affected by the earthquakes in Syria and Turkey.
- Muhammadiyah, an Islamic organization from Indonesia, sent 29 medical teams consisting of doctors, nurses, pharmacists and psychologists to help treat victims affected by the earthquake in Turkey.
- The World Jewish Relief charity launched an emergency appeal to provide emergency aid to Turkey. The Jewish Federation also raised money for Turkey. Over 50 Jewish communities donated to earthquake-relief efforts.
- International Rescue Committee launched an integrated response to support affected communities in both countries. It include cash and essential items, such as household kits, dignity kits for women and girls, and hygiene supplies including towels and blankets as well as essential health services in affected areas.
- Doctors Without Borders (MSF), already present and operating in Syria due to the Syrian civil war, scaled up its response in north Syria, providing emergency medical care to victims in the first hours after the main shocks and continuing thereafter. MSF also announced that they stand ready to provide assistance in Turkey, conditional on agreement from the Turkish government. MSF received a €10 million donation from the IKEA Foundation.
- The Union of European Football Associations (UEFA) and their Foundation for Children made a €200,000 donation.
- Malteser International, the aid agency of the Sovereign Military Order of Malta, sent a rescue team to Gaziantep, Turkey, while the Order of Malta's Hungary relief service organised relief operations in Aleppo, Syria. Malteser International also allocated €400,000 in emergency relief.
- Samaritan's Purse sent 52 bed field hospitals to Antakya, Turkey. The organization also pledged to send more than 100 medical and technical staff to the site to support the injured and in critical condition.
- World Central Kitchen set up mobile kitchens throughout earthquake-hit areas in Turkey and Syria.
- An anonymous Pakistani-American businessman reportedly donated $30m to the relief effort. The donation was confirmed by Turkey's ambassador to the United States.
- Lutheran World Relief launched an appeal for Turkey. Catholic Relief Services launched an appeal for Turkey and Syria.
- Oxfam created an emergency fund for Turkey and Syria.
- International Medical Corps launched an appeal for Turkey and Syria.
- The International Federation of Red Cross and Red Crescent Societies launched two Emergency Appeals in response to the devastating earthquakes.
- Liga Nacional de Fútbol Profesional (LaLiga) joined the fundraising effort to support the Spanish Emergency Committee's Every Minute Counts campaign to help the victims in affected countries.
- Hezbollah sent a humanitarian aid convoy to the earthquake victims in Syria.
- Gift of the Givers, a South African NGO, provided disaster relief as well as medical and search and rescue teams.
- Buddhist Tzu Chi Foundation provided winterisation items and cash cards in Turkey and collaborated with Dünya Doktorları Derneği (Doctors of the World Turkey) to assist in Syria.
- Tawakkol Karman Foundation built 50 units of temporary shelters for victims at earthquake-raged areas in Turkey.
- Hafezzi Charitable Society of Bangladesh also joined the humanitarian aid efforts.
- Al-Markazul Islami dispatched 2,000 body bags from Bangladesh.

== Insufficient aid to affected areas in Syria ==
On 12 February, UN aid chief Martin Griffiths said, "We have so far failed the people in northwest Syria. They rightly feel abandoned. Looking for international help that hasn't arrived". Human Rights Watch stated on 15 February that the lack of appropriate humanitarian support caused by Bashar al-Assad's policy of "obstructing aid" has proved to be "deadly" for the earthquake-stricken people of Idlib. Investigative reports by free-lance journalists revealed that the Syrian government had deliberately obstructed aid to opposition-held areas in the North-West, which was the worst-struck region in the earthquake and had over 4,100 deaths.

As of 13 February, most reported Syrian deaths were in parts of the north-west not controlled by the government. The affected area is controlled by many different organizations, and they sometimes obstruct aid from other organizations. There was not enough modern rescue equipment to get people out from under the rubble before they died, and international aid has been obstructed by checkpoints. Undersecretary of the NRC, Jan Egeland stated: "The most earthquake-stricken area of Syria is in the north-west.. We need full and free access across front lines, and full and free distribution."

Syrian government officials and state-run media blamed United States and European Union sanctions against Syria for the lack of humanitarian aid and hampering rescue. On 10 February, Syrian President Bashar al-Assad criticized western countries, adding that they "have no regard for the human condition." Turkey opened the Al-Salameh and Al-rai border crossings during the first week of the earthquakes; which enabled independent and non-governmental relief organizations to send aid to North-West Syria.

As of 11 February, almost no international aid had reached the area controlled by Hay'at Tahrir al-Sham (HTS), and they have refused to accept aid from the Syrian government. As of 13 February Bab al-Hawa is the only border crossing from Turkey the UN is allowed to send aid through: the others were blocked by earlier Security council vetos by Russia and China. The UN secretary general, António Guterres, was urging the security council to authorise the opening of new cross-border aid points between Turkey and Syria, but it was unclear whether that would overcome past objections. Before a security council meeting on the crisis, however, diplomats said no draft resolution had yet been circulated.

Syrian government's policy of besieging North-West Syria; which blockades the supply of food, medicines and other humanitarian supplies, has led to a deterioration of the crisis in Idlib. Hayat al-Tahrir al-Sham rebel militia that governs Idlib has objected to approving aid sent only through Damascus, accusing the regime of weaponizing humanitarian relief. Growing calls for the supply of UN aid to the Northwest through other border-crossings have been vetoed by Russia in the Security Council, claiming that such measures erode the sovereignty of the Syrian government.

Raed al-Saleh, chief of Syrian Civil Defence, strongly rebuked the UN for its negligence and delay in responding to the rescue efforts:

"Let me be clear: The White Helmets received no support from the United Nations during the most critical moments of the rescue operations.. The UN's failure to respond quickly to this catastrophe is shameful. When I asked the UN why help had failed to arrive in time, the answer I received was bureaucracy. In the face of one of the deadliest catastrophes to strike the world in years, it seems the UN's hands were tied by red tape."
