= Abd El-Razzak El-Sanhuri =

Egyptian legal scholar (1895-1971)

‘Abd el-Razzāq el-Sanhūrī
- عبد الرزاق السنهوري
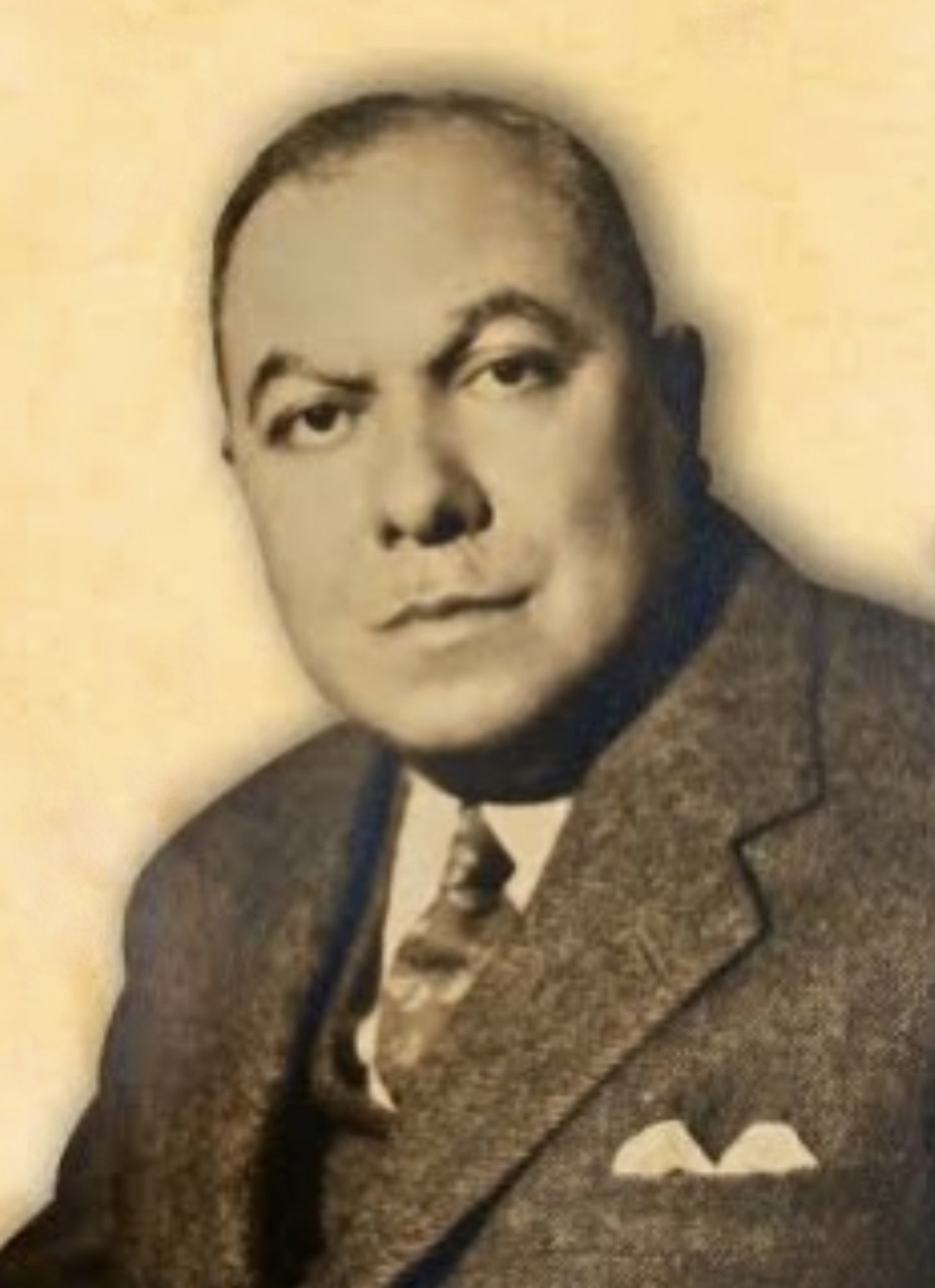

President of the Egyptian Council of State
- In office 3 March 1949 – 29 March 1954
- President: Himself
- Preceded by: Kāmil Pasha Mursī
- Succeeded by: ‘Alī al-Sayyid

Minister of Education
- In office 24 February 1945 – 15 February 1946
- Preceded by: Mohammed Hussein Heikal
- Succeeded by: Muḥammad Ḥasan al-‘Ashmawi
- In office 9 December 1946 – 2 March 1949
- Preceded by: Muḥammad Ḥasan al-‘Ashmawi
- Succeeded by: Aḥmad Mursī Badr

Under-Secretary of Education
- In office January 1942 – March 1942

Dean of the Law Faculty at the Egyptian National University (Cairo University)
- In office 8 October 1936 – 15 October 1937

Personal details
- Born: August 11, 1895 Alexandria, Egypt
- Died: July 21, 1971 (aged 75) Alexandria, Egypt
- Party: Saadist Institutional Party (1937–1949)
- Education: Khedival School of Law, Cairo; University of Lyon (PhD)

Abd el-Razzak el-Sanhuri or ‘Abd al-Razzāq el-Sanhūrī (Arabic: عبد الرزاق السنهوري; 11 August 1895 – 21 July 1971) was an Egyptian jurist, law professor, judge and politician. He is best remembered as the primary author of the revised Egyptian Civil Code of 1948. El-Sanhuri's multi-volume masterwork, Al-Wasit fi sharh al-qanun al-madani al-jadid, a comprehensive commentary on the Egyptian Civil Code of 1948 and on civil law more generally, published during 1952-1970, remains in print and is highly regarded in legal and juristic professions throughout the Arab world. El-Sanhuri was Minister of Education in the Cabinet of Mahmoud El Nokrashy Pasha from 1945-1946 and again from late 1946 to 1948.

He was subsequently appointed as President of the Egyptian Council of State. El-Sanhuri's tenure as President of the Council of State lasted until 1954, when he was dismissed by coercion. He has been described as "a personality of unique embroidery, never to reoccur". An avowed advocate of Arab unity, el-Sanhuri was notably active in the legal and institutional reforms of different Arab countries throughout most of his adult life. He presided over a committee which drafted the Iraqi Civil Code, while at the same time serving as dean of the Baghdad Law School, from 1935 to 1937. He also contributed to a drafting project of a Syrian civil code throughout the early 1940s. El-Sanhuri also drafted various public and private laws of Kuwait, Sudan, Libya and Bahrain.

== Early life and education ==
El-Sanhuri was born on 11 August 1895 in Alexandria. His father, who, by the time of el-Sanhuri's birth, had lost his fortune, worked as a 'minor' employee at the Alexandria Municipal Council. El-Sanhuri had six other siblings. His father's passing in 1900 aggravated the family's destitution. El-Sanhuri obtained his secondary school certificate from the Abbasiyya in 1913 and then joined the Khedival School of Law (later the Faculty of Law at Cairo University) where he obtained his BA in 1917. He was subsequently assigned to the position of Deputy Prosecutor at the National Court of Mansura which he retained until 1919, when his incitement of riots during the Egyptian Revolution of 1919 led to his dismissal. After this, el-Sanhuri briefly worked as a teacher in Madrasat al-qada ash-shariyya. In 1921, el-Sanhuri moved to Lyon, France to obtain his doctorate. During that time, he undertook research under the French jurist Édouard Lambert. El-Sanhuri returned to Cairo in 1926 to take up a position as a teacher of civil law at his alma mater.

== Cairo and Baghdad in the 1930s ==
After spending eight years as a teacher of civil law at the Faculty of Law in Cairo, el-Sanhuri moved to Baghdad in 1935, where he became dean of the Baghdad School of Law. In February 1936, Rashid Ali al-Gaylani, then the Minister of Interior, put together a committee of jurists for the drafting of an Iraqi Civil Code, which he tasked el-Sanhuri with presiding over. Interruptions brought about by the 1936 Iraqi coup d'état and strong opposition from Islamists brought the project to a halt. In 1937, el-Sanhuri returned to Cairo. Around this time, he interacted with secessionists of the Wafd Party and joined the Saadist Institutional Party.

== The Egyptian Civil Code ==
In late 1938, after two drafting committees were abandoned, the Egyptian Minister of Justice Aḥmad al-Khashaba determined that drafting of a civil code would be "best accomplished by two individuals", and proceeded to select el-Sanhuri and his old mentor, Lambert, for the task. The first draft of the Egyptian Civil Code was completed in 1942. Various administrative hold-ups and legislative procedures resulted in the Code being promulgated on 15 October 1949.

== The Iraqi and Syrian civil codes ==
In 1943, el-Sanhuri left Egypt to help draft the civil code of Iraq anew. This time, the attempt at drafting a code was more favourable; an Iraqi Civil Code which combined the Majalla and the Egyptian Civil Code as its sources was promulgated in 1951 (but only came into force in 1953). El-Sanhuri also visited Syria, at which time he contributed to the drafting of a civil code. His contribution, however, was cut short by his return to Cairo in 1948. Moreover, the articles which he drafted were eventually dropped in favour of the draft which, at the instructions of Husni al-Za'im, more or less mirrored the Egyptian Civil Code.

== President of the Council of State ==
In March 1949, el-Sanhuri accepted the position of presidency at the Egyptian Council of State. His tenure coincided with the Egyptian revolution of 1952. Power struggles between Mohamed Naguib and Gamal Abdel Nasser eventually brought the Council of State to the attention of the military. During March 1954, when the Egyptian Bar Association made demands for a return to civil government, el-Sanhuri, whose opposition to military rule had by that time become clear, was forcibly dismissed. Widespread demonstrations ensued. The Revolutionary Command Council insisted that the transition system of governance would stay in place. According to Farhat Ziadeh, a mob instigated by "some army elements" assaulted el-Sanhuri. One explanation put the assault to a publication by Al-Akhbār newspaper claiming that the Council of State "was about to issue decrees against the Revolution . . . (and) it had been rumoured that Dr el-Sanhuri was to become Prime Minister for the four months until the election of a constituent assembly". When Nasser called at the hospital in which el-Sanhuri was receiving treatment for the injuries he sustained from the assault, el-Sanhuri refused to see him. It is often claimed that el-Sanhuri was unable to leave Egypt following this incident. It is unclear whether el-Sanhuri was placed under any house arrest. He is known to have briefly resided in Kuwait during 1959–60 to assist Kuwaiti legislators and politicians in different legislative projects. It has also been suggested that he visited Libya once again around that time (having briefly visited it for the first time in 1953) to assist in drafting and legislative exercises.

== Later life ==
Most of el-Sanhuri's later life was dedicated to the writing and publication of further volumes of Al-Wasīṭ. Nevertheless, in 1959, he was appointed, to Nasser's displeasure, as the director of the legal department at the Arab League's Institute of Arab Research and Studies (IARS) in Cairo, now administered by the Arab League Educational, Cultural and Scientific Organization. El-Sanhuri taught a course in comparative Islamic and Western law at the IARS. In 1970, on advice of Cairo University, Alexandria University and Ain Shams University, the Egyptian state awarded el-Sanhuri its prize for social sciences and culture. El-Sanhuri died on 21 July 1971 at his home in Alexandria, and was buried in Heliopolis, Cairo.

== Method ==
El-Sanhuri's major contribution to modern Arab legal and intellectual thought is his method of modernizing Islamic fiqh and sharia by reconciling rules and laws within Islamic Madhhabs with modern European jurisprudential concepts. The reason he resorted to European civil law and Western jurisprudence was not on identitarian or colonial premises, rather, it was on account of their highly elaborate and intellectualised character. This reconciliation is predicated upon an important distinction. According to el-Sanhuri, the process of elaborating law and dispensing justice can only rightly operate when the ulama and the jurists are substantively distinguished: whereas the ulama are responsible for elaborating ibadat, that part of Islamic law which pertains to rituals and worship, and must therefore be confined to the religious parts of fiqh, the jurists proper concern themselves with the temporal and particular (i.e. variable) parts of fiqh and sharia. This would allow jurists, judges and law-makers to keep 'modern' Arab justice from being wholly subordinated to Islamic theology while drawing on Islamic legal principles all the while. In this way, justice would remain faithful to its historic roots but with an invariable view of reaching humanistic ends; particularly when state legislation, the sharia and traditional customs all fail to find a solution to one or more legal or juridical problems. The tenets of El-Sanhuri's philosophy are unity and experience; as he explains in Le Califat, a careful balance must be achieved between both:

It will be prudent, in reducing modernized Muslim law to legislative expression, to have recourse to formulas flexible enough to allow for the adaptation of the system by the courts to the changing needs of court practice through following the general guidelines set out by doctrine. It will also be desirable that a relative unity of vision guides the legislators of different Muslim countries, which will happen by the very force of the pursuit [of sources], since they will draw all the first inspirations of their legislative work from the same source, Muslim doctrine; but it will of course also be necessary to take into account the particularities of the economic life of each country... The existence of a common ground of ideas between the various [jurisdictional] laws would render conflicts of laws less acute, widen the field of activity of lawyers in Muslim countries, and give more solidity to the creative work of the jurisprudence of the courts, which, in each of the Muslim countries, could benefit from the judicial experiments carried out by the related case law.

== Academic commentary ==
One commentator argued that el-Sanhuri's codes reflected a "hodgepodge of socialist doctrine and sociological jurisprudence." Other commentators have pointed out that his place in the legal history of the modern Middle East is nevertheless secure; indeed, his Al-Wasit "adorns the bookshelves of many an Arab law firm, even in countries where the Egyptian Civil Code is not law".

== Works ==
- Les restrictions contracluelles a la liberle individuelle de travail dans la jurisprudence anglaise, Paris: Marcel Biard, 1925.
- Le Califat, Paris: Librairie Orientaliste Paul Geuthner, 1926.
- Al-'Aqd al-ijar. Cairo, 1930.
- Nazariyyat al-'Aqd. Cairo, 1934
- Al-Mujiz fi al-nazariyya al-'amma lil-iltizamat fi qanun al-madani al-misri. Cairo, 1936.
- Al-Wasīṭ fī sharḥ al-qānūn al-madanī al-jadīd. (10 volumes) Cairo, 1952–1970.

== Bibliography ==
- Hill, Enid, Al-Sanhuri and Islamic Law, (1987), ISBN 977-424-170-3.
- Bechor, Guy, The Sanhuri Code, and the Emergence of Modern Arab Civil Law (1932 to 1949), Brill, (2007), ISBN 90-04-15878-2, ISSN 1384-1130.
- Riles, Annelise (ed.), Rethinking the Masters of Comparative Law, (2001), ISBN 1-84113-289-6.
- Shalakany, Amr, Between Identity and Redistribution: Sanhuri, Genealogy and the Will to Islamise, in Islamic Law and Society, Vol. 8(2), 2001, ISSN 0928-9380.
