= Iraqi Penal Code =

Statutory law of Iraq

The Iraqi Penal Code is the statutory law of Iraq. The 1969 Penal Code serves as the basis for current Iraq law. The original Arabic-language version of the law can be accessed through the Iraqi Legal Database.
