= Grand-Ducal Fire and Rescue Corps of Luxembourg =

Corps grand-ducal d'incendie et de secours

Operational area
- Country: Luxembourg
- Address: 3 Boulevard de Kockelscheuer, L-1821 Luxembourg, Grand Duchy of Luxembourg

Agency overview
- Established: 2018; 8 years ago
- Commissioner: Paul Schroeder

Facilities and equipment
- Divisions: 4

The Grand-Ducal Fire and Rescue Corps (in French: Corps grand-ducal d'incendie et de secours, or CGDIS) has been the fire brigade of the Grand Duchy of Luxembourg since 1 July 2018. This replaced the previous federation of local fire services made up of volunteer firefighters, communal rescue services, civil protection organisations and the fire and rescue services of the city of Luxembourg and the Luxembourg air navigation administration (for Luxembourg Airport), both made up of professional firefighters.

== Ranks ==
Higher cadre of professional and volunteer fire fighters Cadre supérieur des pompiers volontaires et professionnels
Insignia								
French	Directeur général	Colonel	Lieutenant-colonel	Major	Capitaine	Lieutenant 1ère classe	Lieutenant	Lieutenant-aspirant
English	Director general	Colonel	Lieutenant colonel	Major	Captain	Lieutenant 1st class	Lieutenant	Aspirant lieutenant

Middle cadre of professional and volunteer fire fighters Cadre moyen des pompiers volontaires et professionnels
Insignia					
French	Sous-lieutenant	Adjudant-major	Adjudant-chef	Adjudant	Adjudant-aspirant
English	Sub-lieutenant	Chief warrant officer	Master warrant officer	Warrant officer	Aspirant warrant officer

Basic cadre of professional and volunteer fire fighters Cadre de base des pompiers volontaires et professionnels
Insignia									
French	Sergent-major 1ère classe	Sergent-major	Sergent-chef	Sergent	Caporal-chef 1ère classe	Caporal-chef	Caporal	Brigadier	Brigadier-aspirant
English	Sergeant major 1st class	Sergeant major	Master sergeant	Sergeant	Master corporal 1st class	Master corporal	Corporal	Brigadier	Aspirant brigadier

=== Former Ranks ===
Officers Officiers Offizéier
Insignia								
French	Colonel	Lieutenant Colonel 1er degré	Lieutenant Colonel 2e degré	Commandant	Capitaine Commandant	Capitaine	Lieutenant 1ère classe	Lieutenant
Luxembourgish	Kolonell	Lieutenant Kolonell Éischt Grad	Lieutenant Kolonell Zweet Grad	Kommandant	Kapitän Kommandant	Kapitän	Lieutenant Éischt Klass	Lieutenant
English	Colonel	Lieutenant colonel 1st class	Lieutenant colonel 2nd class	Commandant	Captain commandant	Captain	Lieutenant 1st class	Lieutenant

NCOs Sous-officiers Ënneroffizéier
Insignia			
French	Adjudant-chef	Adjudant	Sergent
Luxembourgish	Adjudant Chef	Adjudant	Sergent
English	Chief warrant officer	Warrant officer	Sergeant

Enlisted Hommes du rang Pompjeeën
Insignia				
French	Caporal-chef	Caporal	Pompier première classe	Pompier-aspirant
Luxembourgish	Korporal Chef	Korporal	Pompjeen Éischt Klass	Pompjeen Aspirant
English	Master corporal	Corporal	Firefighter first class	Aspirant firefighter
