= Egyptian Civil Code =

Civil code of Egypt

The Egyptian Civil Code is the primary source of civil law for Egypt.

The first version of Egyptian Civil Code was written in 1949 containing 1149 articles. The prime author of the 1949 code was the jurist Abd El-Razzak El-Sanhuri, who received assistance from Dean Edouard Lambert of the University of Lille. Perhaps due to Lambert's influence, the 1949 code followed the French civil law model. The code focuses on the regulation of business and commerce, and does not include any provisions regarding family law. El-Sanhuri purposely left out family law and succession to set it apart from the Turkish civil code.

Article 1 of the code provides that, “in the absence of any applicable legislation, the judge shall decide according to the custom and failing the custom, according to the principles of Islamic Law. In the absence of these principles, the judge shall have recourse to natural law and the rules of equity.” Despite this invocation of Islamic law, one commentator has argued that 1949 code reflected a "hodgepodge of socialist doctrine and sociological jurisprudence."

The Egyptian Civil Code has been the source of law and inspiration for numerous other Middle Eastern jurisdictions, including pre-dictatorship kingdoms of Libya and Iraq (both drafted by El-Sanhuri himself and a team of native jurists under his guidance), in addition to Jordan (completed in 1976, after his death) Bahrain (2001), as well as Qatar (1971) (these last two merely inspired by his notions), and the commercial code of Kuwait (drafted by El-Sanhuri). When Sudan drafted its own civil code in 1970, it was in large part copied from the Egyptian Civil Code with slight modifications. The Saudi Civil Code, introduced in December 2023, is also modelled after the Egyptian Civil Code. Today, all Mashriq Arab nations possessing modern civil codes, with the exception of Lebanon and Oman, are based fully or partly on the Egyptian Civil Code.

== Historical background ==
Egypt began legal reform in 1875 when it gained independence from the Ottoman Empire in judicial and legal matters, which led to the establishment of the Mixed Courts to deal with foreigners and national courts. This necessitated a need for a set of laws that had secular influence. When Egypt obtained the needed international agreement for the union of its legal system in 1937, it started to draw up a new series of comprehensive codes. Most of this effort was overseen by the Egyptian jurist Abd El-Razzak El-Sanhuri. The code was originally drafted in 1942, but went through several revisions before its passage in 1949.

Its author, Al-Sanhuri, stayed loyal to his vision of having judges rule in accordance with the code itself before considering using Shari’a, which had not been codified for a long time. For the first time in the modern history of the Arab Middle East, the Shari’a would be used to back up a secular document. With the civil code as the principal source of law, all Shari’a courts were abolished. The writing of the civil code was an attempt on the part of Al-Sanhuri to modernize Islamic law by adopting ideas from western civil law, a concept greatly supported by the elite members of Egyptian society. Westernization meant confining certain Islamic law to mostly matters dealing with personal status such as marriage, divorce, and inheritance.

British colonization led to some shift to the common law, but the common law had little long-term impact on the legal systems of many countries that fell under British rule where there was an existing codified system. Thus civil law, mostly of French origins, now prevails throughout the Middle East, and the occasional remnants of common law are likely not to survive (with the exception of Israeli law which remains largely based on common law as it pertains to non-private matters). As a result, the modern legal systems of Middle Eastern countries share the basic features of French law, such as relying on complete and logical statements of the law in codes as official sources of law, keeping a sharp division between public and private law and between commercial and private law.

== See also ==
- Cairo Declaration on Human Rights in Islam
- Application of sharia law by country
- Egyptian law

== Bibliography ==
- Bechor, Guy. The Sanhuri Code, and the Emergence of Modern Arab Civil Law (1932 To 1949), (2007), ISBN 9789004158788.
- Hoyle, Mark, The Mixed Courts of Egypt, (1991), ISBN 1-85333-321-2.
