= Austrian Forces Disaster Relief Unit =

The Austrian Forces Disaster Relief Unit (short AFDRU) is an Urban Search and Rescue (USAR) and disaster relief unit of the Austrian federal armed forces (the Bundesheer).

== History ==
It was created in 1990 in response to various disasters, especially the earthquake in Armenia in 1988.

AFDRU is specifically designed to be deployed in other countries. The unit can be airlifted within 10 hours of receiving orders, and carries enough equipment to operate on its own for two weeks.

== Deployments ==
The unit has been active in many disasters, in particular in Iran during the 2003 earthquake and in Sri Lanka following the tsunami disaster in 2004.
