= Annelise Riles =

American anthropology and law professor

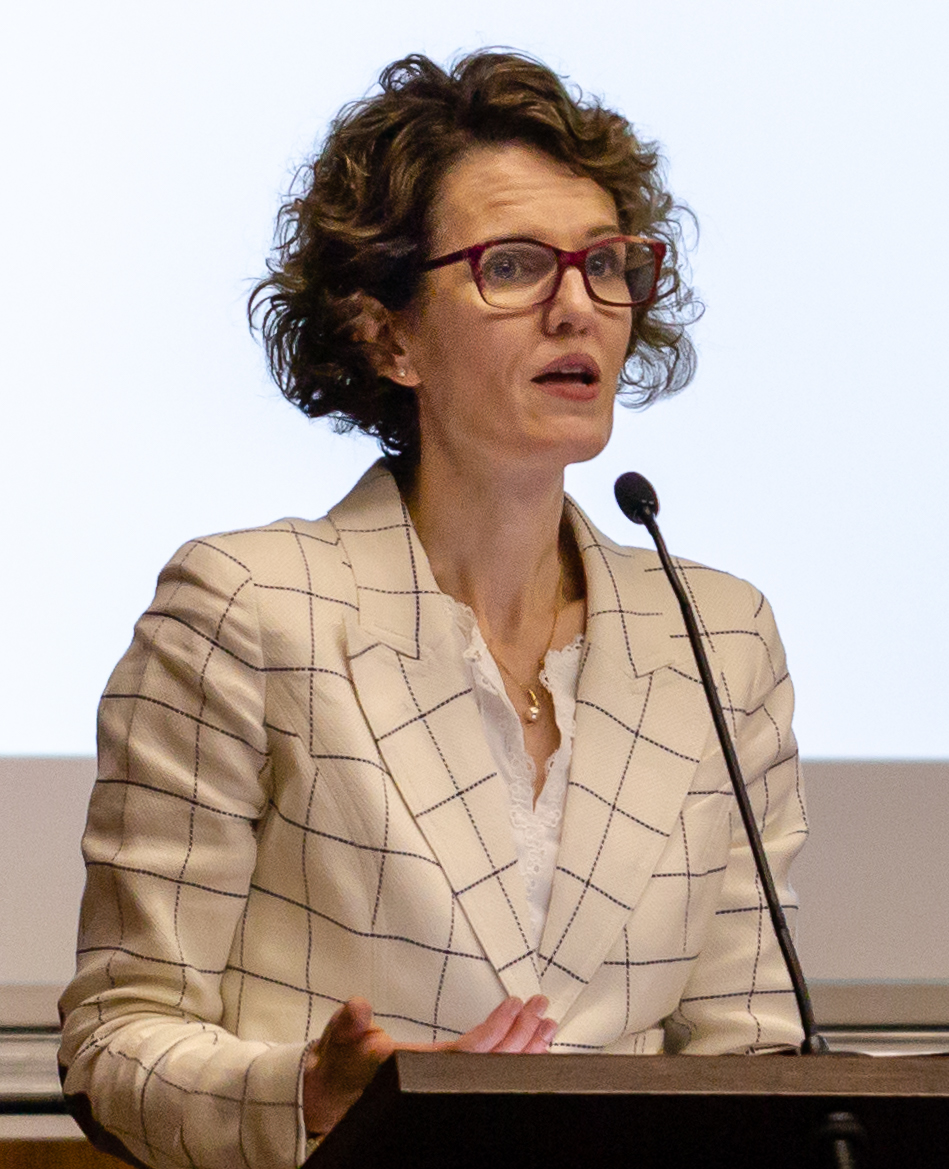
Annelise Riles at a conference of Positive Money Europe in Brussels (23 May 2018).

Annelise Riles is an interdisciplinary anthropologist and legal scholar.

She is the associate provost for global affairs and a professor of law and anthropology at Northwestern University.

Riles is also the founder and director of Meridian-180, a multilingual forum for transformative leadership. Its global membership of 800+ thought leaders in academia, government and business work together to generate ideas and guidance.

== Education and career ==
Riles received an AB degree from Princeton University in 1988. She received an MSc degree from London School of Economics in 1990 after she received the Marshall Scholarship. She received a JD degree from Harvard Law School in 1993, and a PhD from University of Cambridge in 1996. She was associated with the American Bar Foundation, in 1996-97 as a postdoctoral fellow, and from 1997 to 2002 as a research fellow. She also was a lecturer at the University of the South Pacific in 1995. She was associated with Cornell University beginning in 2001, as a visiting professor. In 2002 she became a professor of the Law School and the Department of Anthropology, and director of the Clarke Program in East Asian Law and Culture. In 2007 she became the Jack G. Clarke '52 Professor of Far Eastern Legal Studies.

== Books ==
- Financial Citizenship: Experts, Publics & The Politics of Central Banking (Cornell University, 2018)
- The Network Inside Out (University of Michigan Press, 2000)(awarded the 2000-2001 Certificate of Merit by the American Society of International Law)
- Rethinking the Masters of Comparative Law (ed.)(Oxford, Hart Publishing, 2001)
- Documents: Artifacts of Modern Knowledge (ed.)(University of Michigan Press, 2006)
- Collateral Knowledge: Legal Reasoning in the Global Financial Markets (University of Chicago Press, 2011)
- Retooling: Professionalism for the Future (with Hiro Miyazaki and Yuji Genda)(NTT Press, 2014)
