= Iraqi Legal Database =

The Iraqi Legal Database (ILD) is the first comprehensive and electronic legal database to be created in the Arab region. The project to create the ILD was launched in 2004 by the United Nations Development Programme (UNDP), through its Programme on Governance in the Arab Region (POGAR). The project was implemented in cooperation with the Iraqi High Judicial Council.

== See also ==
- United Nations Development Programme
