= Iraqi Red Crescent Society =

- جمعية الهلال الأحمر العراقي
- Formation: 1932
- Type: International organization
- Purpose: Humanitarian
- Headquarters: Baghdad, Iraq
- Website: ircs.org.iq

The Iraqi Red Crescent Society (Arabic: جمعية الهلال الأحمر العراقي, romanized: Jamʻīyat al-Hilāl al-Aḥmar al-ʻIrāqī) was founded in 1932, and it has its headquarters in Baghdad. It is an independent, international humanitarian society that works to provide non-discriminatory medical aid to people under any and all circumstances. Besides giving first aid, they also train volunteers in first aid. As of 2024 the president is Yaseen Ahmed Abbass.

== See also ==
- International Red Cross and Red Crescent Movement
