= George Owen =

George Owen may refer to:

- George Owen (physician) (1499–1558), royal physician
- George Owen of Henllys (1552–1613), Welsh antiquarian, author, and naturalist
- George Owen (herald) (died 1665), Welsh officer of arms, son of George Owen of Henllys
- George W. Owen (1796–1837), U. S. representative from Alabama
- George Owen (ice hockey) (1901–1986), ice hockey defenseman
- George Owen (footballer) (1865–1922), Welsh footballer
- George Owen (cyclist) (1893–1966), British cyclist
- George Vale Owen (1869–1931), Church of England clergyman and spiritualist
- George Owen (priest), Welsh Anglican priest
- George P. Owen, secretary of the Singapore Cricket Club and big-game hunter
- George Owen Harry, Welsh antiquarian

== See also ==
- George Owens (disambiguation)
