= Anthony Jones =

Anthony or Tony Jones may refer to:

== Music ==
- Anthony "Sooty" Jones (1949–1985), American rock bass guitarist with the English band Humble Pie
- Anthony Linden Jones (born 1959), Australian composer, conductor, and performer
- Anthony M. Jones (born 1982), American pop record producer and songwriter for EMI Music Publishing
- Anthony Armstrong Jones (1949–1996), American country music singer
- Tony Jones (born 1963), English bass guitarist with The Christians

== Sports ==
- Anthony Jones (American football) (born 1960), American football player
- Tiger Jones (American football) (Anthony Keith Jones, born 1982), American arena football player
- Anthony Jones (Australian rules footballer) (born 1974), Australian footballer
- Anthony Windham Jones (1879–1959), Welsh rugby player
- Anthony Jones (sprinter) (born 1955), Barbadian Olympic sprinter
- Anthony Jones (sprinter, born 1971), American sprinter, 1994 All-American for the Illinois Fighting Illini track and field team
- Anthony Jones (basketball, born 1962), American professional basketball player
- Anthony Jones (basketball, born 1967), American basketball player
- Tony Jones (basketball), American professional basketball coach
- Tony Jones (footballer) (1937–1990), English footballer
- Tony Jones (linebacker) (born 1995), American football player
- Tony Jones (offensive tackle) (1966–2021), NFL offensive lineman
- Tony Jones (snooker player) (born 1960), English snooker player
- Tony Jones (wide receiver) (born 1965), former NFL wide receiver
- Tony Jones (wrestler) (1971–2024), American professional wrestler
- Tony Jones Jr. (born 1997), American football running back

== Media ==
- Tony Jones (news journalist) (born 1955), Australian current affairs journalist on Lateline
- Tony Jones (sports journalist) (born 1961), Australian sports reporter with the Nine Network
- Skeery Jones, American radio host

== Fictional ==
- Tony Jones (Magi-Nation), main character of Magi-Nation game and TV show
- Tony Jones (General Hospital), character on American soap opera General Hospital
- Tony Jones, a character in various spoof commercials played by comedian Robert L. Hines

== Other ==
- Anthony Jones (photographer) (born 1962), British photographer
- Anthony Jones (priest) (died 1678), Welsh Anglican priest
- Anthony Jones (technologist), New Orleans post-Katrina city director of management information services
- Anthony Jones (shooting victim) (died 2010), Jamaican visitor shot in Belize
- Anthony R. Jones (born 1948), U.S. Army general
- Tony Jones (arts administrator) (born 1944), Welsh retired arts administrator and former sculptor
- Tony Jones (Australian sculptor) (born 1944)
- Tony Jones (backpacker) (born 1962), Western Australian who disappeared in Queensland
- Tony Jones (theologian) (born 1968), American theologian involved in the emerging church movement
- Tony Jones, Moderate Party of Rhode Island politician
- Van Jones (Anthony Kapel Jones, born 1968), American environmental advocate, civil rights activist, attorney, and former aide to Barack Obama

== See also ==
- Antony Armstrong-Jones, 1st Earl of Snowdon (1930–2017), photographer, film-maker and life peer
- Anthony Whitworth-Jones (born 1945), opera director
- Tony Ray-Jones (1941–1972), British photographer
