= SCDF =

SCDF may refer to:

- Singapore Civil Defence Force, an emergency service in Singapore under the Ministry of Home Affairs
- Sacred Congregation for the Doctrine of the Faith, a Congregation of the Roman Curia
