= Annie Dorothea Caroline Owen =

Annie Dorothea Caroline Owen (née Earnshaw; 1857 — 28 January 1927) was the first female motorist in British Malaya and a founder of the Ladies' Lawn Tennis Club in Singapore.

== Life ==
Owen married George Mildmay Dare in 1877. In 1884, she co-founded the Ladies Lawn Tennis Club in Singapore. She was also a singer and a dancer and frequently took part in musical and theatrical performances.

In 1905, she imported a motorcar from England, becoming the fourth person in Singapore to own a car, after B. Frost, Charles Burton Buckley and William Kennedy. Kennedy gifted Owen his license plate, and she became the first woman in British Malaya to drive a car. She then taught Hassan Mohamed to drive. He then became the first chauffeur in Singapore. On 15 April 1907, she, her friend and her gardener embarked on a 686-mile road trip across the Malay Peninsula.

Several years after Dare's death in 1907, she married George P. Owen, the secretary of the Singapore Cricket Club. She contributed to One Hundred Years of Singapore. She died on 28 January 1927.
