= Maritime Security Task Force =

The Maritime Security Task Force is a high-readiness standing task force of the Republic of Singapore Navy (RSN) responsible for maritime security operations.

It is structured to work closely with other task forces of the Singapore Armed Forces (SAF), other national maritime agencies, and international partners.

== History ==
The Republic of Singapore Navy's Coastal Command was the national coordinating authority for maritime security since 1988, and it was a navy-level formation that could only muster its own organic assets.

The Coastal Command was restructured in 2004–2005, when the Fearless class vessels were transferred from the Fleet to the Coastal Command. 180 Squadron was also established to analyse shipping data, and monitor the situation at sea from ashore and Accompanying Sea Sea Security Teams placed on merchant ships.

The Coastal Command was subsequently restructured into the Maritime Security Task Force on 19 January 2009, by pulling together both armed forces and national maritime agencies.

It initially consisted of three groups:

- Comprehensive Maritime Awareness Group, which pieces together a comprehensive operational picture, by building information-sharing networks and collating information gathered from national agencies, international partners, and shipping community.
- Operations Group, which comprises operations planners from the Republic of Singapore Navy, Republic of Singapore Air Force, and Singapore Army, who plan and execute operations with an integrated approach.
- Inter-agency Coordination Group, which includes representatives from the Police Coast Guard, SCDF Marine Division, Maritime and Port Authority of Singapore, Immigration and Checkpoints Authority, and Singapore Customs, to ensure seamless coordination in the execution of national-level operations.

== Organisation ==
The Maritime Security Task Force is helmed by a rear admiral, and is operationally responsible to the Chief of Defence Force. It comprises two operational groups, and an information-sharing centre.

=== Operational Groups ===
Sea Security Group is in charge of seaward maritime security activities in Singapore's surrounding waterways. This include regular patrols, boarding and escort activities in the Singapore Strait, as well as maritime surveillance.

Force Protection Group is responsible for against dangers from the sea, and is in charge of defending naval facilities and installations and enforcing security. A quick response force will be dispatched to protect against infiltration and other maritime dangers in the event of a seaward intrusion.

These two operational groups work closely with the Singapore Maritime Crisis Centre to plan and coordinate actions with other national maritime agencies in the case of a maritime incident.

=== Information Fusion Centre ===
The Information Fusion Centre is a multinational maritime security information-sharing and collaboration centre. It has linkages with more than 90 military, maritime and law enforcement agencies from more than 40 countries. It also has more than 160 international liaison officers from 25 countries deployed to Singapore on a rotational basis.

== Exercises ==
The Maritime Security Task Force conducts annual exercises to drill whole-of-government responses to maritime incidents. These include Exercise Highcrest and Exercise Apex.
