= Singapore LLTC Summer Open =

The Singapore LLTC Summer Open was a combined clay court tennis tournament founded in 1885. It was organised by and played at the Ladies' Lawn Tennis Club, Dhoby Green, Singapore until 1906. The club closed in 1932.

The Ladies Lawn Tennis Club was founded in July 1884. It held its first championship tournament in December 1884., that event became known as the Singapore LLTC Winter Tournament. The club closed in the early 1930s due to financial debts.
