= George P. Owen =

Singaporean sportsman

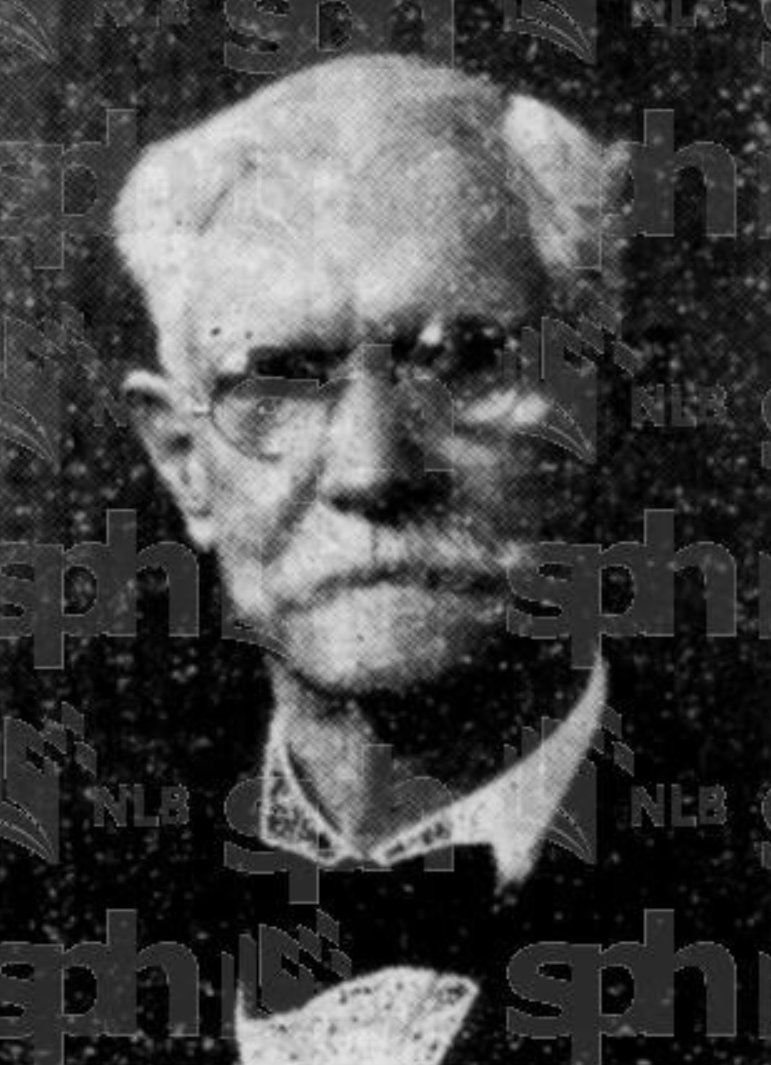
Owen

George P. Owen (1856 – 23 May 1928) was the secretary of the Singapore Cricket Club and the Singapore Turf Club and a big-game hunter.

== Career ==
Owen came to Singapore in 1879. In the following year, he was employed at Adamson, Gilfillan & Co. as an assistant, and became a member of the committee of the Singapore Cricket Club. In 1886, he became the club's secretary, a position he held until 1920. He was also the secretary of the Singapore Turf Club. He won the singles tennis championship in Singapore nine times from 1884 to 1893.

From 1901 to 1904, he served as the superintendent of the Singapore Fire Brigade. He was also a founding member of the Singapore Polo Club and the Singapore Golf Club. He contributed to One Hundred Years of Singapore. He left Singapore and retired to England in December 1920.

== Personal life and death ==
Owen married Annie Dorothea Caroline Dare. They resided in a house along Thomson Road Reservoir (later known as MacRitchie Reservoir). He and his wife frequently participated in local musical and theatrical performances.

Owen was a prominent big-game hunter and frequently accompanied Ibrahim of Johor, the Sultan of Johor, on shooting trips. He received many hunting trophies, which he put on display in his house. In 1887, he shot and killed a crocodile in Serangoon, which he donated to the Raffles Museum. He also frequently went tiger hunting, which was a popular sport in Singapore at the time.

He died on 23 May 1928.
