= Anthony Jones (priest) =

Anthony Jones was a Welsh Anglican priest in the 17th century.

Jones was educated at Magdalen College, Oxford. He held livings at Penbryn, Dormington and Llantrisant. He was the archdeacon of St Davids from 1667 until his death on 22 June 1678.

Church in Wales titles
Preceded by Hugh Lloyd	Archdeacon of St Davids; 1667–1678	Succeeded by George Owen
