= George Owens =

George Owens may refer to:

- George Welshman Owens (1786–1856), United States Representative and lawyer from Georgia
- George Owens (footballer) (1900–1986), Australian rules footballer from Western Australia
- George Owens (mayor) (1808–1897), Lord Mayor of Dublin, 1876
- George Owens (rugby), rugby union and rugby league footballer of the 1910s and 1920s for Swansea (RU), Wales (RL), and Wigan
- George A. Owens (1861–1936), politician from New York
- George Albert Owens (1919–2003), American educator

== See also ==
- George Owen (disambiguation)
