= SCDF Marine Division =

- Active: 1 April 2012 – present
- Country: Singapore
- Type: Marine Firefighting
- Part of: Singapore Civil Defence Force
- Headquarters: SCDF Marine Division HQ Brani Base
- Fireboats: 6

Commanders
- Current commander: COL Chia Shang Yi
- Notable commanders: AC Derek Tan; SAC Ryan Ong

Insignia
- Ensign

The SCDF Marine Division is a division of the Singapore Civil Defence Force (SCDF) that is in-charge of marine fire and rescue operations in Singapore waters. Its duties include the marine firefighting and maritime search and rescue operations in collaboration with the Maritime and Port Authority of Singapore. It is headquartered at SCDF Marine Division HQ Brani Base on Pulau Brani.

== History ==
Prior to the SCDF Marine Division's formation, maritime firefighting was the responsibility of the Maritime and Port Authority of Singapore. The responsibility was handed over to the Singapore Civil Defence Force (SCDF) with the establishment of the then-SCDF Marine Command on 1 April 2012.

Two fireboats, Firefighter I and Firefighter II were handed over to the SCDF and subsequently modernised in 2013.

SCDF then established two Marine Fire Stations, West Coast Marine Fire Station and Brani Marine Fire Station.

In May 2017, the SCDF Marine Division launched two new custom-made Rapid Response Fire Vessels (RFV), the Red Swordfish and the Blue Swordfish. Equivalent to the land-based Red Rhinos, the two vessels are high-speed fireboats that can project 5,000 litres (1,100 imp gal) per minute. Their maximum speed is 40 knots (74 km/h). Subsequently, a third RFV, White Swordfish, with similar specifications to the Red Swordfish and the Blue Swordfish was launched in October 2018.

In 2017, the first Marine Fire Post, Loyang Marine Fire Post was opened. Co-located within Police Coast Guard (PCG) Loyang Regional Base, Loyang Marine Fire Post is under the command of Brani Marine Fire Station. The Rapid Response Fire Vessel (RFV) would be deployed to the fire post on a daily basis and provide enhanced response for incidents at the eastern and northern waters of Singapore.

In 2019, three new fireboats – the Marine Rescue Vessel (MRV), Heavy Rescue Vessel (HRV) and Heavy Fire Vessel (HFV) were commissioned in Singapore, boosting the size of the Singapore Civil Defence Force's fleet to six vessels. The HFV, codenamed the Red Sailfish has the output capability of 240,000 litres of water per minute, which was touted as the world's most powerful fireboat. The HRV, codenamed the Red Manta, is a catamaran vessel, and built to deal with mass evacuation situations. The Heavy Rescue Vessel is able to decontaminate casualties in showers on board the ship. Lastly, the MRV, codenamed the Red Dolphin, is capable to conduct both firefighting and rescue situations.

Within a short period of 4 years, SCDF was able to build up a considerable capability to respond to emergency maritime incidents, with most of the personnel derived from its land-based resources. With the expanded capabilities and responsibilities, the Marine Command was re-designated the Marine Division in April 2019.

In 2019, the Marine Division's Rescue Jet Ski (RJ) was unveiled. It is a rescue equipment to facilitate shallow water operations. The RJ is designed for conducting swift water rescue of casualties in shallow waters without fear of grounding due to its shallow draft and towing sled.

In 2020, the second Marine Fire Post, Gul Marine Fire Post was opened. Under the command of the West Coast Marine Fire Station, Gul Marine Fire Post provides further coverage to the western waters of Singapore.

On 16 May 2024, SCDF regular Captain Tay Xue Qin Kenneth, 30 who assigned to SCDF Marine Division died while fighting a fire on a Chinese flagged container ship that was anchored in the southwest of Singapore at 12:15 am. The rota commander subsequently lost consciousness and pronounced dead at 5:50am at National University Hospital. Reported by the press as being the second SCDF member to have died during an operation & was given a ceremonial funeral.

== Future ==
SCDF Marine Division is conducting proof-of-concept trials on the use of unmanned technologies for both fire and rescue operations. Technologies such as the Unmanned Aerial Vehicle (UAV) and the Unmanned Surface Vessel (USV) would provide SCDF further capabilities while conducting operations in the waters.

The Marine Division is also targeting to expand its fleet size to 10 vessels by 2029. The original plans to open a third Marine Fire Station at Tanah Merah by 2022 was delayed and due to operationalise on a later date. It is also planning to open both the Punggol Marine Fire Post and a brand new Marine Division HQ by 2025.

== Decommissioned Vessels ==
Vessel	History
Marine Fire Vessels (MFV) (Firefighter I and Firefighter II)	The two MFVs, formerly known as Api Api 1 and Api Api 2, had operated under the ownership of the Maritime and Port Authority of Singapore (MPA) until 2012 when they were transferred to SCDF. They were refurbished and renamed as Firefighter I and Firefighter II in 2013. Both vessels were decommissioned in August 2021.

== See also ==
- List of fire departments
- Rescue squad
