= Anthony Jones (photographer) =

Anthony Jones (born 1962) is an English photographer known for his black and white photos of the urban environment.

Jones was born in London, but moved to East Anglia during his childhood. He uses a Hasselblad medium format camera to make black and white, square, silver-gelatin prints of London and the Art Deco masterpiece, Battersea Power Station. His work has been exhibited at the Victoria and Albert Museum and photo galleries, published in photography magazines, and licensed by the Corbis stock photography library. Jones' self-portrait has been exhibited at the National Portrait Gallery, London.

His work is part of a six-month group exhibition at the Fox Talbot Museum, Lacock Abbey, Wiltshire.

== Sources ==
- Interview with Sophie Martin-Castex
- Interview for Precious Magazine
- Roger Watson on Anthony Jones
- Elizabeth Avedon blog : Anthony Jones
- Canary Wharf snaps help world famous photo museum
