= George Owen (priest) =

Welsh Anglican priest

George Owen was a Welsh Anglican priest in the 17th century.

Owen was educated at Merton College, Oxford. He held livings at Lampeter Velfrey, Narberth and Stackpole. He was archdeacon of St Davids from 1678 until his death on 20 October 1690.
