= Singapore Civil Defence Force =

Emergency services organisation in Singapore

- Pasukan Pertahanan Awam Singapura (Malay) 新加坡民防部队 (Chinese) சிங்கப்பூர் குடிமைத் தற்காப்புப் படை (Tamil)

Operational area
- Country: Singapore

Agency overview
- Established: 6 November 1982; 44 years ago
- Annual calls: 191,492 (2018)
- Employees: 6,000
- Annual budget: S$617 million (2019)
- Commissioner: Eric Yap Wee Teck
- EMS level: ALS
- Motto: The Life Saving Force

Facilities and equipment
- Divisions: 5
- Stations: 23
- Engines: 42
- Trucks: 2
- Platforms: 20
- Ambulances: 69 SCDF; 34 Private
- HAZMAT: 13
- Fireboats: 6

Website
- Official website

The Singapore Civil Defence Force (SCDF) is a uniformed organisation in Singapore which operates under the Ministry of Home Affairs and provides emergency services such as firefighting, technical rescue, and emergency medical services, and coordinates national civil defence programmes.

== History ==
Singapore's first Fire Committee was formed in 1855. Prior to this, fires were attended to by uniformed groups which included the police, sepoys, marine soldiers and even convicts. On 7 September 1869, the then-Governor, Major-General Sir Harry St. George Ord, enacted the Fire Ordinance and appointed the office of Colonial Engineer as Chairman of the Fire Commission for Singapore. This Fire Commission was however later disbanded in 1884 due to poor organisation and difficult circumstances. In 1888, the Singapore Fire Brigade was established as a fully-equipped professional brigade with sufficient funding. By 1909, there were a total of three built stations servicing Singapore, namely Central Fire Station at Hill Street, Cross Street and Kallang Fire Stations. In 1980, the brigade was officially renamed the Singapore Fire Service (SFS).

In 1970, based on organisational elements of the SPF's Vigilante Corps, raised in the early 1960s, the Police Civil Defence Force was created under the purview of the Singapore Police Force. In 1982, the National Civil Defence Plan was launched, which spearheaded the emergency preparedness for the nation at large. As a consequence of this plan, the majority of the SPF-VC's serving personnel joined the SPF-PCDF, which the plan designated as the nation's primary organization for civil defence and disaster response. With the enactment of the Civil Defence Act in 1986, the Singapore Civil Defence Force (SCDF), by now separate from the SPF proper, was established as an organisation under the Ministry of Home Affairs. In the same year, the Hotel New World disaster paved the way for joint operations between the SCDF and SFS. The SCDF and SFS were merged into a single organisation on 15 April 1989.

The newly integrated SCDF mainly used facilities which were handed over from the Singapore Armed Forces (SAF) or the Singapore Police Force (SPF). Since the early 2000s, its headquarters and territorial divisions have all moved into purpose-built facilities. SCDF's involvement in regional disaster relief operations has also raised its profile significantly.

On 18 January 2009, SCDF was classified by INSARAG as a heavy urban search and rescue team, the highest level of urban search and rescue service.

== Organisation structure ==
SCDF is led by the Commissioner of the SCDF and three deputy commissioners, respectively in charge of Strategy & Corporate Services, Operations & Resilience and Future Technology & Public Safety. The SCDF is organised with one headquarter element commanding seven divisions. Of the latter, four (1st, 2nd, 3rd, and 4th Divisions) are territorial divisions; another two are training divisions, namely the Civil Defence Academy (CDA) and National Service Training Centre (NSTC) and can be activated as the 5th and 6th Divisions respectively in times of emergency; the eighth is the Marine Division, which was set up on 1 April 2012 with the capability and capacity to respond to marine fire and rescue incidents.

=== Leadership ===
Appointment	Rank and office holder
Commissioner SCDF	COMR Eric Yap Wee Teck
Deputy Commissioner SCDF (Strategy & Corporate Services)	DC Teong How Hwa
Deputy Commissioner SCDF (Operations & Resilience)	DC Ling Young Ern
Deputy Commissioner SCDF (Future Technology & Public Safety)	DC Daniel Seet Siew Teck
Assistant Commissioner SCDF	AC Ryan Ong Yuan Wei

=== Staff departments ===
==== Operations & Resilience ====
Department	Area of responsibility
Operations Department	Controls and maintains SCDF's frontline operational readiness across the island
Emergency Medical Services Department	Controls and maintains SCDF's Paramedic, EMT and ambulance response across the island
Hazardous Materials Department	Regulates and enforces Hazardous Materials (HazMat) products in Singapore
Volunteer and Community Partnership Department	Community engagement and fire prevention

==== Future Technology and Public Safety ====
Department	Area of responsibility
Transformation and Future Technology Department	Development of Science & Technology
Fire Safety and Shelter Department	Maintains and regulates fire safety; Manages and regulates all CD Shelters in Singapore
Central Enforcement Department	Enforces fire safety and conducts fire safety inspections
Training Department	Training and maintenance of firefighting standards
Civil Defence Academy	Conduct of vocational training such as Firefighting Course and EMT course as well as leadership and command & staff courses
National Service Training Centre	Conducts Basic Rescue Training for newly enlisted National Servicemen as well as In Camp Training for NSmen

==== Strategy and Corporate Services ====
Department	Area of responsibility
Service Excellence Department	Handling of public feedback and service quality affairs
Planning and Organisation Department	Administrative, strategic planning and organisational development
Human Resources Department	Human resource management of active personnel and Civil Defence National Servicemen
Finance Department	Finance services
Logistics Department	Procurement, distribution and maintenance of equipment

=== Headquarters ===
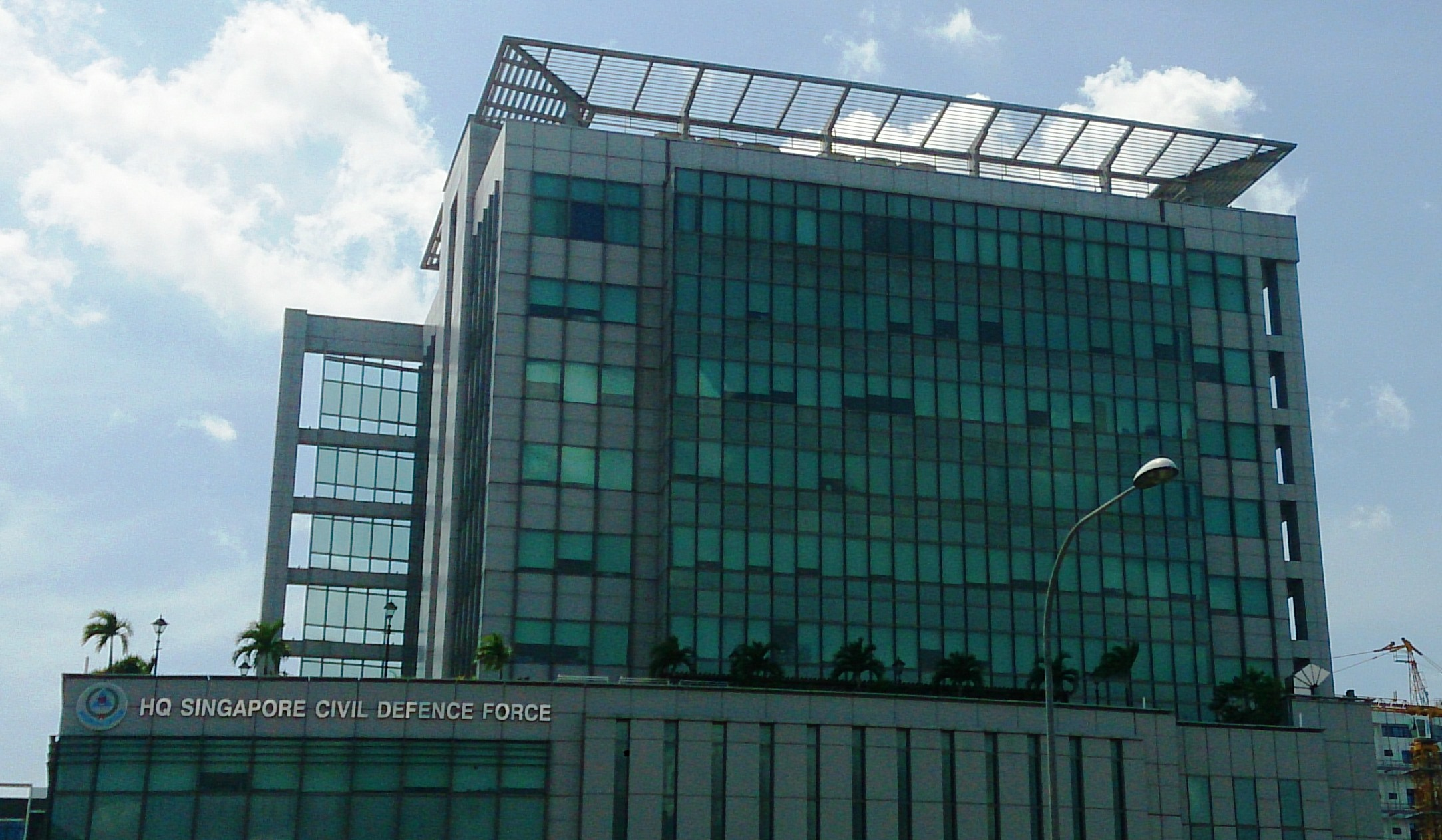
The administration office tower of HQ SCDF

HQ SCDF, Central Supply Base, SCDF Operations Centre, and Paya Lebar Fire Station are located in the Civil Defence Complex at Ubi.

=== Operational divisions ===
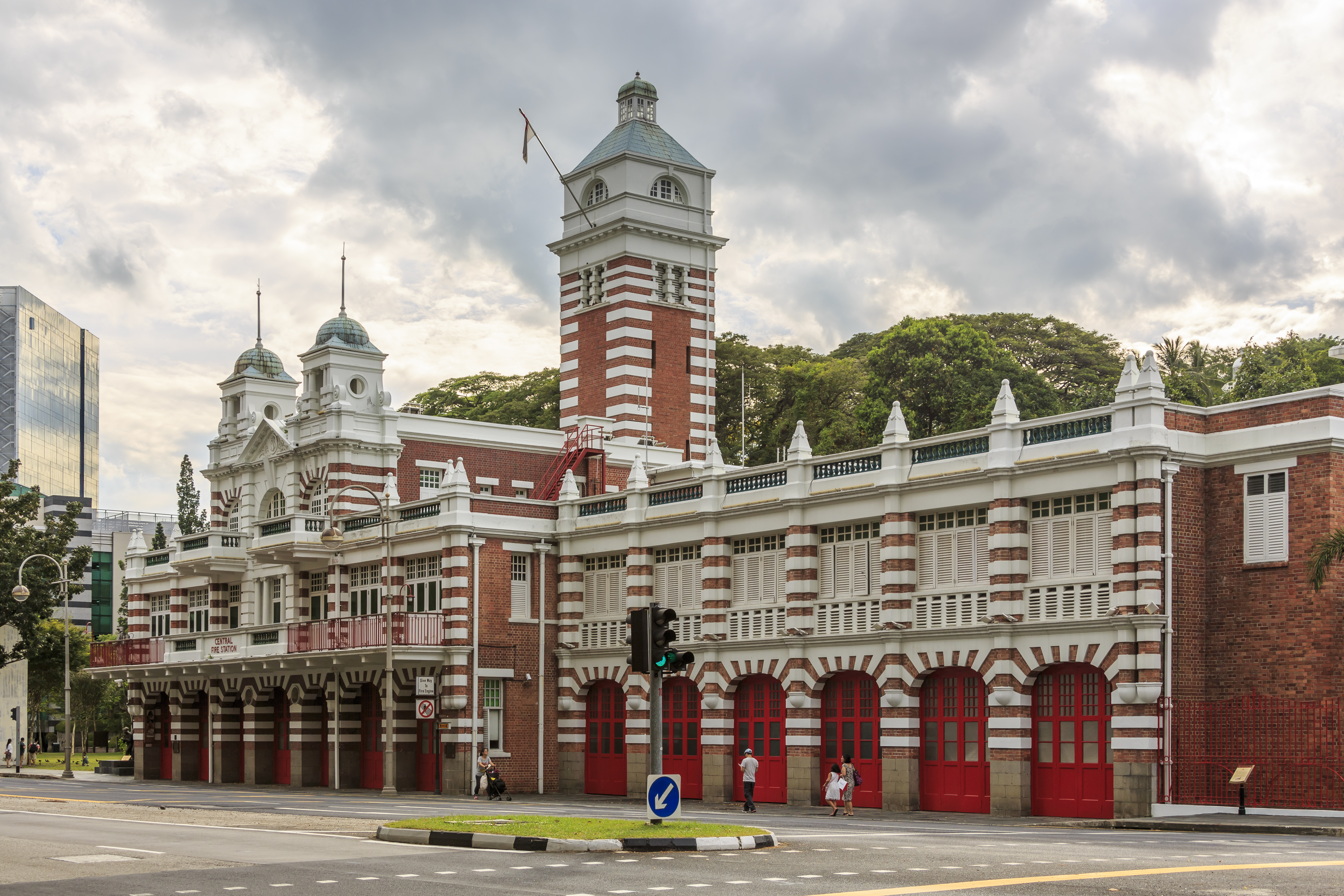
Central Fire Station, built in 1909, is Singapore's oldest fire station

Each territorial division has a boundary of responsibility within Singapore, and possesses its own command centre and hazmat capabilities. Administrative and logistical support is split between Corporate Service Hub East and Corporate Service Hub West.

Division	Responsibility	Fire Stations	Fire Posts	Location
1st Division	Covers the general south of Singapore, stretching from Clementi to the Central Business District (CBD), and also includes Jurong Island, an oil refining centre.	Central, Alexandra, Clementi, Jurong Island, Bishan, Banyan, Marina Bay, and Sentosa	Boon Keng, Cairnhill, Bukit Merah View, Telok Blangah, Clementi West, Dover, Jurong Pier and Toa Payoh	Queenstown (co-located with Queenstown Neighbourhood Police Centre and Alexandra Fire Station)
2nd Division	Covers the east of Singapore, including Changi Airport.	Paya Lebar, Changi, Tampines, and Kallang	Eunos, Marine Parade, Chai Chee, Upper Changi, Siglap (Ambulance Post), Pasir Ris and Joo Seng	Tampines (co-located with Tampines Fire Station)
3rd Division	Covers the north and northeast of Singapore including Pulau Ubin.	Yishun, Ang Mo Kio, Sengkang, and Punggol	Nee Soon Central, Sembawang, Cheng San, and Braddell Heights	Yishun (co-located with Yishun Fire Station)
4th Division	Covers the west and northwest of Singapore.	Jurong, Tuas, Woodlands, Bukit Batok, and Tuas View	Jurong East, Jurong West, Tuas Checkpoint, Woodlands, Sungei Kadut, Bukit Panjang, Choa Chu Kang and Bukit Timah	Bukit Batok (co-located with Bukit Batok Fire Station)
Marine Division (8th Division)	Covers marine fire and rescue incidents.	West Coast and Brani	Gul and Loyang	Pulau Brani (co-located with Brani Marine Fire Station)

=== Specialist units ===
Units	Abbreviation	Area of responsibility
Disaster Assistance and Rescue Team	DART	SCDF's elite team that specialises in complex incidents such as technical rescue, large-scale disasters and prolonged firefighting
Special Response Unit	SRU	Special Response Unit (SRU) specialises in decontamination, large fire, rescue operations, mass casualty ambulance conveyance, and provides additional manpower support to all operational divisions
Fire Investigation Unit	FIU	Fire Investigation Unit (FIU) is in-charge of conducting post-incident investigation to determine the probable causes of fire

=== Training divisions ===
The Civil Defence Academy (CDA) conducts training for the various vocations and specialisations within the SCDF, including the Section Commander Course (SCC) and Rota Commander Course (RCC).

The National Service Training Centre (NSTC) conducts training for national servicemen. It consists of the Basic Rescue Training Branch (BRTB), which conducts basic training for new enlistees in basic rescue skills and fitness, and the In-Camp Training Branch (ICTB), which trains Operationally Ready NSmen. The Civil Defence Detention Barracks, under the purview of the SCDF Provost Unit, are also located in a corner of the NSTC. Detainees from both SCDF and SPF can be detained here throughout the duration of their detention. Subunits of the Provost Unit are also housed here.

The Home Team Tactical Centre provides an additional training ground for trainees to experience. It replaces the Mandai Training Village which has since been demolished.

== List of appliances ==
The SCDF maintains a large fleet of custom-made vehicles (referred to as appliances) that are capable of mitigating a variety of incidents. Many of the appliances were designed and commissioned by the SCDF rather than ready-made designs.

=== Paramedical response vehicles ===
==== Ambulance ====
The ambulance forms the backbone of Singapore's medical emergency response capability and is the most widely deployed appliance. Ambulances are often referred to by their callsign, "Alpha." Each ambulance is staffed by up to 3 emergency medical technicians (one serving as a driver) and 1 paramedic. Medic trainees from the Singapore Armed Forces can also be sent for attachment to these Ambulances. The latest 7th Generation ambulances comes with a self-decontamination system which is capable of decontaminating the ambulance when needed.

==== Medical Support Vehicle (MSV) ====
The Medical Support Vehicle (MSV) is a truck that is designed to provide on-site treatment capabilities for mass casualty incidents. On reaching an incident site, it is able to fold out and expand to form a mobile aid station, with up to 16 beds, to perform on-site stabilization and critical invasive medical treatment. When fully deployed, it is capable of treating a large number of patients simultaneously on an operating table that slides under its "wings". In addition, MSVs are loaded with a larger inventory of medical equipment, being able to treat up to 400 patients per vehicle, so as to manage mass-casualty incidents.

=== Firefighting appliances ===
==== Fire Bike ====
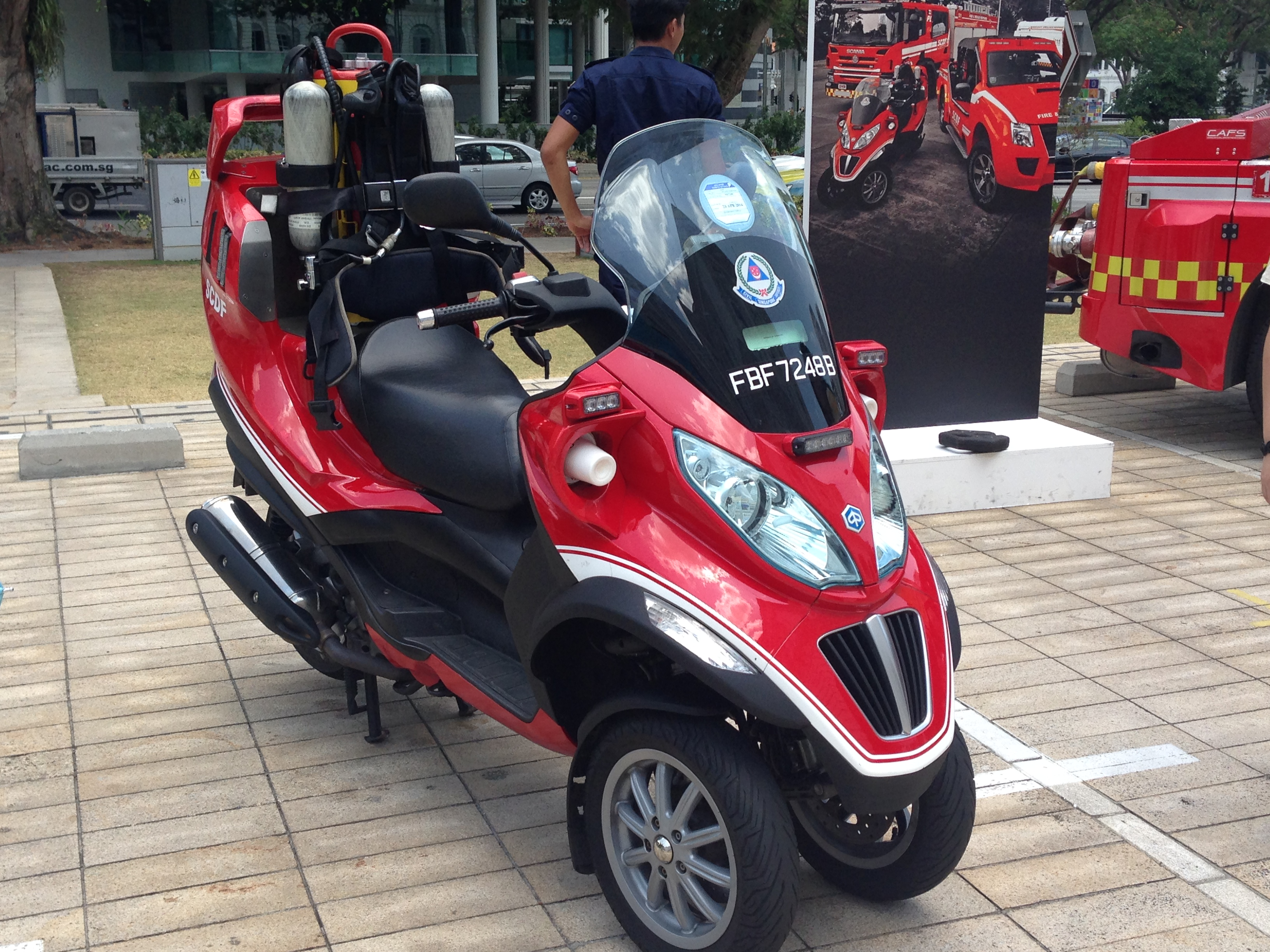
A Fire Bike

The Fire Bike, also known as the Red Scorpion, is a three-wheeled Piaggio MP3 that carries a single firefighter. They are able to navigate traffic to provide a faster initial response to emergencies. The Fire Bike carries a compressed air foam backpack which can extinguish handle smaller conflagrations such as household and vehicle fires. It is also equipped with an automated external defibrillator to respond to medical emergencies in concert with an ambulance.

==== Light Fire Attack Vehicle (LFAV) ====
6th Gen LFAV

The Light Fire Attack Vehicle (LFAV), also known as the Red Rhino, was first introduced in 2000. It is designed to be more compact than a traditional fire engine, allowing it to be stationed at a larger variety of locations.

The most recent iteration is the 6th generation, unveiled in 2022 at the SCDF Workplan Seminar. Instead of the traditional 4-man crew in the previous LFAV generations, the 6th generation carries a robot named the Red Rhino Robot (3R) which fits in the rear passenger compartment. The 3R conducts reconnaissance operations to locate the seat of fire through the use of thermal imaging and relay the information to the operator, who can then direct firefighting operations. The robot is able to mitigate a fire within confines of approximately 15m^{2}.

==== Pump Ladder (PL) ====
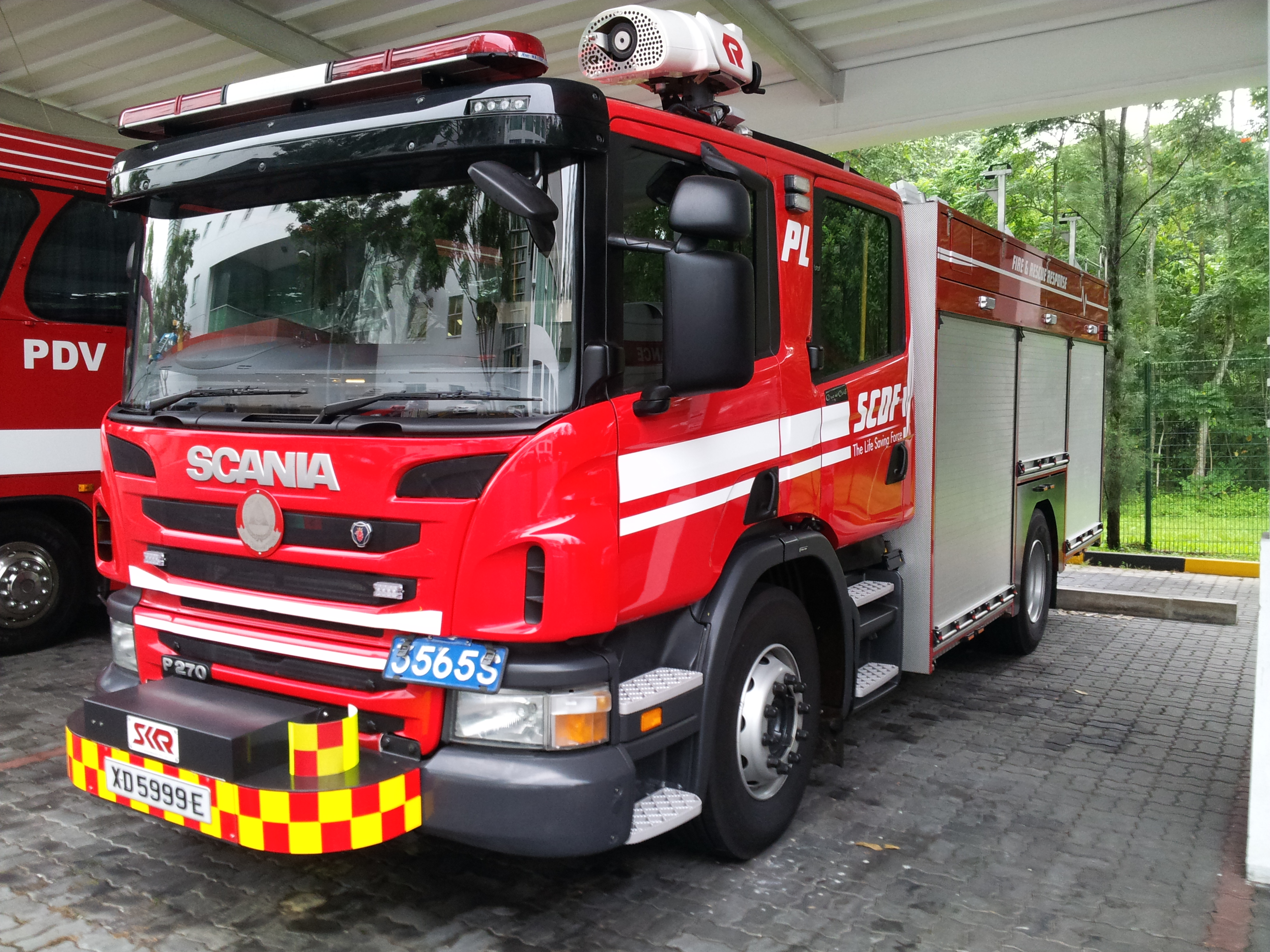
Generation E of the SCDF Pump Ladder featuring a Compressed Air Foam (CAF) pump

The Pump Ladder (PL) is the workhorse fire engine of the SCDF. It carries 2,400 litres of water and 1,200 litres of foam, along with other rescue and firefighting equipment. The PL is also equipped to set up hasty decontamination facilities for a chemical incident. The decontamination lanes can be set up within four minutes, and each lane is able to decontaminate up to 36 walking casualties or six lying casualties per hour. The Generation E of the PL features a compress air foam pump.

==== Combined Platform-Ladder (CPL) ====
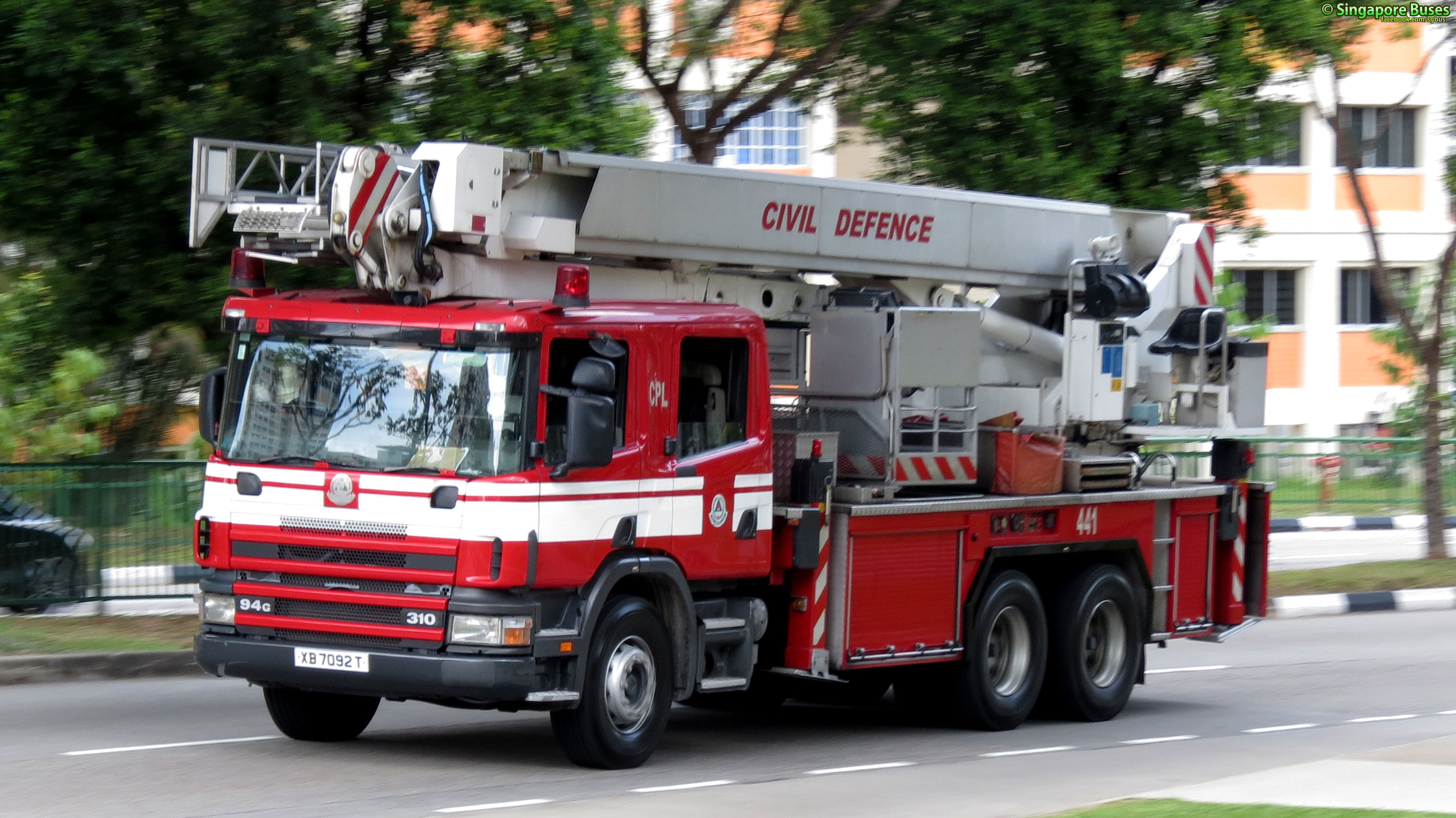
A Combined Platform Ladder (CPL)

The Combined Platform-Ladder (CPL) is a hydraulic ladder-platform truck which is used to conduct external firefighting and rescue operations involving high-rise buildings. There are several variants of CPL in SCDF, the largest being the CPL60 which can extend its platform ladder up to a maximum height of 60 metres, the equivalent of a 20-storey building. Its platform is equipped with a water monitor capable of discharging water at the rate of 3,800 litres per minute, and a rescue cage that can hold up to 500 kg.

==== Aerial Ladder (AL) ====
The Aerial Ladder (AL) is a ladder truck used in the SCDF for aerial firefighting and rescue. It has an operational height of 56 metres.

==== Fire and Rescue Operations Support Tender (FROST) ====
The Fire and Rescue Operations Support Tender (FROST) is a support appliance that provides additional sets of self-contained breathing apparatus, thermal imaging cameras, gas detectors and smoke and water extraction functions to facilitate difficult or prolonged rescue operations.

It was designed to consolidate the functions of the previous Breathing Apparatus Tender (BAT) and Damage Control Tender (DCT), halving the total manpower needed for these functions from eight to four.

==== Modular Oil Tank Firefighting System (MOTFS) ====
The Modular Oil Tank Fire-Fighting System (MOTFS) is an oil tank fire fighting system capable of discharging large volumes of foam for large-scale fires, up to 100,000 litres per minute. It is also capable of drafting water supply directly from open sources such as the sea or marine vessels. It is also designed in a modular form to speed up deployment to match the scale of the incident.

==== Unmanned Firefighting Machine (UFM) ====
The Unmanned Firefighting Machine (UFM) is a remote controlled fire-fighting unit built to operate in extreme heat and hazardous environments, by using high velocity airflow to create ventilation in smoke-logged areas, and intense water mist, jet or foam to put out fires. It was first launched in April 2014. In 2015, the UFM added a rail kit to enable the unit to manoeuvre in Mass Rapid Transit tunnels at up to 40 km/h to put out fires and conduct ventilation operations.

==== Pumper Firefighting Machine ====
The custom-built Pumper Firefighting Machine can traverse up and down a staircase, fit into passenger lifts and penetrate through premises with a maximum temperature of 250-degree Celsius for up to 10 minutes. Other unique features include a rotating nozzle that can project water mist in 360-degree angles to quickly lower room temperatures and a high pressure hose reel with a built-in water tank that can allow firefighters to quickly initiate firefighting operations at incidents. Its resistance to heat also means that firefighters will be less exposed to risk during firefighting operations.

=== Hazmat appliances ===
==== Hazmat Mitigation Vehicle ====
The Hazmat Mitigation Vehicle (HMV) is a hazardous materials apparatus that transports Hazmat personnel and their equipment to an incident site. The HMV carries a Hazmat Utility Buggy (HUB) in the rear of the appliance, where it can be unloaded to assess incident developments, transport equipment and convey casualties out of the hazard area.

==== Hazmat Decon Pod ====
The Hazmat Decon Pod conducts environmental decontamination by sucking in contaminated air and purifying it at a high rate to remove hazardous material and render an area more hospitable for work following a chemical, biological, radiological and nuclear incident.

==== Mass Decontamination Vehicle (MDV) ====
The Mass Decontamination Vehicle (MDV) is a large bus that is able to transport personnel and equipment, perform the decontamination of a large number casualties, and convey the casualties to the hospital.

==== Hazmat Control Vehicle ====
The Hazmat Control Vehicle carries a chemical detector to detect and monitor chemical release from up to 5 km away. It is also fitted with a launchpad for unmanned aerial vehicles to extend the range and altitude of its chemical detection capabilities.

=== Command elements ===
==== Command Vehicle (CV) and Forward Command Vehicle (FCV) ====
The Command Vehicle (CV) functions as a mobile headquarters command and control centre. The vehicles are the size of a large bus, and when deployed, the body of the vehicle stretches to thrice its size on the road, allowing ample space inside the vehicle for personnel and essential computer and communications equipment. CVs are deployed to strategic locations to provide forward tactical headquarters capability in major incidents or high-risk events.

==== Hazmat Command Vehicle (HCV) ====
The Hazmat Command Vehicle (HCV) is a command post specifically designed for command and control during a CBR incident. It is equipped for this task with a wide array of instruments and sensors which can, for example, monitor and help predict toxic material presence and dispersion in the wind.

=== Special vehicles ===
==== DART Rescue Vehicle (DRV) ====
The DART Rescue Vehicle (DRV) is a specialised appliance of the Disaster Assistance and Rescue Team designed for urban search and rescue. It carries a personnel cabin and can accommodate up to eight DART officers with their equipment. The DRV is equipped with a crane with a load capacity of 7.9 tonnes. It is primarily used to load other rescue vehicles like the DART skid loader, which is used to access confined spaces in collapsed buildings.

==== Fireboats ====
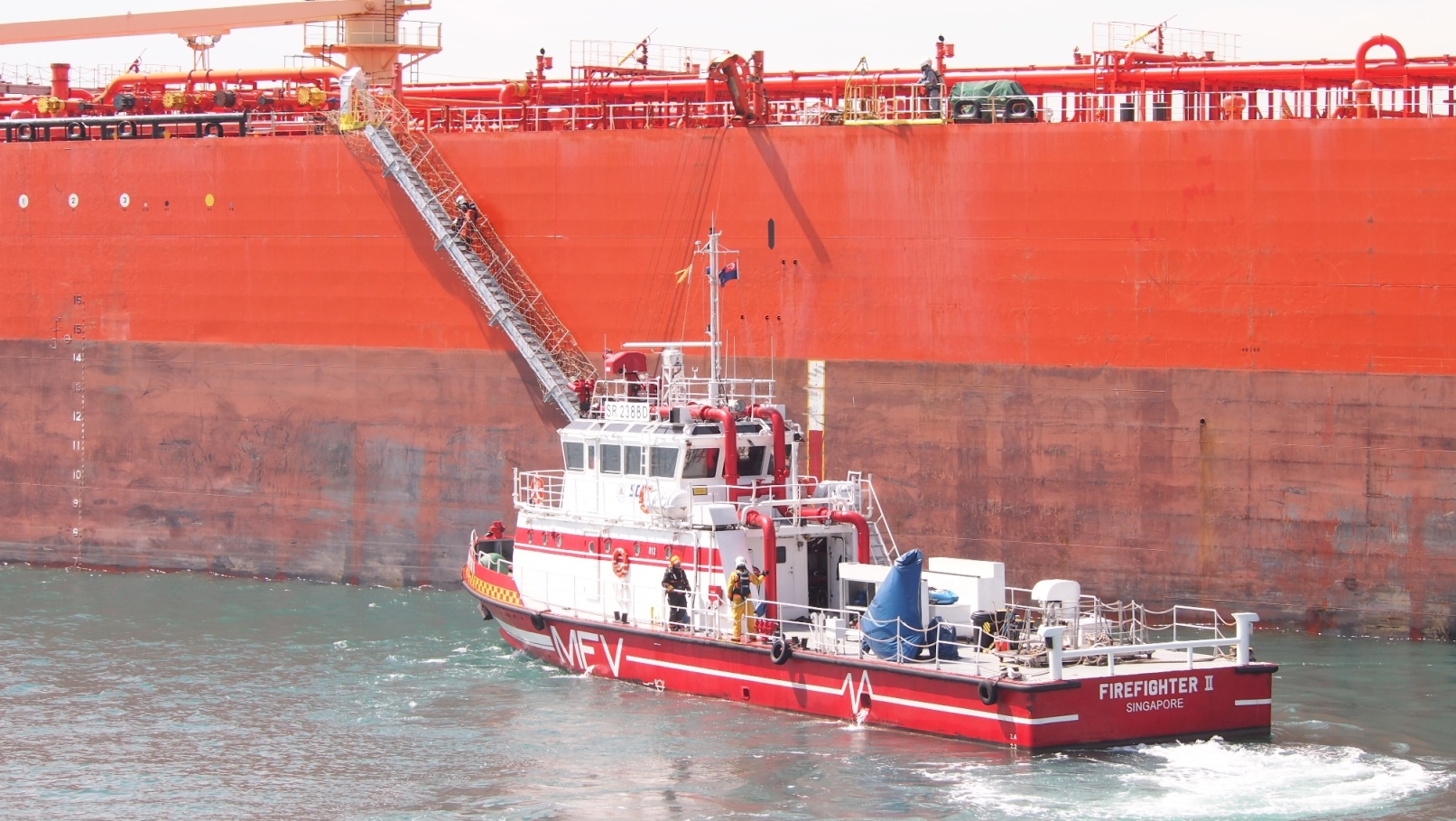
The Marine Firefighting Vessel of the SCDF Marine Division participating in a chemical spill simulation exercise

In 2012, the Singapore Civil Defence Force took over responsibility from the Maritime Port Authority for fighting maritime fires. By 2019, the SCDF Marine Division had retired some old fireboats, and added six new modern vessels, bringing the size of the firefighting fleet to eight vessels. One of the new vessels, the Red Sailfish, is the most powerful fireboat in the world so far. Three vessels are pumper, decontamination and evacuation specialist fireboats.

== Operation Lionheart ==
SCDF maintains a rescue contingent on 24-hour standby under the codename Operation Lionheart to provide rescue and humanitarian assistance and support to countries stricken by major disasters. Since its formation in 1990, the Operation Lionheart contingent had responded to multiple overseas missions.

Below is the breakdown of the missions:

Disaster	Country/Territory	Year
Baguio City Earthquake	Baguio City, Philippines	Jul 1990
Highland Towers collapse	Kuala Lumpur, Malaysia	Dec 1993
Tai Chung County Earthquake	Taiwan	Sep 1999
Asian Tsunami Disaster	Aceh, Indonesia	Dec 2004
Asian Tsunami Disaster	Khao Lak, Thailand	Dec 2004
Sumatra Earthquake	Nias Island, Indonesia	Mar 2005
Rokan Hilir Bush Fires	Sumatra, Indonesia	Aug 2005
South Asian Earthquake	Muzaffarabad, Pakistan	Oct 2005
Central Java Earthquake	Central Java, Indonesia	May 2006
Sichuan Earthquake	Sichuan, China	May 2008
Padang City Earthquake	Sumatra, Indonesia	Oct 2009
Christchurch Earthquake	Christchurch, New Zealand	Mar 2011
Japan Earthquake	Soma City, Japan	Mar 2011
Malaysia, Flood	Kelantan, Malaysia	Dec 2014
Thailand, Forest Fire	Chiang Mai, Thailand	Mar 2015
Nepal Earthquake	Kathmandu, Nepal	May 2015
Australia Floods	New South Wales, Australia	2022
Turkey Earthquake	Turkey/Syria	Feb 2023
Myanmar Earthquake	Naypyidaw, Myanmar	Mar 2025

== Ranks ==
Officers

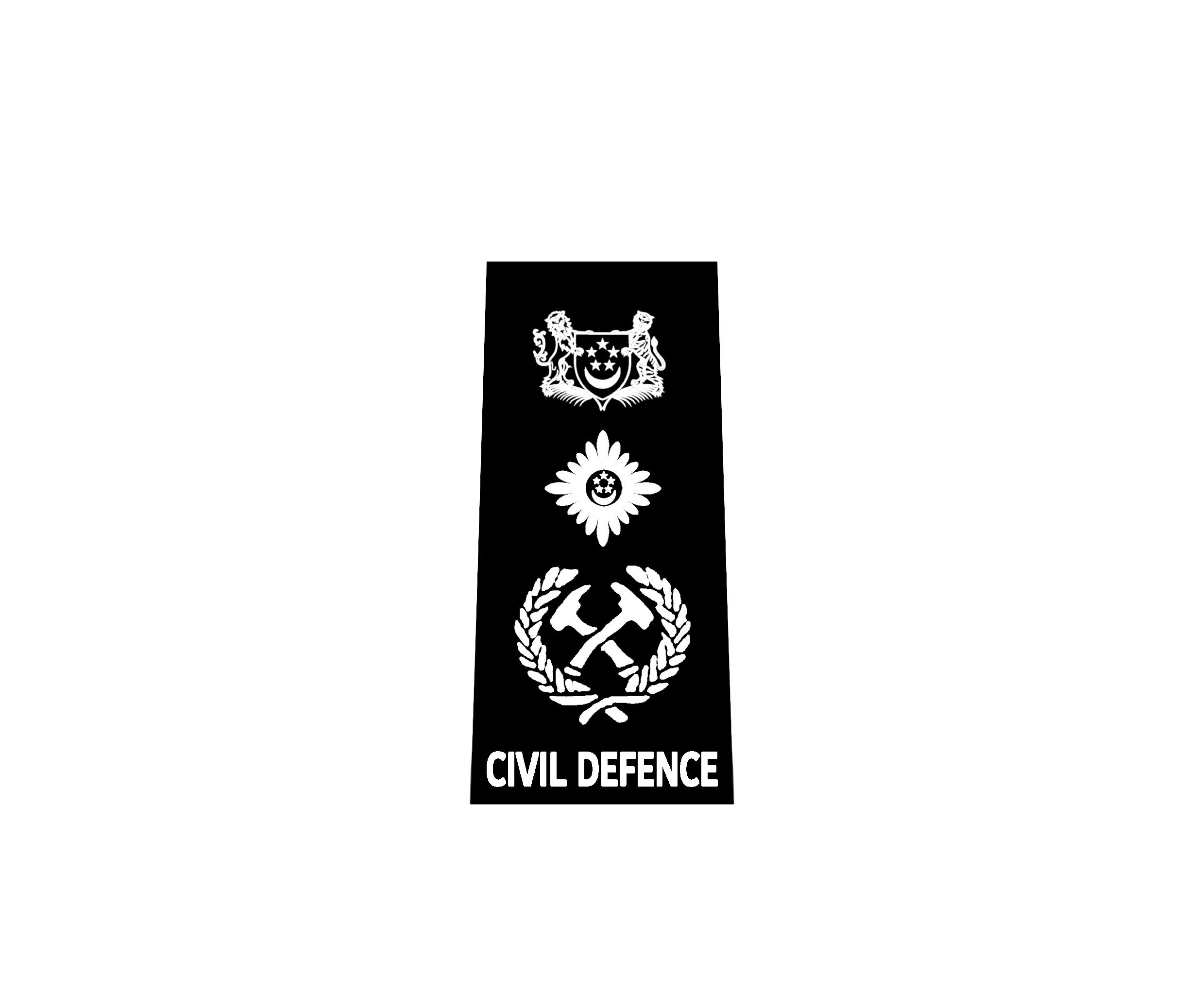
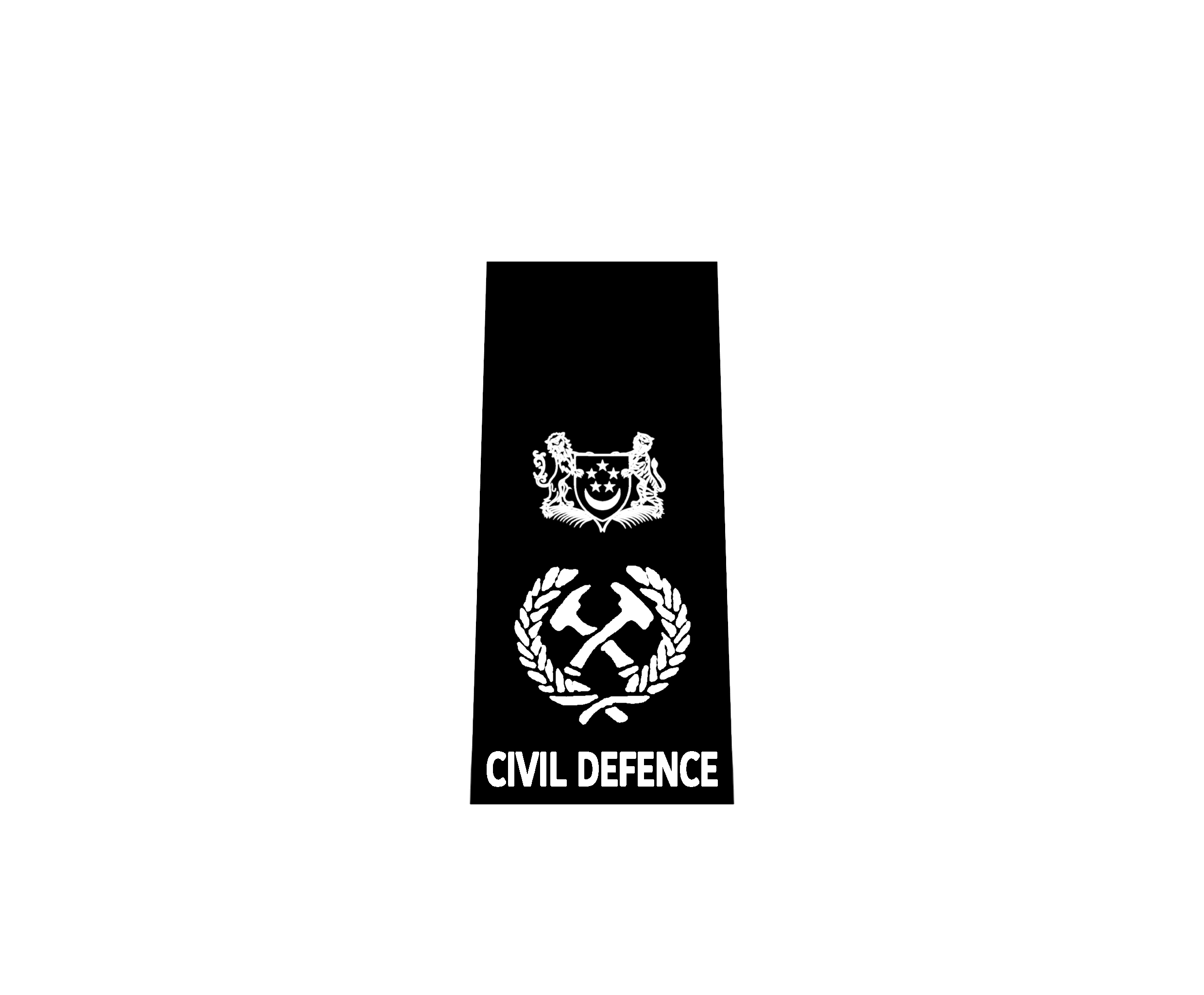
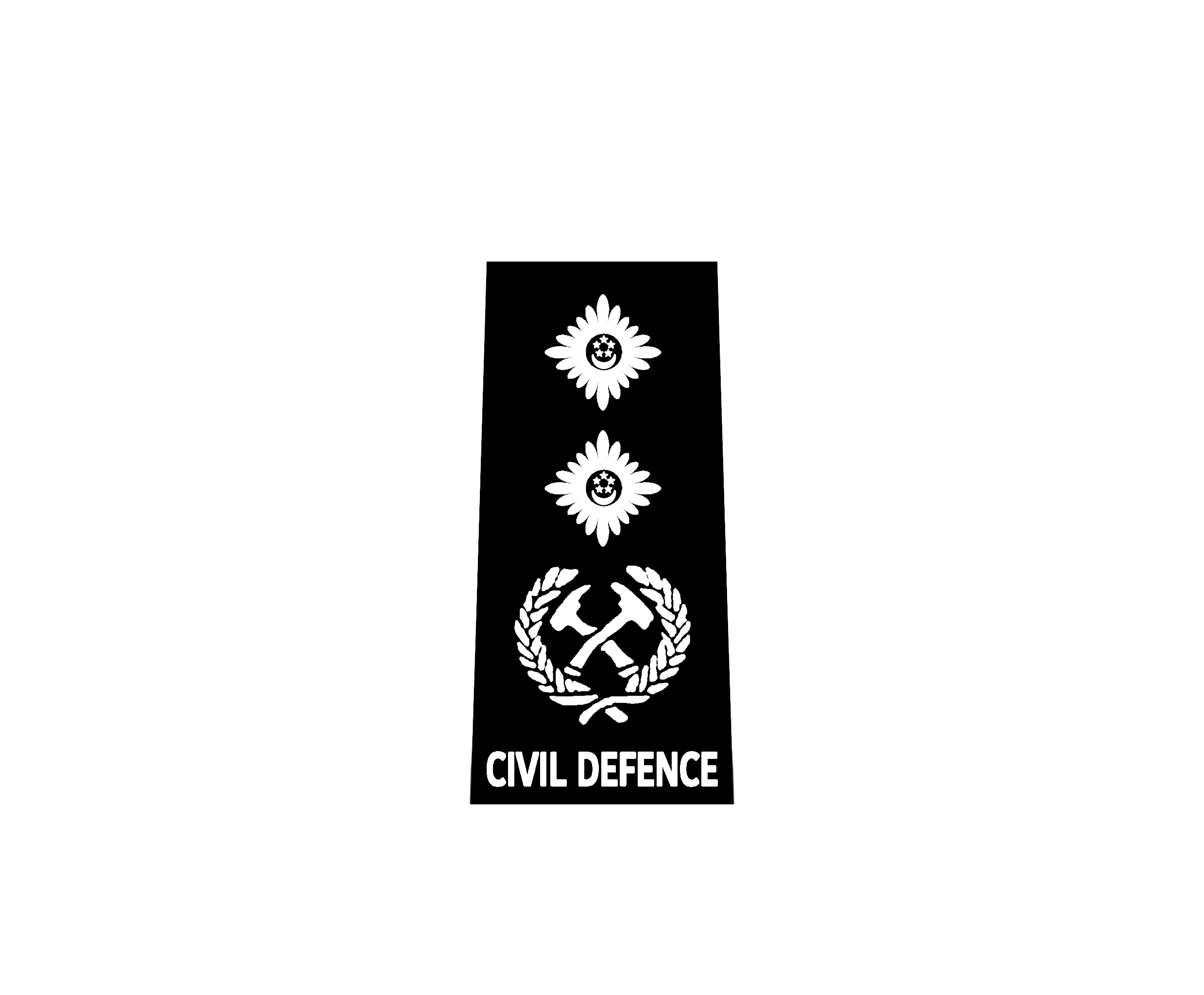
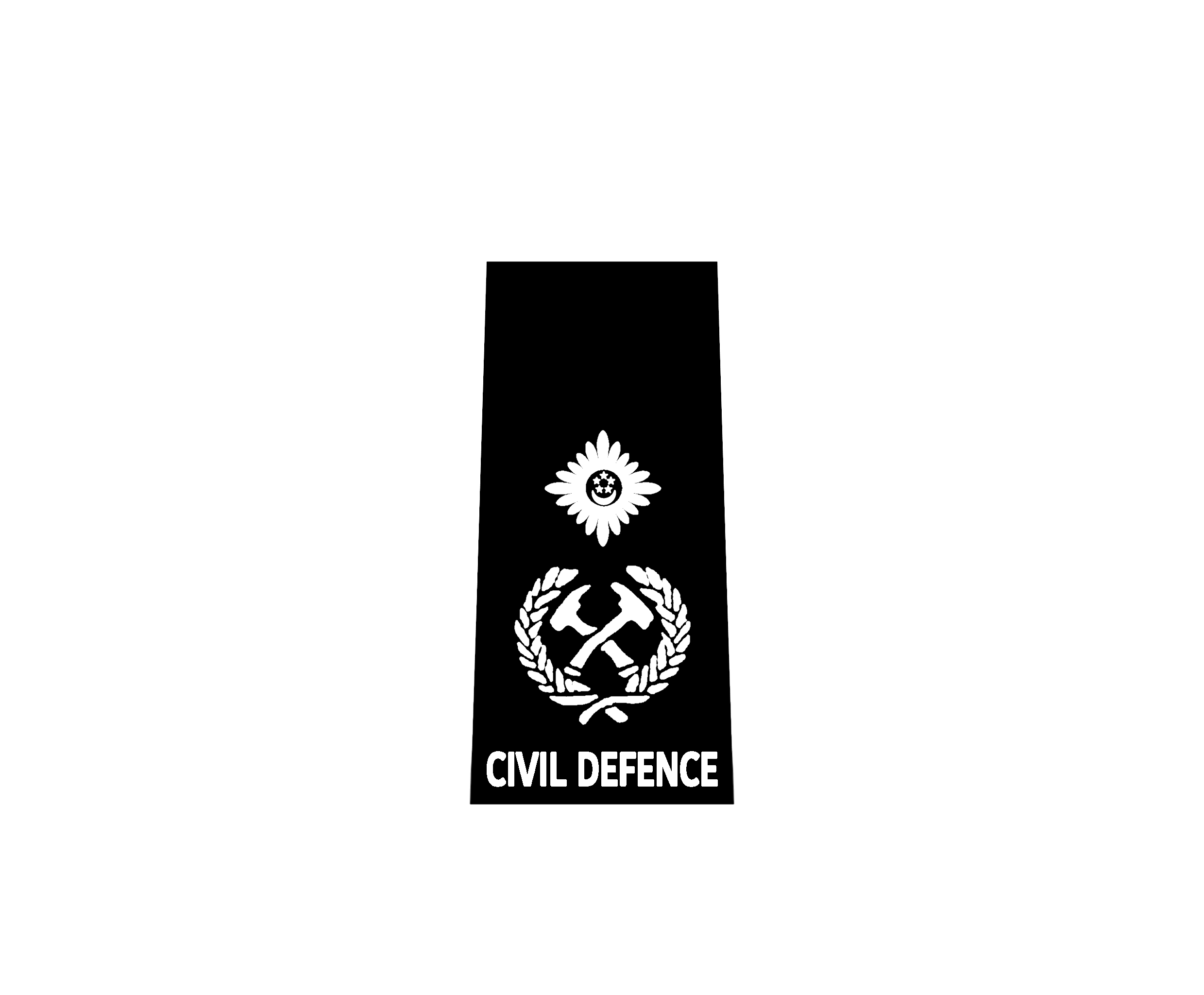
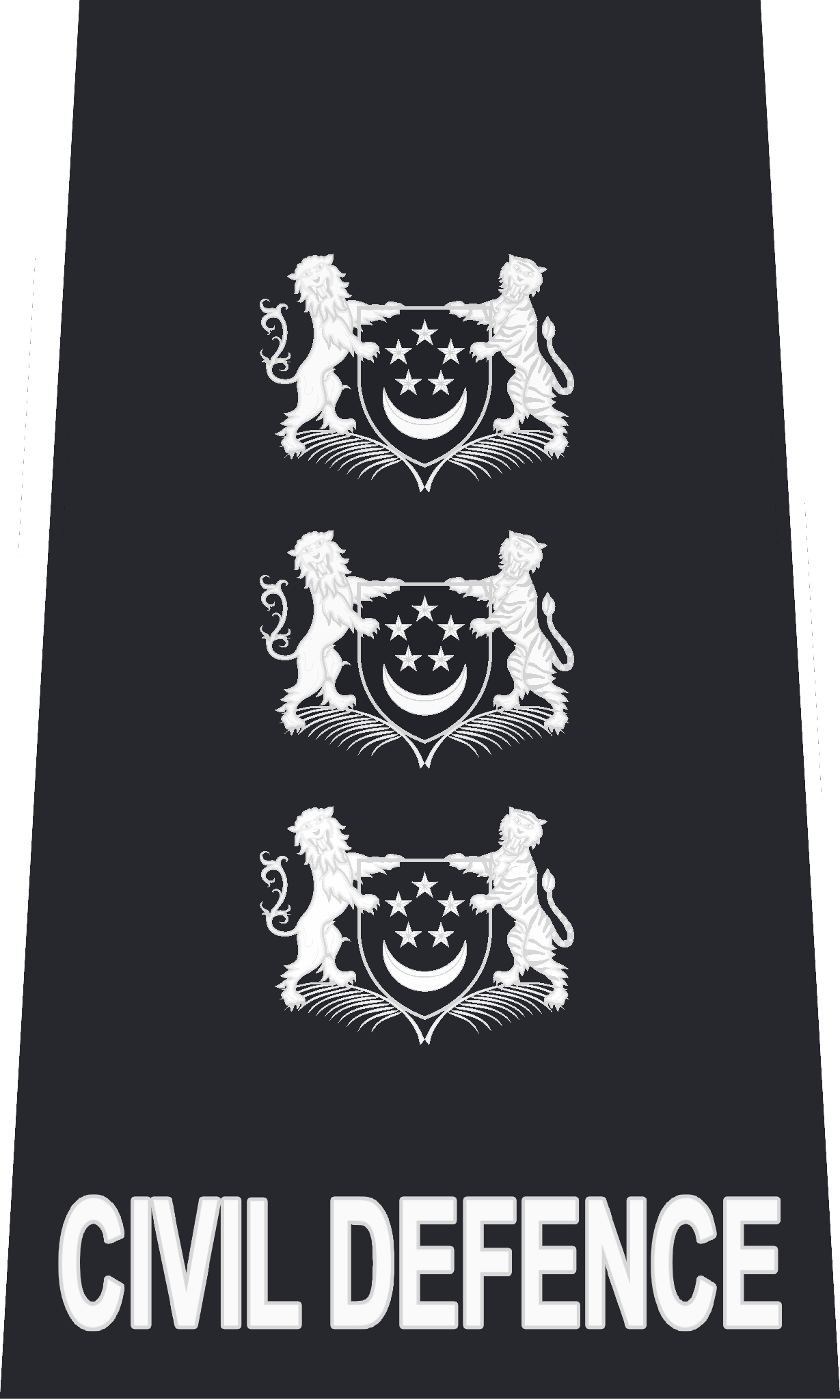
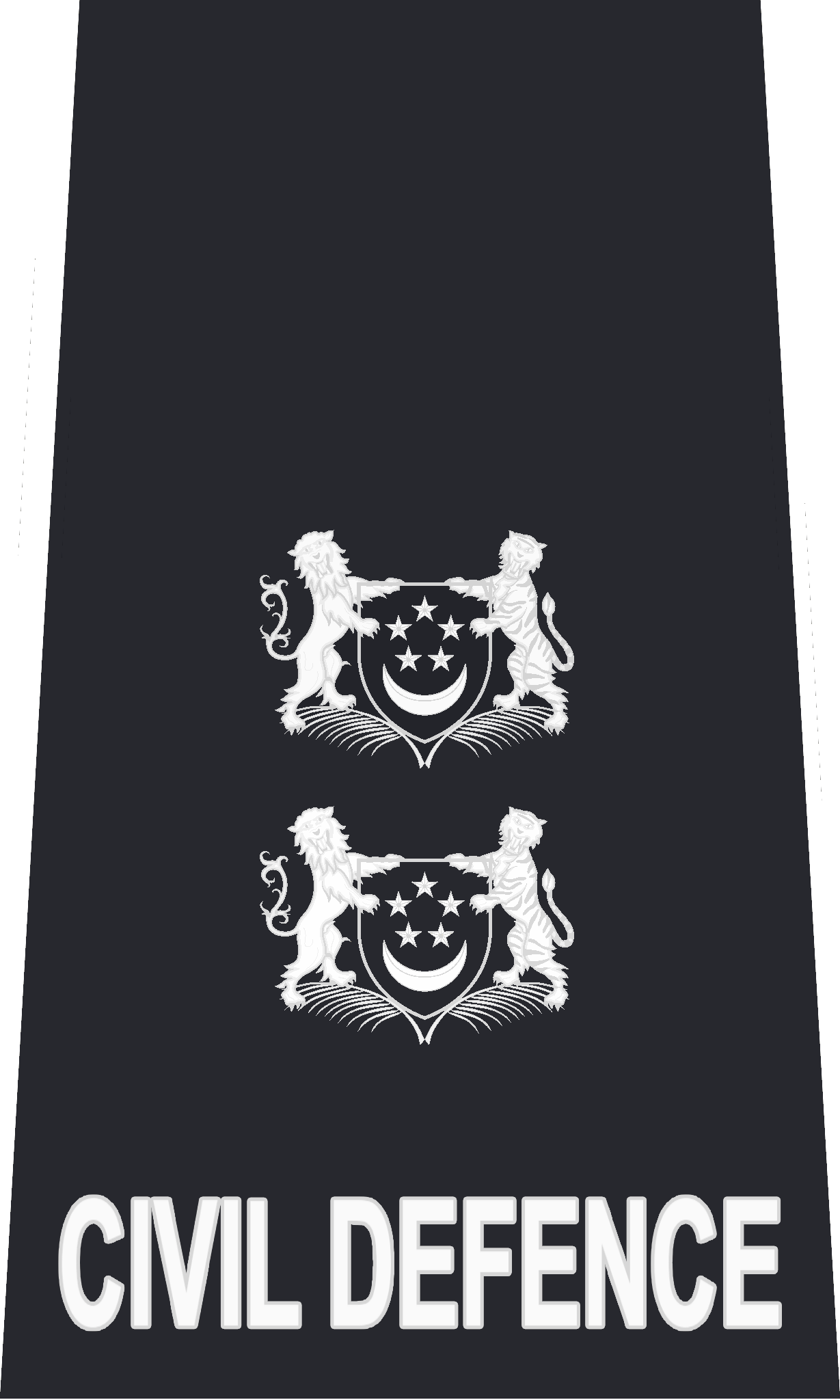
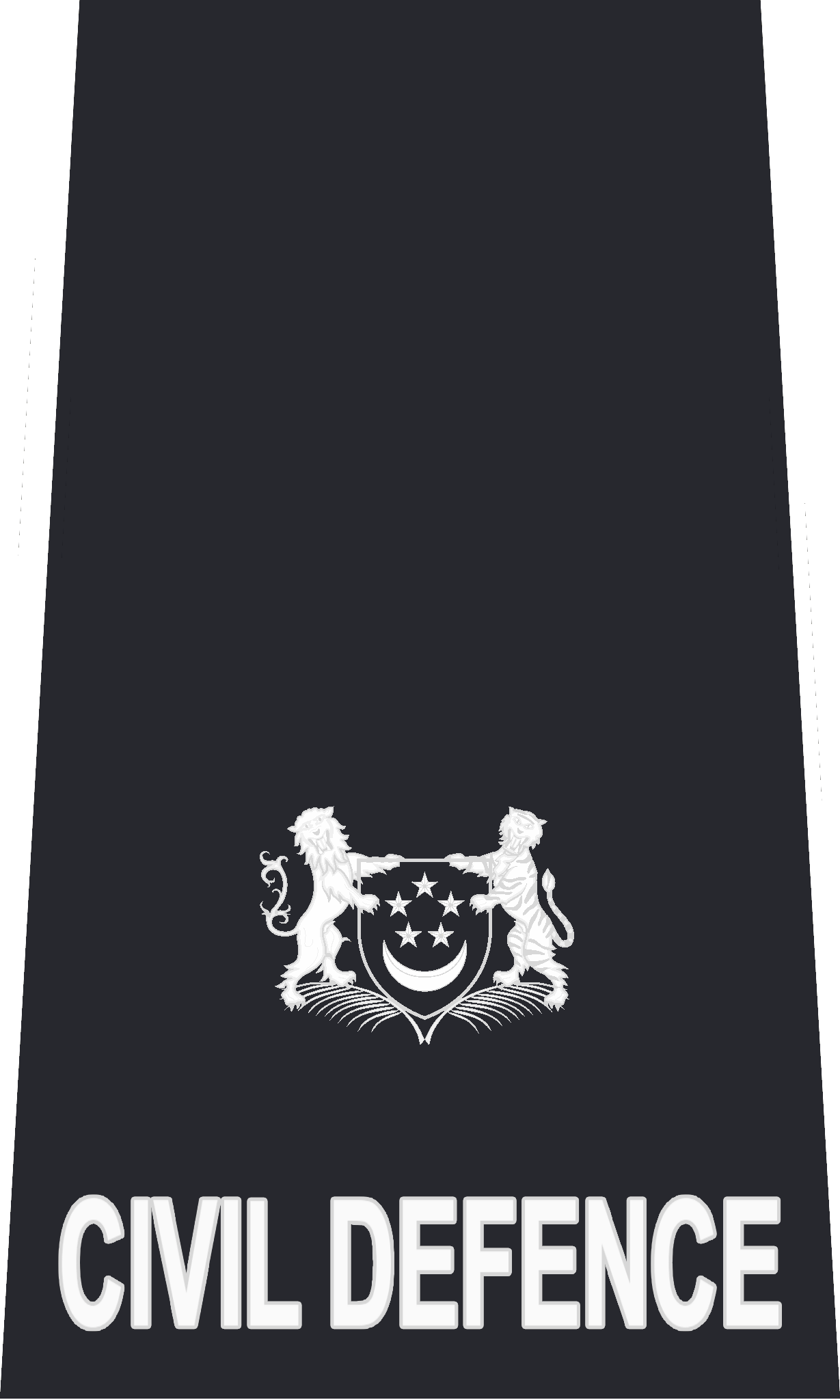
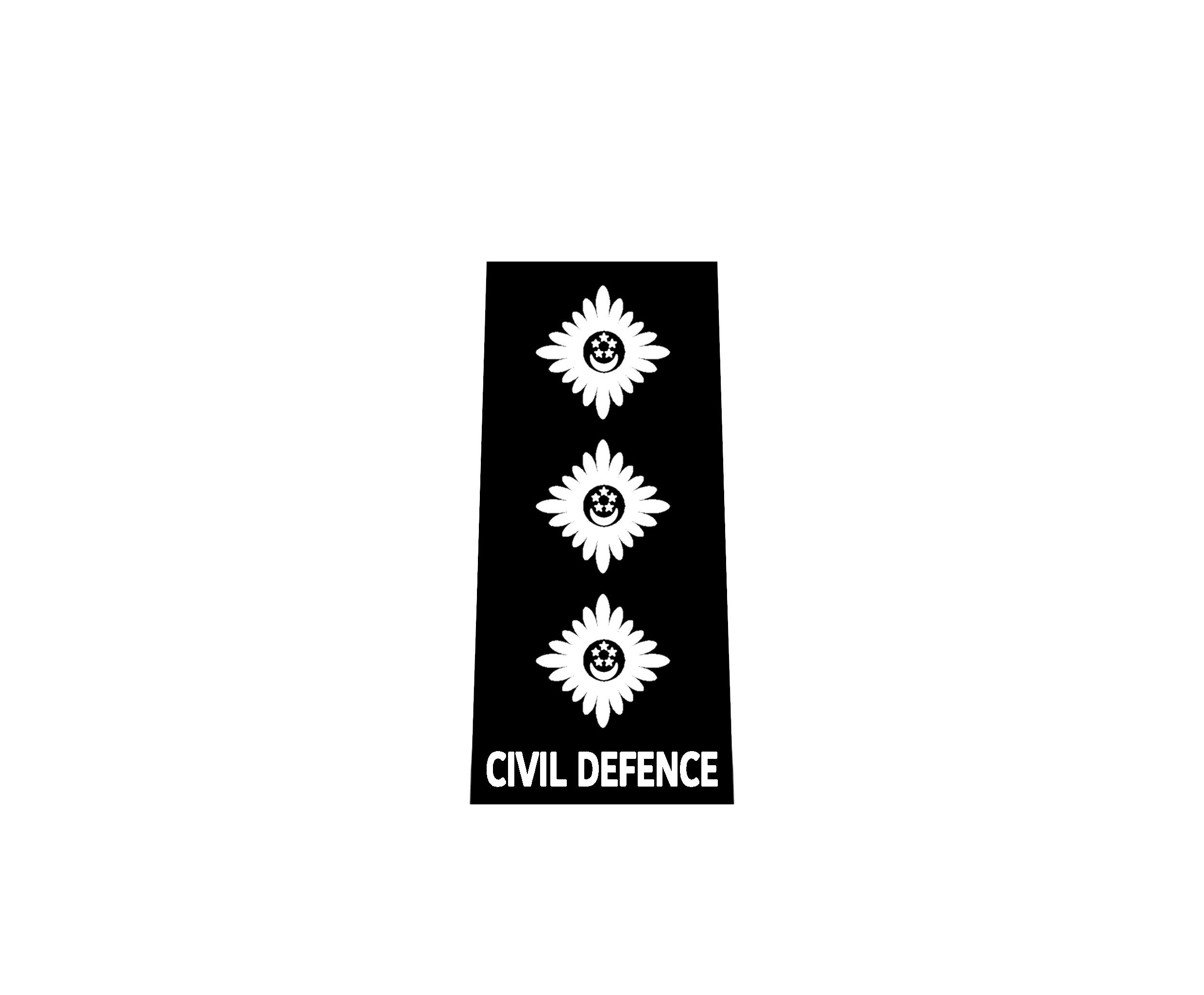
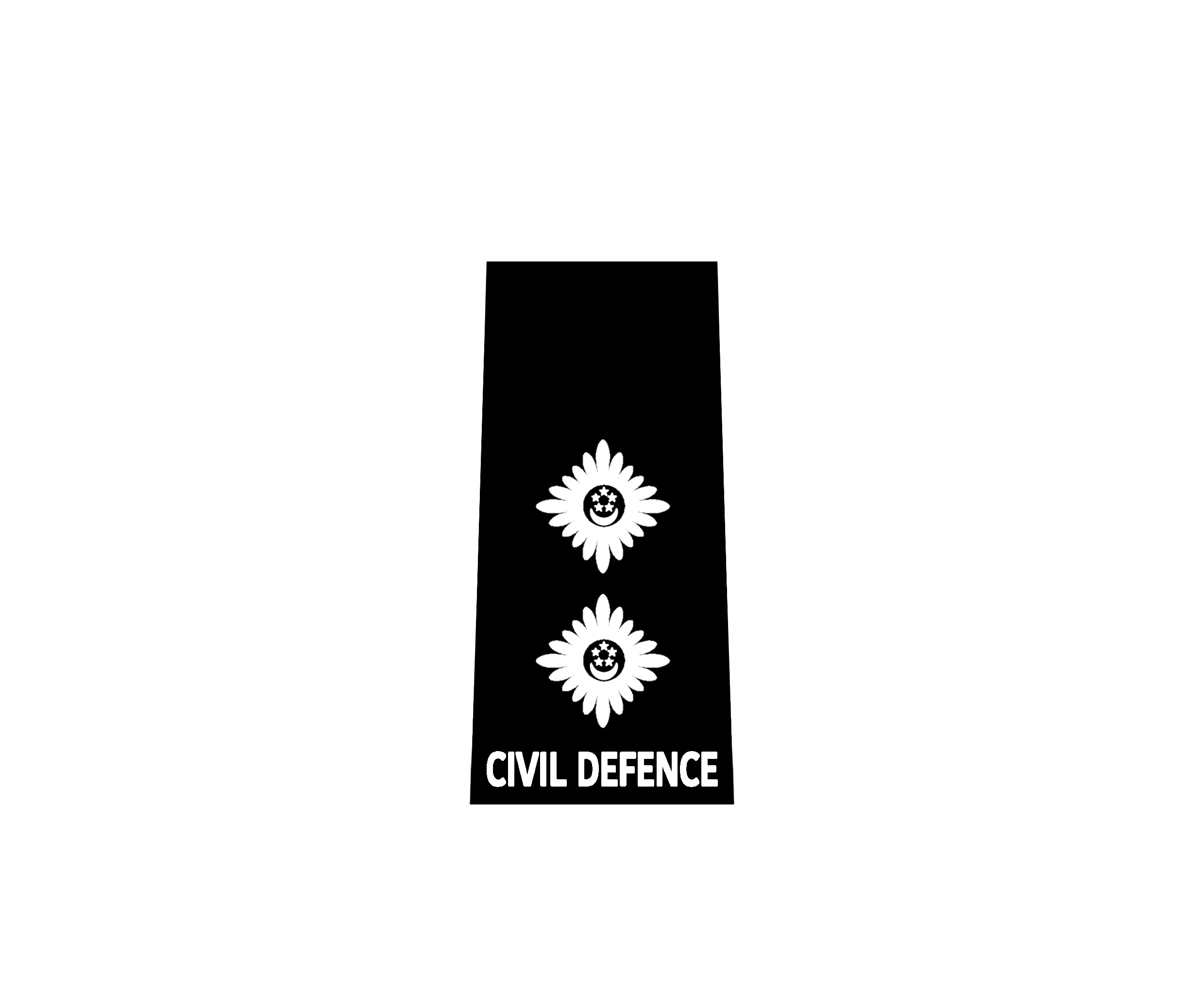
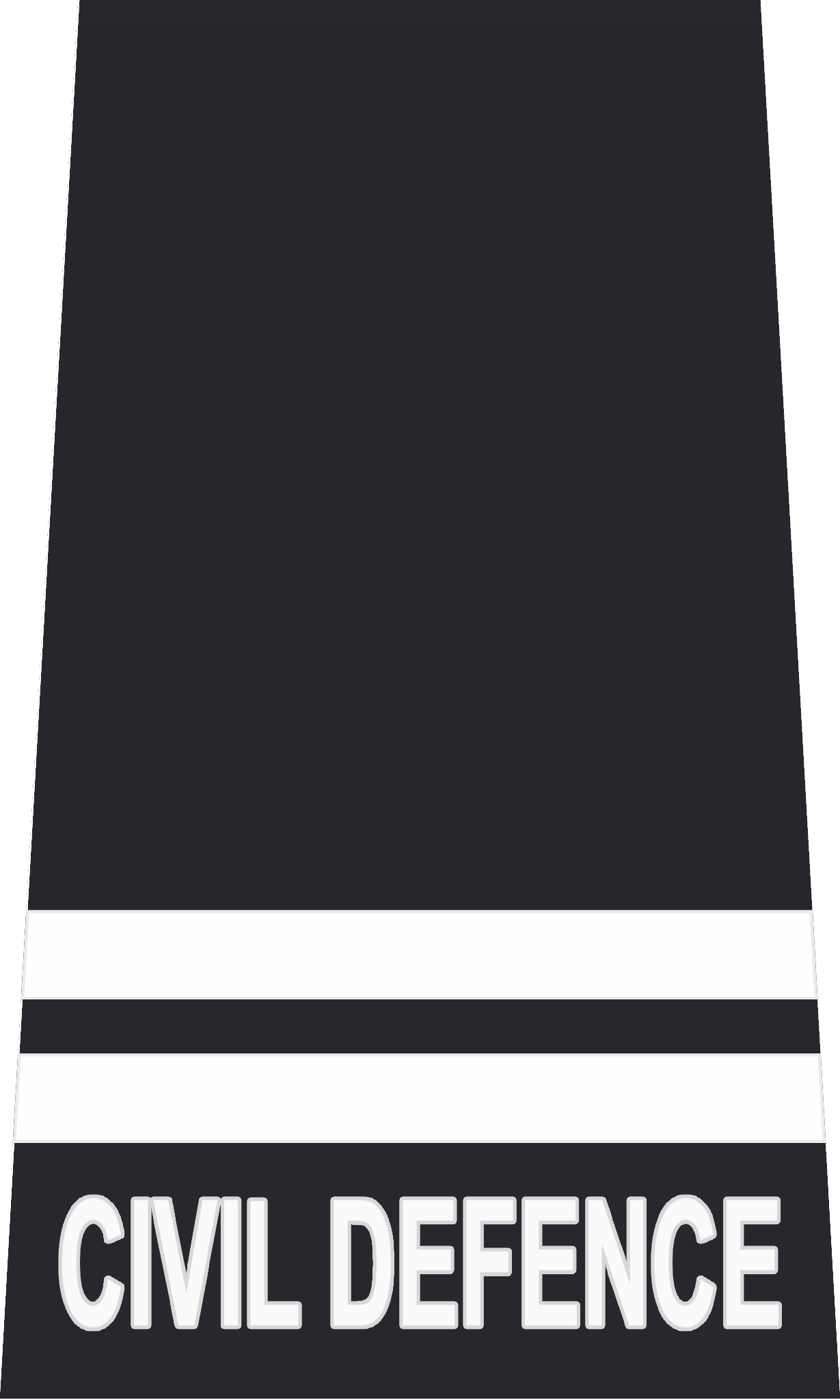
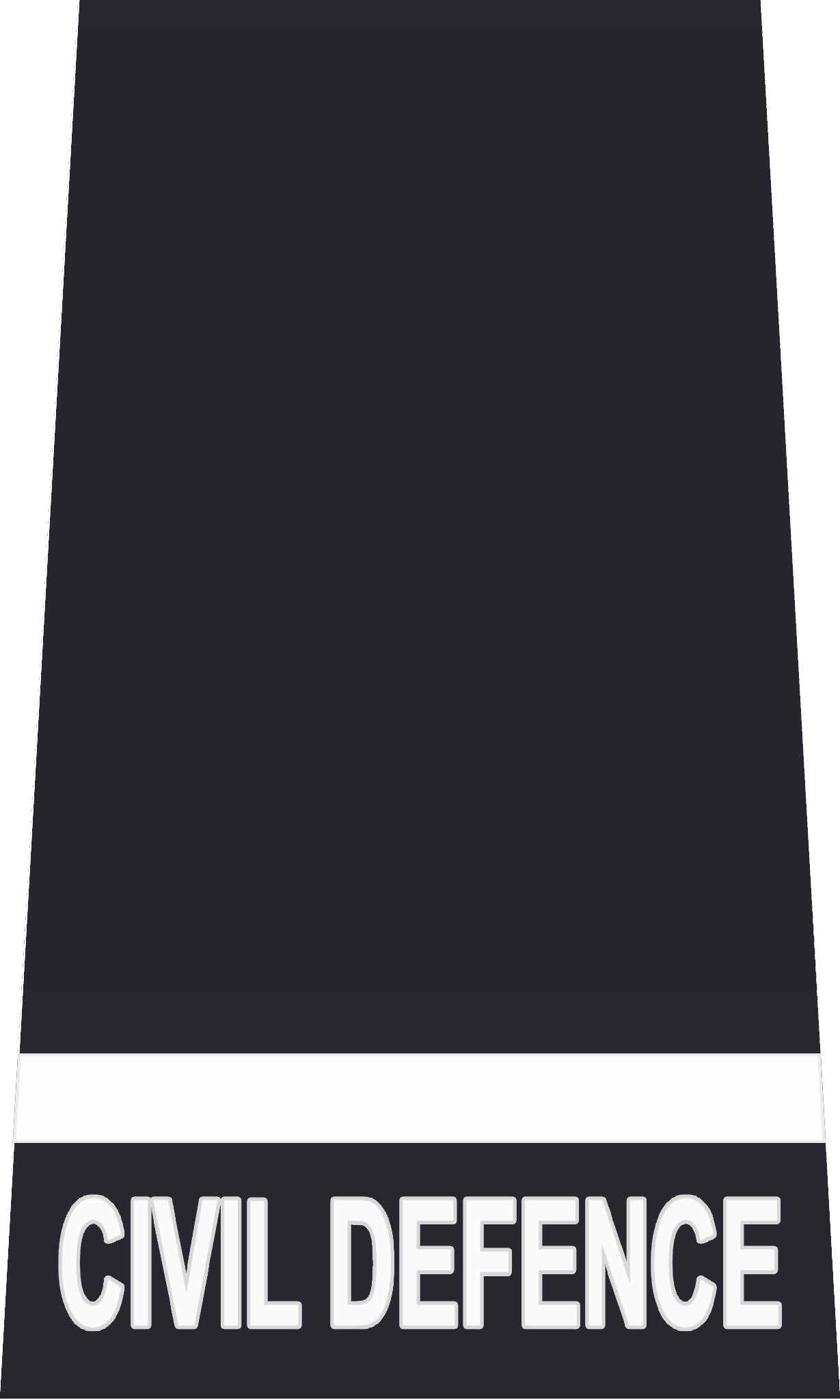
Rank group	General / flag officers				Senior officers			Junior officers
Singapore Civil Defence Force
Singapore Civil Defence Force	Commissioner	Deputy commissioner	Senior assistant commissioner	Assistant commissioner	Colonel	Lieutenant colonel	Major	Captain	Lieutenant / Second lieutenant	Officer cadet

Warrant officers

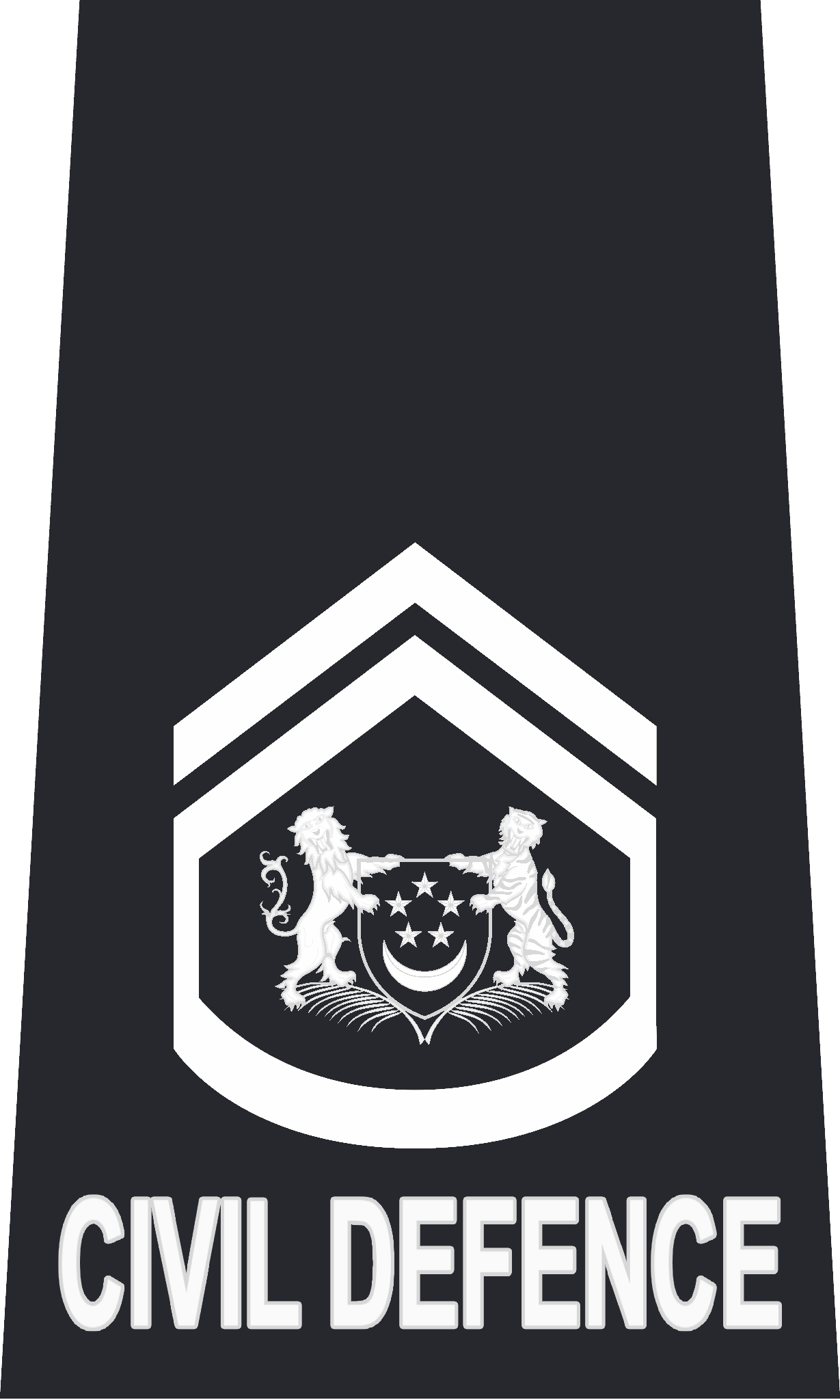
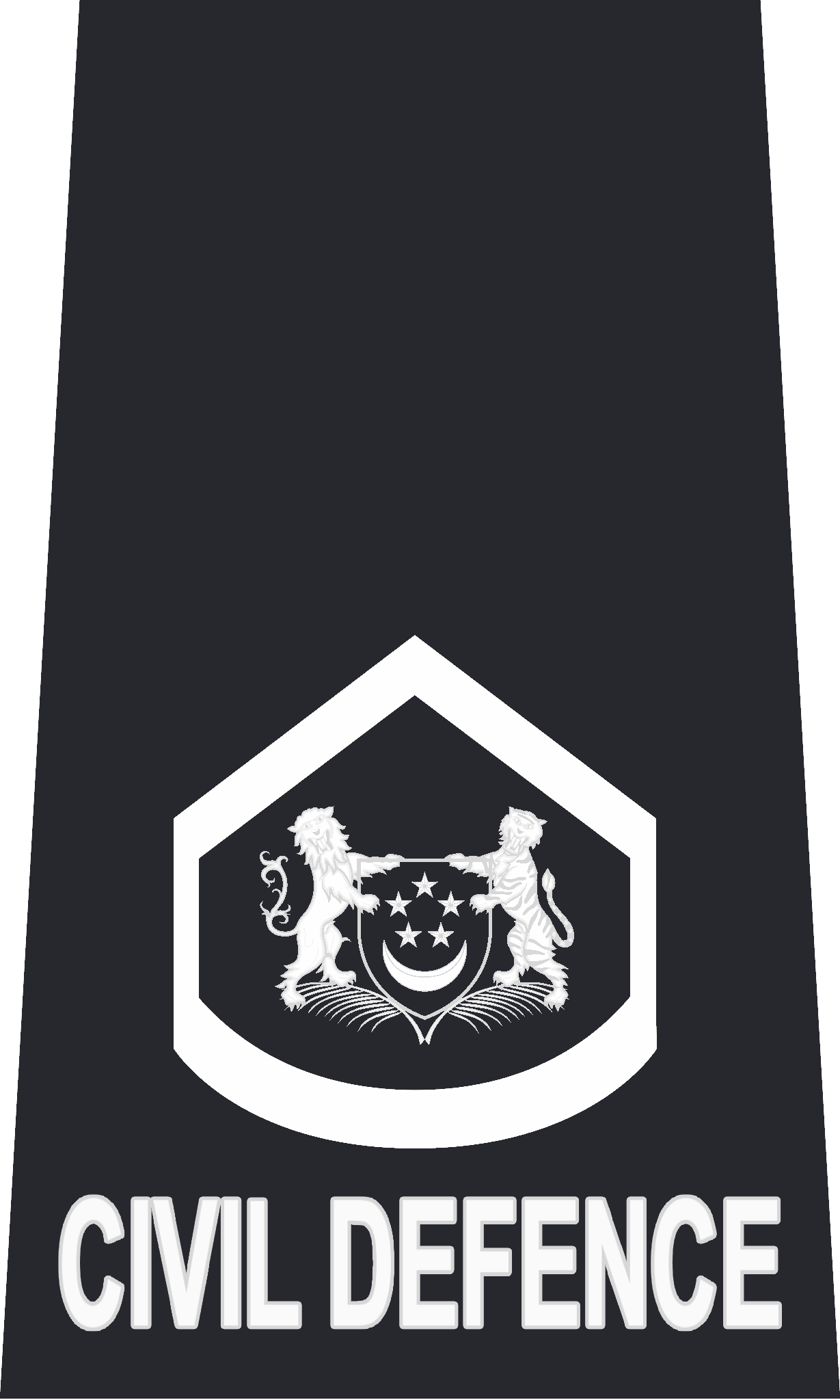
Rank group	Warrant officers
Singapore Civil Defence Force
Singapore Civil Defence Force	Warrant officer 2	Warrant officer 1

Other ranks

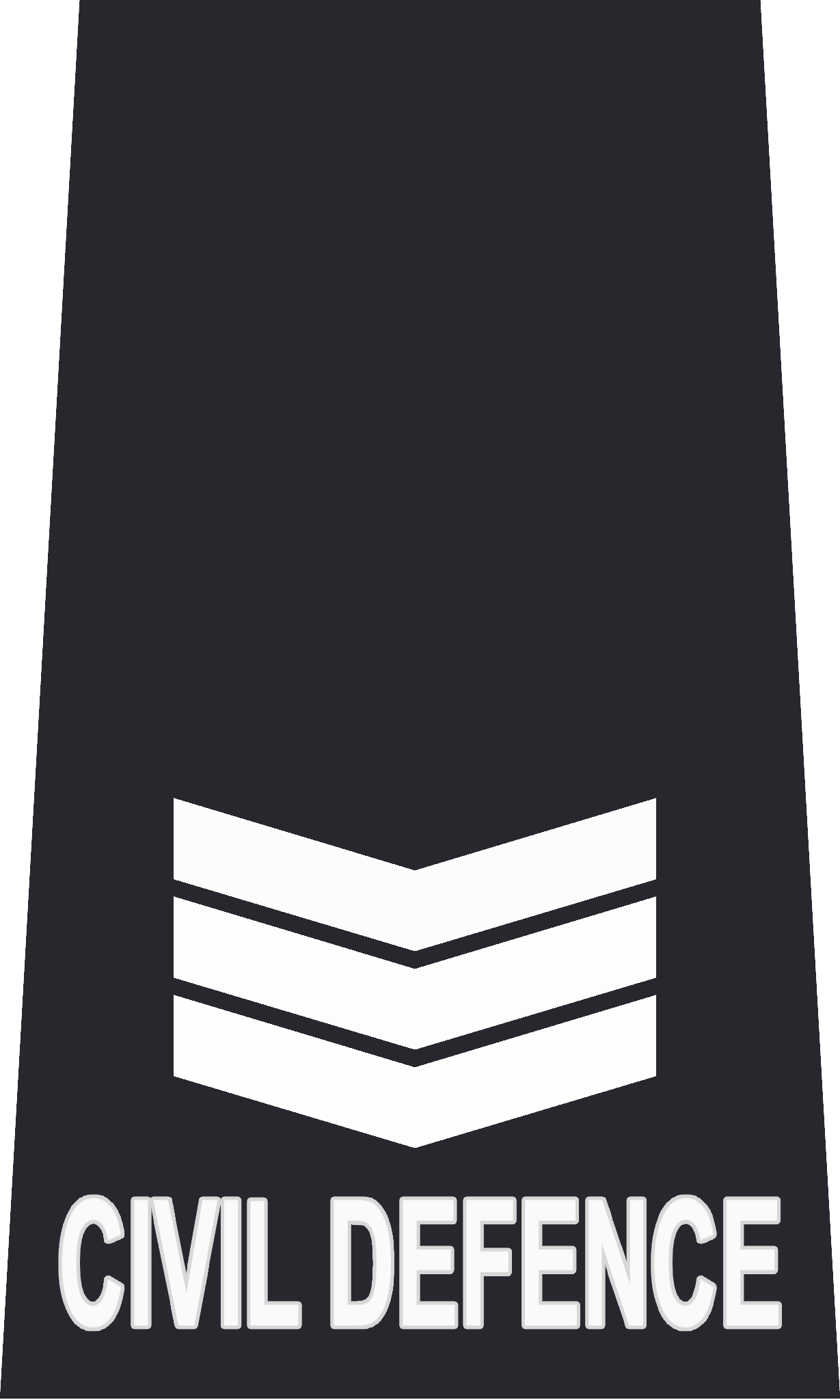
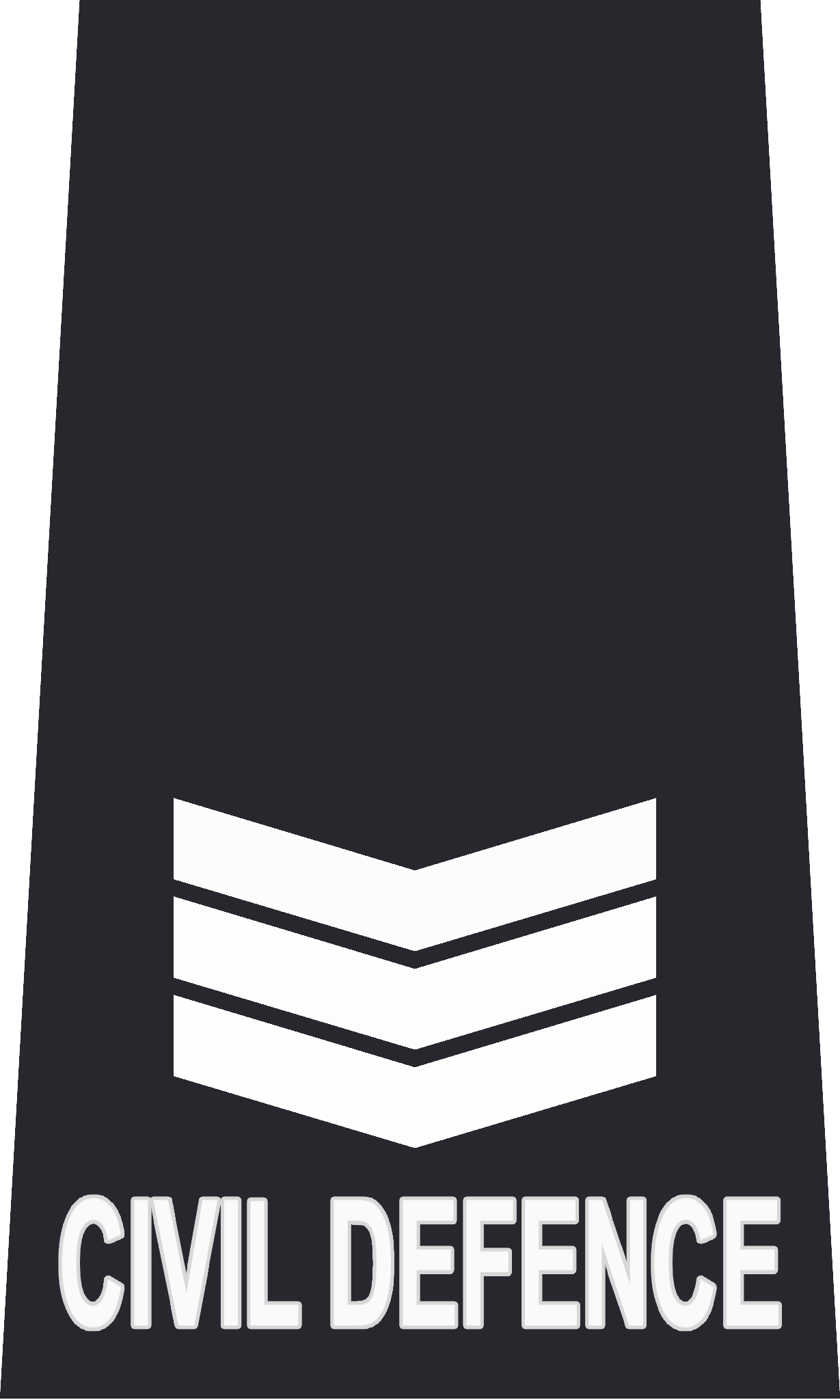
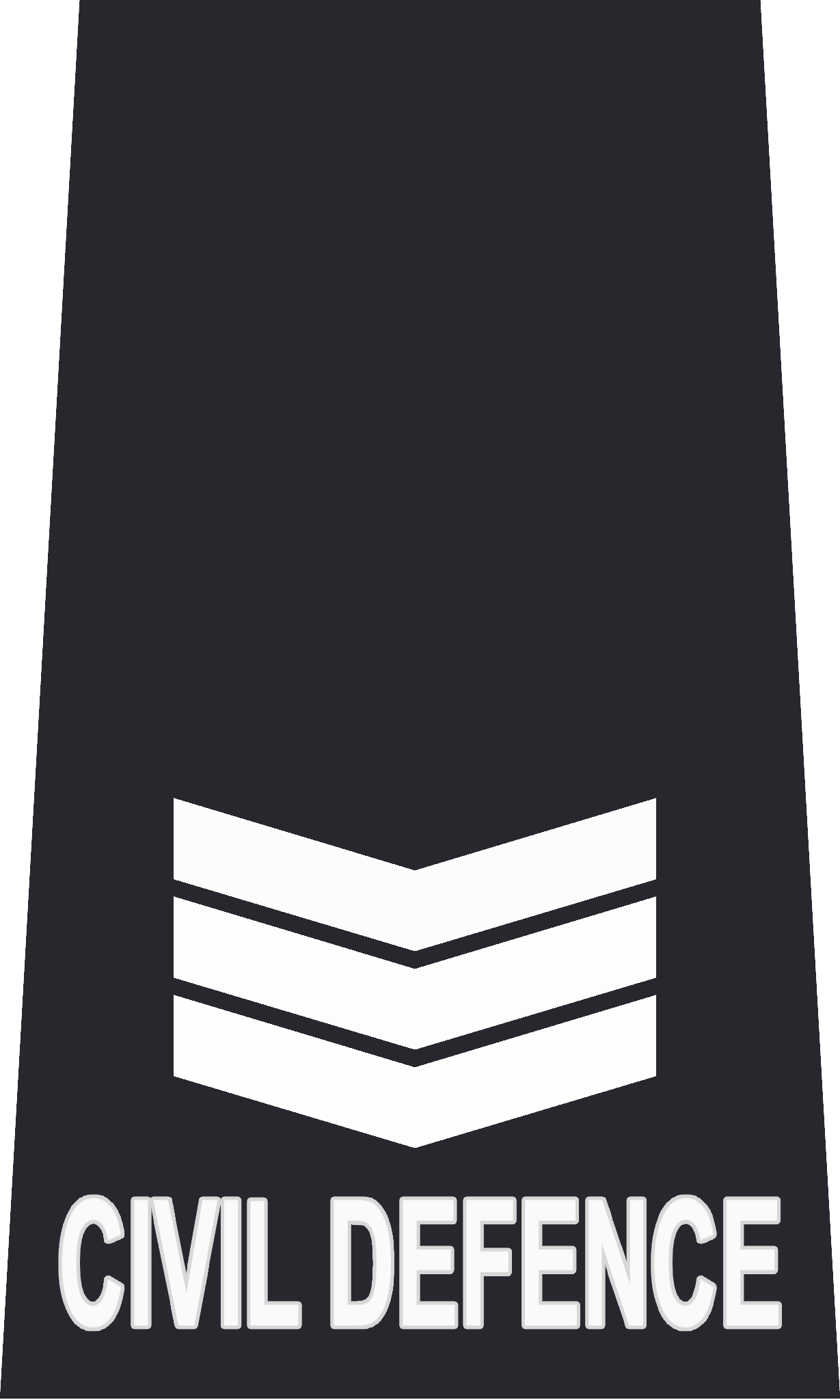
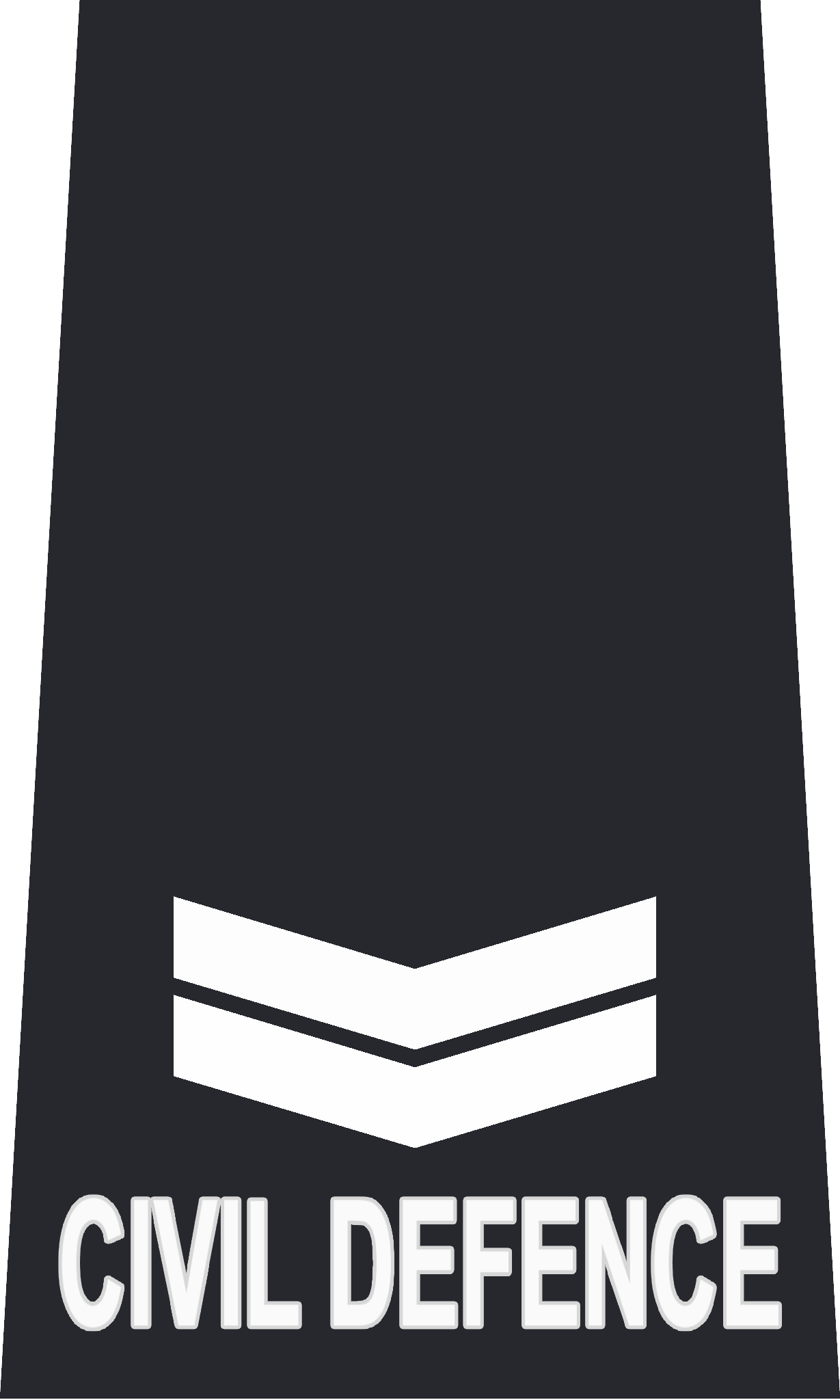
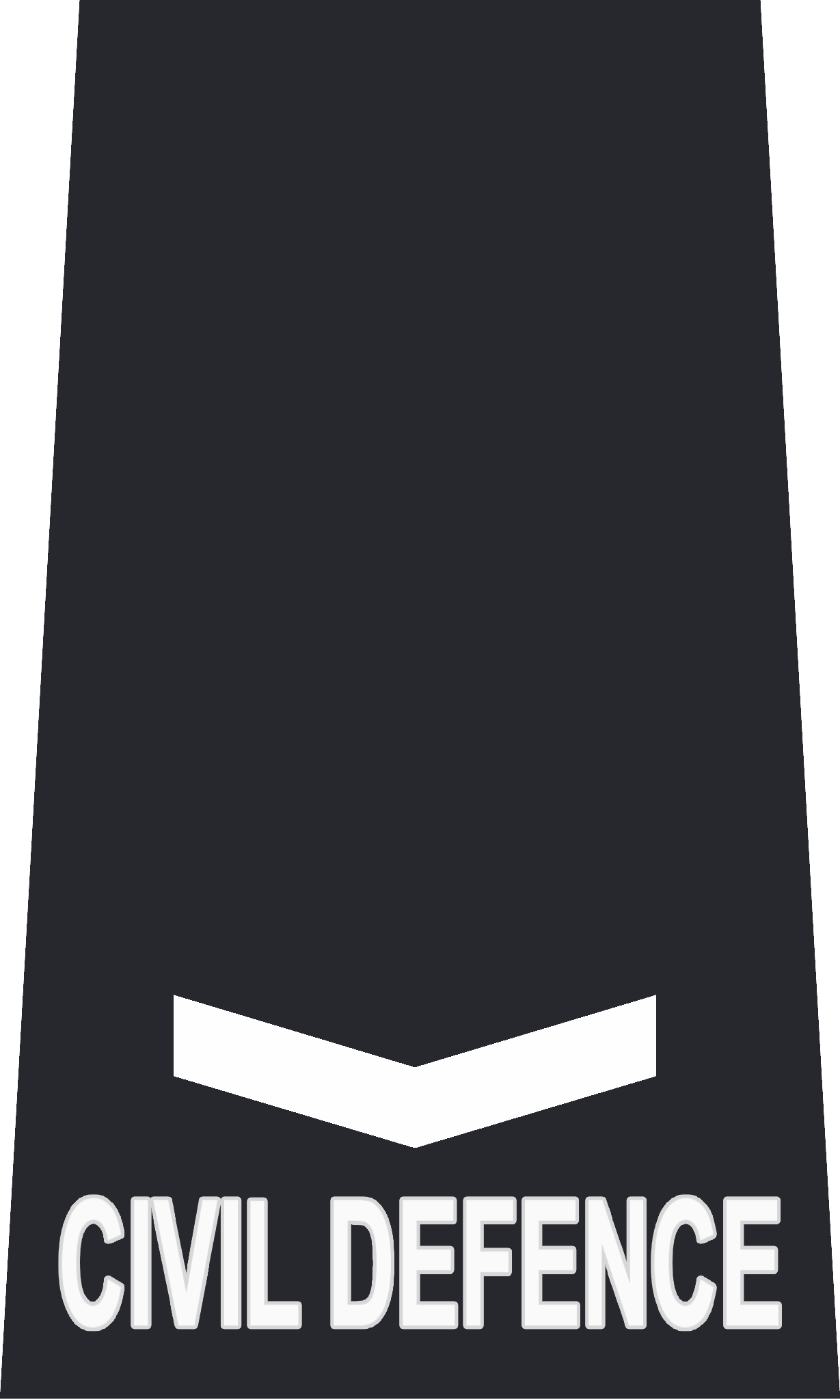
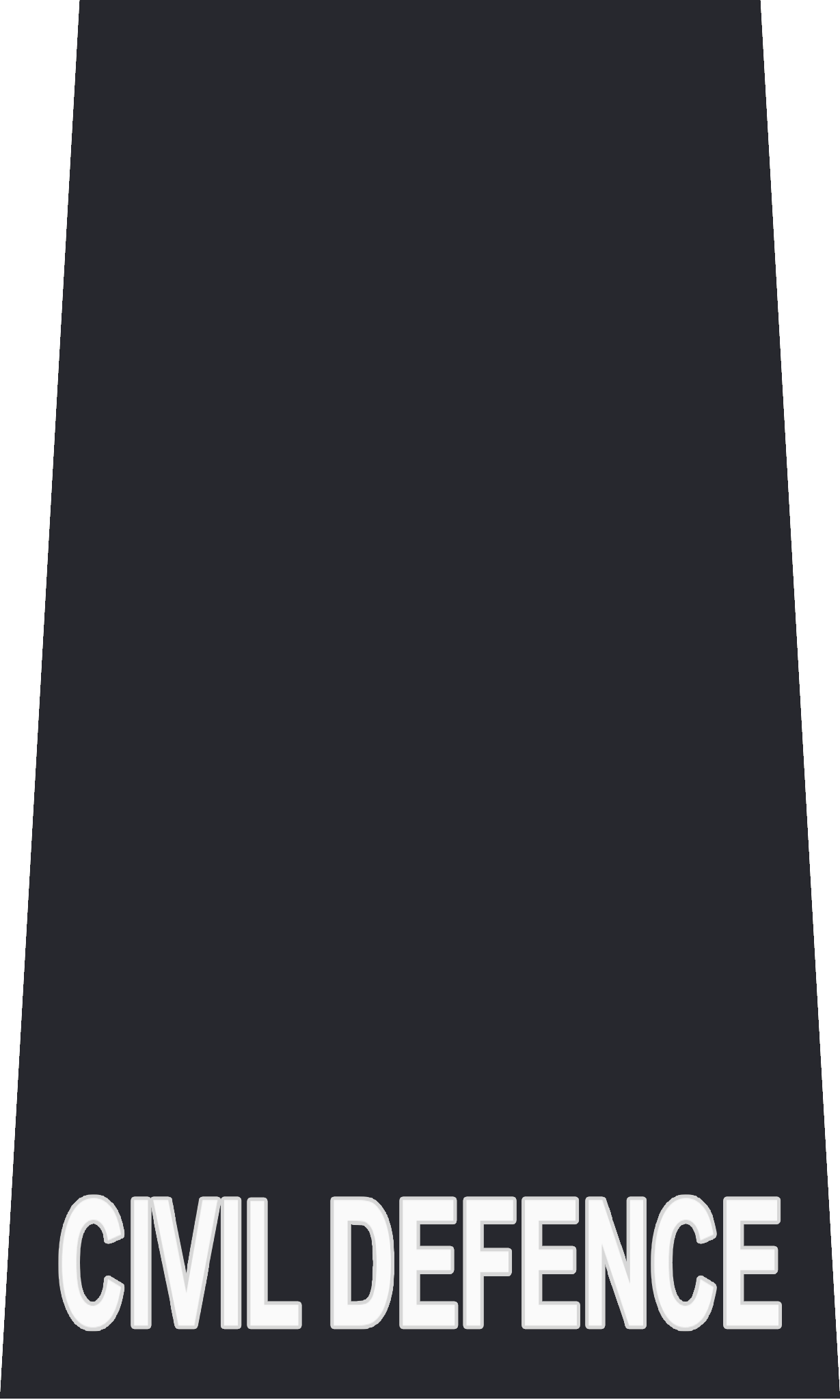
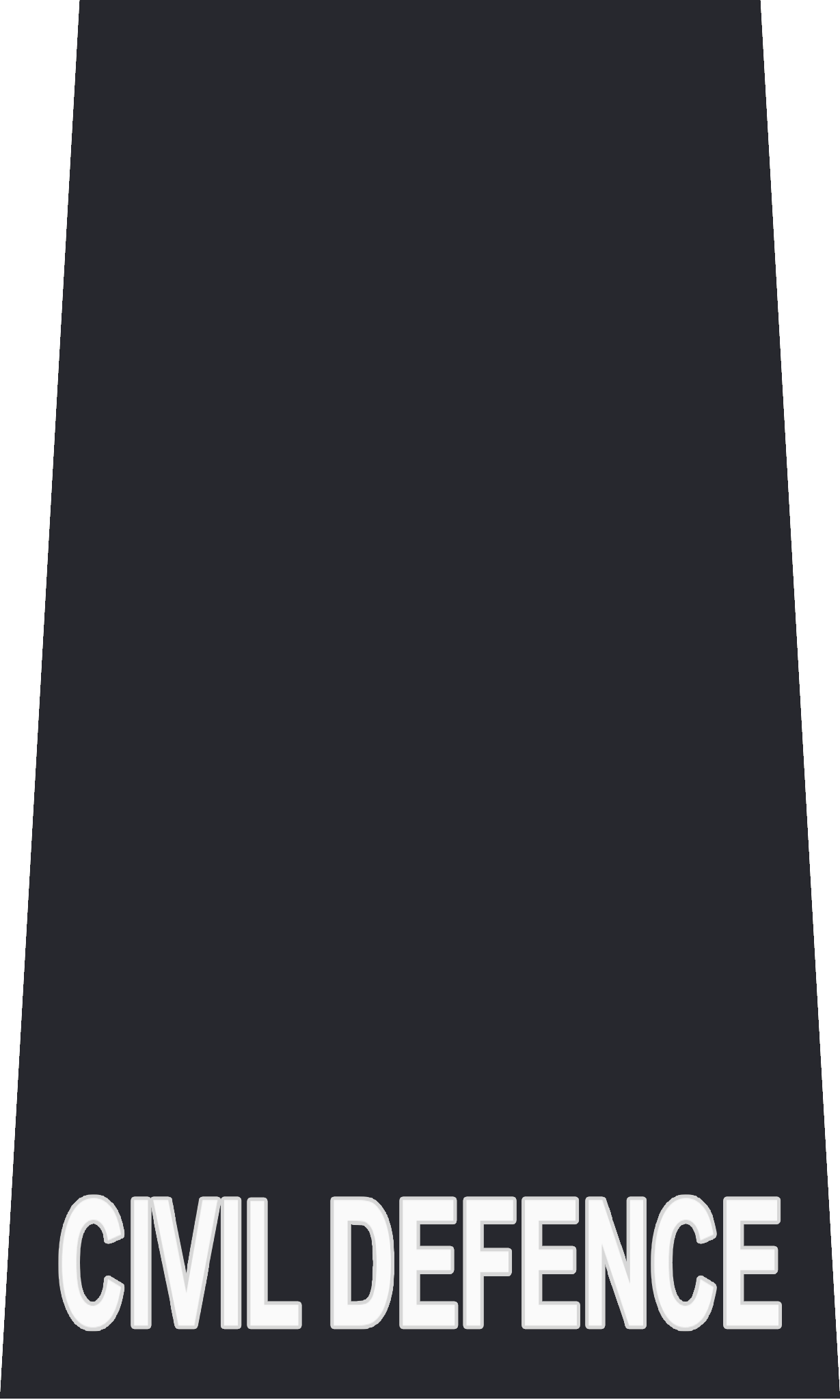
Rank group	Senior NCOs			Junior NCOs		Enlisted
Singapore Civil Defence Force
Singapore Civil Defence Force	Sergeant 3	Sergeant 2	Sergeant 1	Corporal	Lance corporal	Private	Recruit

== In popular culture ==
Fictional television programs:

- Fiery Passion (烈焰焚情), 12 February 1992
- On the Frontline (穿梭生死线), 2000
- Cemas, a 2001 Malay drama
- Life Line, 2005
- Without Warning, 26 October 2006
- Life Line 2, 15 May 2007
- Rescue 995 (九九五), 6 February 2012
- In Safe Hands (守护星), 7 March 2022

== Incidents ==
=== Misconduct ===
On 19 December 2011, former commissioner Peter Lim Sin Pang was arrested on graft charges in connection with an IT contract. Lim was dismissed from service in August 2013. He was sentenced to jail for six months.

On 13 May 2018, full-time national serviceman Corporal Kok Yuen Chin drowned in a fire station's pump well during a ragging incident when his colleagues attempted to celebrate his transition to an operationally ready reservist. Those involved were arrested, charged in court and jailed. Two of them have been dismissed from service.

=== Deaths whilst on duty ===
In late January 2006, SGT Shaik Amran Bin Shaik Jamal from Woodlands Fire Station was killed in a traffic accident when the SCDF Light Fire Attack Vehicle or Red Rhino, was travelling fast towards Woodlands Square.

On 9 December 2022, full-time national serviceman Corporal Edward H Go (Chinese: 吴宏泽; pinyin: Wú Hóngzé) fell unconscious during a firefighting operation at a residential building in Bukit Merah; he was later pronounced dead in hospital. Reported by the press as being the first SCDF member to have died during an operation, Go was posthumously promoted to Sergeant(1) and granted a ceremonial funeral.

SCDF Commissioner Eric Yap paid tribute to SGT(1) Edward Go on his ceremonial funeral and said in his speech that he offered condolences to SGT(1) Go’s family, loved ones and friends, adding that his death has also hit those in the SCDF hard. "We will remember Sgt Edward’s selflessness, professionalism and commitment. For those of us who knew him personally, they will remember how proud he was to be a firefighter,” the commissioner added further.

On 16 May 2024, SCDF regular Captain Tay Xue Qin Kenneth (Chinese: 郑学勤; pinyin: Zhèngxuéqín), 30, who was assigned to SCDF Marine Division died while fighting a fire on a Chinese flagged supertanker ship, Sheng Hang Hua 6, that was anchored in the southwest of Singapore at 12:15 am. While the firefighting operation was ongoing, another team of firefighters entering the engine room to support the operation found Tay lying at the bottom of a ship staircase. Tay was evacuated by SCDF Marine Fire Vessel to Pasir Panjang Ferry Terminal and conveyed by an SCDF ambulance to National University Hospital. He died at around 5:50am. He was reported in the media as the second SCDF personnel to have died during an operation & received a ceremonial funeral.

== See also ==
- Civil defence by nation
- Civil Defence Auxiliary Unit
- Compulsory Fire Service
- National Service in Singapore
- National Civil Defence Cadet Corps
- SAMU, an equivalent organisation in France
