= Landslides in Malaysia =

Natural Disasters

Landslides in Malaysia are frequent natural disasters in Malaysia which occur along hillsides and steep slopes.

== Events ==
- 1 May 1961 – A landslide occurred in Ringlet, Cameron Highlands, Pahang.
- 21 October 1993 – The man-made Pantai Remis landslide caused a new cove to be formed in the coastline.
- 11 December 1993 – 48 people were killed when a block of the Highland Towers collapsed at Taman Hillview, Ulu Klang, Selangor.
- 30 June 1995 – 20 people were killed in the landslide at Genting Highlands slip road near Karak Highway.
- 6 January 1996 – A landslide occurred in the North–South Expressway (NSE) near Gua Tempurung, Perak.
- 29 August 1996 – A mudflow near Pos Dipang Orang Asli settlement in Kampar, Perak, 44 people were killed in this tragedy.
- 15 May 1999 – A landslide near Bukit Antarabangsa, Ulu Klang, Selangor. Several landslides force the evacuation of 1,000 apartment dwellers at Bukit Antarabangsa.
- 20 November 2002 – The bungalow of the Affin Bank chairman General (RtD) Tan Sri Ismail Omar collapsed due to an early morning landslide in Taman Hillview, Ulu Klang, Selangor, with a fatality in his family.
- December 2003 – A rockfall in the New Klang Valley Expressway (NKVE) near the Bukit Lanjan interchange caused the expressway to be closed for more than six months.
- 31 May 2006 – Four persons were killed in the landslides at Kampung Pasir, Ulu Klang, Selangor.
- 26 December 2007 – Two villagers were buried alive in a major landslide, which destroyed nine wooden houses in Lorong 1, Kampung Baru Cina, Kapit, Sarawak.
- 6 December 2008 – the Bukit Antarabangsa landslide occurred on the eastern side of the township of Bukit Antarabangsa, 1.5 kilometers northeast of the Highland Towers. The landslide severely damaged 14 upscale bungalows, killing four and injuring fifteen.
- 12 February 2009 – one contract worker was killed in a landslide at the construction site for a 43-storey condominium in Bukit Ceylon, Kuala Lumpur.
- 21 May 2011 – 16 people mostly 15 children and a caretaker of an orphanage were killed in a landslide caused by heavy rains at the Children's Hidayah Madrasah Al-Taqwa orphanage in FELCRA Semungkis, Hulu Langat, Selangor.
- 29 Dec 2012 – 46 homes are evacuated in Bkt Setiawangsa, Kuala Lumpur as a result of the collapse of a concrete embankment in Bukit Setiawangsa due to land erosion.
- 18 November 2014 – A landslide, caused by heavy rain, forced the closure of the Km 4.2 of the Genting Sempah–Genting Highlands Highway heading towards Genting Highlands, Pahang.
- 5 June 2015 – A M_{w} 6.0 earthquake in Sabah triggers major landslides on Mount Kinabalu, killing 18, injuring 11 and leaving many people stranded.
- 26 November 2016 – A landslide occurred in Taman Idaman, Serendah, Selangor. About 340 civilians are evacuated.
- 19 October 2018 – A landslide occurred in Paya Terubong, George Town, Penang.
- 7 November 2019 – A landslide occurred at Genting Highland road, the landslide affected a portion of the Jalan Genting-Amber Court slip road, and not the primary access road to the resort. No one was injured in the incident.
- 23 March 2020 – A landslide occurred at Mount Jerai, near Gurun, Kedah, killing two people due to illegal excavation activity.
- 29 May 2020 – A landslide occurred at Taman Kelab Ukay, Bukit Antarabangsa, Ulu Klang, Selangor due to continuous rain, resulting in soil movement.
- 10 November 2020 – A landslide, caused by heavy rain. two people were killed at the Banjaran Hotsprings Retreat, Tambun, Ipoh, Perak.
- 21 December 2020 – A landslide occurred at Raub-Bukit Fraser Road, about 165 kilometres from here, has been fully closed due to a rockslide believed to have happened on the morning. No one was injured in the incident.
- 29 December 2020 – A landslide occurred at Damansara Utama, Selangor due to the broken pipe incident and water disruption.
- 1 January 2021 – Two landslides occurred at the Segamat-Kuantan Highway, near Pekan, Pahang.
- 12 January 2021 – A landslide occurred at Padawan, Sarawak. A grandmother, together with her daughter, saved her four grandchildren from being buried alive when part of their house collapsed in Kampung Garung at 40 kilometres of Jalan Puncak Borneo near Kuching city.
- 2 December 2021 – A landslide, caused by continuous rainfall. Two vehicles, a lorry and a multi-purpose vehicle are believed buried alive at Simpang Pulai-Blue Valley road near Cameron Highlands. The victims were identified as Muhammad Hafiz Hamdi, 31, from Tanjung Piandang in Kerian, who was driving a lorry carrying vegetable, and Tan Chee Heng, 36, from Klang, Selangor, who was driving a MPV.
- 10 March 2022 – A landslide occurred from Taman Bukit Permai. Four were killed when the landslide raged through Jalan Teratai 1/2J, Taman Bukit Teratai near Ampang, Selangor.
- 16 December 2022 – A landslide occurred on the campsite in an organic farm near the Jalan Batang Kali-Genting Highlands in Batang Kali, Selangor. With 31 people were killed and 7 people injured, it is the one of worst landslides occurred in Malaysia.
- 25 April 2023 – A landslide occurred at Malaysian Anti-Corruption Commission Academy, Bukit Tunku, Kuala Lumpur due to the broken pipe, 76 people are evacuated.
- 3 May 2023 – A security guard were killed in a guard post from a landslide near Wisma YPR in Seputeh, Kuala Lumpur.
- 28 June 2023 – A landslide occurred at Simpang Pulai-Blue Valley road near Cameron Highlands due to heavy rain.
- 16 December 2023 – A landslide occurred in Taman Wawasan, Puchong, Selangor due to heavy rain.
- 20 January 2024 – Habu-Boh Tea Road are closed due to landslide, near Ringlet, Cameron Highlands. No one was injured in the incident.
- 26 January 2024 – A landslide occurred at Kampung Raja-Blue Valley, Cameron Highlands, killing five Myanmar nationals.
- 1 July 2024 – A non-stop rain lead to landslides along the Penampang–Tambunan Highway, in Penampang District, Sabah, causing the road to also close as well as affecting travel time between Kota Kinabalu and Tenom.
- 15 October 2024 – A landslide occurred in Taman Melawati, Ulu Kelang, Selangor due to heavy rain.
- 6 January 2025 – A landslide occurred in Kampung Raja, Cameron Highlands due to heavy rain in early morning.
- 17 January 2025 – A landslide occurred in Genting Highlands due to heavy rain. No one was injured in the incident.
- 1 April 2025 – A landslide occurred in Sungai Tua-Ulu Yam road; caused a tree to fall, partially obstructing the road.
