= Special Malaysia Disaster Assistance and Rescue Team =

Malaysian disaster relief and rescue task force

Special Malaysian Disaster Assistance and Rescue Team
- Pasukan Mencari dan Menyelamat Khas Malaysia
- SMART Task Force crest
- Founded: 18 May 1994; 32 years ago
- Country: Malaysia
- Branch: Malaysian Armed Forces; Royal Malaysian Police; Fire and Rescue Department of Malaysia
- Type: Rescue squad
- Role: Air-sea rescue Cave rescue CBRNE consequence management CBRN defense Conducting disaster relief and rescue operations locally and internationally Disaster response Emergency management Medical evacuation Mountain rescue Search and rescue Tactical emergency medical services Urban search and rescue
- Size: 134 Personnel (September 2019)
- Part of: National Disaster Management Agency (NADMA)
- Garrison/HQ: Pulau Meranti, Puchong, Selangor
- Colours: Unit colours: Yellow, Red, White and Blue; Beret: Dark blue

Commanders
- Commander: Mohd Khairul Jamil

The Special Malaysian Disaster Assistance and Rescue Team (SMART; Malay: Pasukan Mencari dan Menyelamat Khas Malaysia, Jawi: ڤاسوكن منچاري دان مڽلامت خاص مليسيا) is a disaster relief and rescue task force established under the National Security Council based on the approval of the Cabinet on 18 May 1994. The SMART task force is a United Nations INSARAG certified Heavy USAR (Urban Search and Rescue team) in June 2016.

The team draws its members from the Malaysian Armed Forces, Royal Malaysian Police, and Fire and Rescue Department of Malaysia.

== History ==
Malaysia has been through three major disasters since 1988 which is Sultan Abdul Halim ferry terminal bridge collapse in the year 1988, Bright Sparklers Fireworks disaster in 1991 and Klang Port Chong Hong 3 Tanker Explosion in 1992. The pinnacle of disaster in Malaysia happens in the year 1993 when the Highland Towers collapse in Ulu Klang, outskirt of Kuala Lumpur. The tragedy came to world attention in which five countries sent aid workers to help. They are from the USA, Great Britain, Détachement d'intervention catastrophes aéromobile (DICA) from France, Japan Disaster Relief Team (JDRT) from Japan and Disaster Assistance and Rescue Team (DART) from Singapore. The JDRT led by Kiyoshi Shidara then donates their sophisticated equipment to Malaysia.

Following the collapse of the Highland Towers tragedy on 11 December 1993, Malaysia intends to establish a disaster rescue team based on the Japanese JDRT. The Cabinet Committee then convened on 18 May 1994 and approved the establishment of the SMART team under the management of the National Security Council. The SMART will draw its members from three government departments: the Fire and Rescue Department of Malaysia (FRDM), Royal Malaysian Police (RMP) and the Malaysian Armed Forces (MAF).

On 1 August 1996, SMART was established with a strength of 85 personnel including officers. SMART is put under the National Security Council.

On 1 January 2004, SMART was expanded to 104 personnel.

On 1 June 2009, SMART moved to new headquarters in Pulau Meranti, Puchong.

On 1 June 2014, SMART expanded to 141 personnel and their salary grade was standardised.

In May 2015, SMART applied for INSARAG certification.

On 1 October 2015, SMART was transferred to NADMA to improve disaster management coordination and response.

On 5 June 2016, SMART received INSARAG certification. With this certification, SMART is the second Disaster Relief team to be certified in Southeast Asia after the Singaporean Disaster Assistance and Rescue Team.

On 11 April 2019, SMART was chosen to become a mentor to the Brunei rescue team. SMART will assist the team until they get their INSARAG certification.

== Functions ==
Under National Security Council Directive No.19 and Directive No.20, there are four main functions of SMART outlined by the Malaysian Government:

1. Act to perform search and rescue duties which the task is beyond the capabilities of existing rescue agencies.
2. Conduct search and rescue operations which require high expertise and sophisticated equipment.
3. Responsible in the event which is expected to be a major disaster and involving many victims.
4. Act to help in overseas disasters when directed to do so by the Prime Minister.

== Identity ==
Dark Blue Beret

All SMART members wear a navy blue beret.

Red Helmet

SMART team wear the same red helmet worn by FRDM Special Forces.

Blue Uniform

All SMART members wear a blue uniform to differentiate them from other rescue teams.

Logo

Four white water drop shapes

Symbolises the four roles of SMART which are:
- Search
- Rescue
- Assist rescue efforts
- Provide rescue assistance overseas

Four yellow coloured sharp shapes

Represent four types of disastrous threats:
- Land
- Sea
- Air
- Disaster at overseas

Four red coloured round shape

Symbolises the four key capabilities of SMART:
- Moving fast
- Always ready
- Move within 24 hours to help either local or overseas
- Special expertise in technical assistance

Center of the target shape

Symbolising always in a state ready to be moved within 24 hours notice.

Upward pointing arrow shape

Symbolises the power or effort toward the success of the rescue or describe the hardships to produce something of a pleasure.

Hand with thumb up shape

Symbolises the process of handling or lifting something out. Used to reveal:
- Help
- Ability
- Efficiency
- Success
- Good deed
- Brilliance
- Power/skills

Yellow, red, white and blue colours

Colours on the flag of Malaysia

== Selections and training ==
SMART only opens its membership to personnel from the Fire and Rescue Department of Malaysia, Royal Malaysian Police and Malaysian Army.

SMART always trains together with other government agencies and departments. They conduct training for private sectors and educational institutions. SMART works with the Singaporean Disaster Assistance and Rescue Team (DART) and they always train together.

=== At the original department ===
The application for SMART can only be applied by personnel from the Fire and Rescue Department of Malaysia, Royal Malaysia Police and Malaysian Army from their respective bases/HQ.

1. Priority shall be given to candidates who are really interested from respectively department or agency's announcement.
2. Physically and mentally healthy, and passed a medical examination from the government or military hospital.
3. Have a good track record and is certified free of disciplinary action.

=== SMART Stage ===
All selected candidates into the SMART Stage will be a test based on:

Individual Physical Proficiency Test (IPPT)

Candidates will undergo series of circuit consist of sit up, pulls up, standing board jump, 4 x 10 m (33 ft) shuttle run and 2.4 km (1.5 mi), 7 km (4.3 mi) and 18 km (11 mi) run.

Phobia of height test

10 m (33 ft) platform diving, 300 m (980 ft) swimming freestyle and five minutes float conducted at PULAPOL, Semarak Street, Kuala Lumpur.

Phobia of blood and corpses test

The test will be assessed by the Kuala Lumpur Hospital Forensic Unit.

Phobia of dark and confined space test

The test session will be done in 'Smoke Gallery' at Fire and Rescue Academy of Malaysia (FRAM), Kuala Kubu Bharu, Selangor.

Final interview

Candidates will be interviewed by the board of interviewer consist of T/SUM, BPB, BKP and Commander of SMART.

=== Basic Course ===
==== SMART Special Course (11 Weeks) ====
This arduous course lasts for 11 weeks. In this course, trainees will be trained hard at any time. Among the module that's been taught during the course is; Medical, Urban search and rescue (USAR), Road Traffic Accident (RTA), High Angle & Rope rescue, HAZMAT and many more. Also, the trainees are required to undergo physical training every day as well as individual and team tests such as obstacle courses and endurance circuit. IPPT is also conducted every Friday throughout the course and the final test; trainers will be tested with 30 km (19 mi) casualty evacuation through hilly terrain around Kuala Kubu Bharu.

==== Bronze Medallion Rescue Course (3 Weeks) ====
This is a three-week military style water rescue course organised by SMART in cooperation with the Life Saving Society Malaysia (Malay: Persatuan Penyelamat Kelemasan Malaysia; PPKM). This course is a must for the SMART and Malaysian Lifeguard members.

In the final examination, trainees need to pass a few tests in order to get the Bronze Medallion Certificate:

1. 50 m (160 ft) swimming and 50 m (160 ft) Chin-tow circuit.
2. 50 m (160 ft) swimming and 50 m (160 ft) Rope-towing circuit.
3. 20 m (66 ft) rope throwing.
4. 25 m (82 ft) fully clothes Cross-chest towing.
5. Combine rescue.

===== International Life Saver Certificate =====
International Life Saver (ILS) is an international certificate for water rescue. Bronze Medallion Rescue Course trainee needs to take three more tests to get ILS certificate. The three tests are:

1. 100 m (330 ft) swimming under 1 minute and 40 seconds.
2. 300 m (980 ft) swimming under 9 minutes.
3. 25 m (82 ft) diving underwater under one breath.

==== First Responder Life Support (FRLS) Course ====
FRLS Course is a two-level paramedic management course and usually organised at Malaysian Civil Defense Force Academy (ALPHA).

At level 1, trainees will learn basic paramedic techniques and skills. At level 2, trainees will learn how to differentiate trauma patients from other patients and how to treat them.

=== Advance Course ===
- CBRN
- Abseiling / Rappelling
- Underwater Rescue
- Landslide, Tunnel and Trench Rescue
- Cave Rescue
- Net Rescue
- Cable Car Rescue
- Driving Technique Course

== Missions ==
The missions that SMART have participated in includes:

- 1996: Search and Rescue operation for Genting Highland bus accidents, Pahang.
- 1996: Search and Rescue mission for Greg Storm in Keningau, Sabah.
- 1997: Rescue and firefighting mission for Indonesian forest fires in Sumatra and Kalimantan, Indonesia.
- 1999: Search and Rescue operation for İzmit Earthquake disaster in Golchuk, Turkey.
- 2001: Search and Rescue operation at Mount Kinabalu, Sabah.
- 2001: Search and Rescue mission for Gujarat Earthquake disaster in Gujarat, India.
- 2002: Search and Rescue mission for Simunjan landslide incident in Simunjan, Sarawak.
- 2002: Search and Rescue mission for Taman Hillview landslide incident in June 2002 in Ulu Klang, Selangor. This incident happens near to Highland Tower.
- 2003: Search and Rescue mission for The Curve building collapse in Mutiara Damansara, Petaling Jaya, Selangor.
- 2004: Search and Rescue mission for Taman Harmoni landslide in Gombak, Selangor.
- 2004: Search and Rescue mission for Indian Ocean earthquake and tsunami disaster in Acheh, Indonesia.
- 2005: Search and Rescue operation for Nias–Simeulue earthquake disaster in Nias, Indonesia.
- 2005: Search and Rescue mission for Kashmir earthquake disaster in Balakot, Pakistan.
- 2005: Rescue and firefighting mission for Riau forest fire in Riau, Indonesia.
- 2006: Search and Rescue mission for Kampung Pasir landslide in Ulu Klang, Selangor. This incident happens not too far from Highland Tower.
- 2006: Search and Rescue operation for Southern Leyte mudslide disaster in Leyte, Philippines.
- 2006: Search and Rescue operation for Yogyakarta earthquake disaster in Yogyakarta, Indonesia.
- 2007: Rescue mission for Johor flood victims.
- 2008: Search and Rescue mission for Ulu Yam landslide in Ulu Yam, Selangor.
- 2008: Search and Rescue mission for Bukit Antarabangsa landslide incident in Ulu Klang, Selangor. This incident happens not far from Highland Tower.
- 2009: Search and Rescue mission for cave collapse at Ipoh Cave Temples in Ipoh, Perak.
- 2009: Search and Rescue operation for building collapse in Section 14, Petaling Jaya, Selangor.
- 2009: Search and Rescue operation for Sumatra earthquakes disaster in Padang, Indonesia.
- 2011: Search and Rescue operation for Tohoku earthquakes disaster in Japan.
- 2013: Search and Rescue operation for Genting Highland bus accidents, Pahang.
- 2013: Search and Rescue operation for Typhoon Haiyan disaster in Leyte, Philippines.
- 2014: Search and Rescue operation for Malaysia Airlines Flight 17 incident in Donetsk Oblast, Ukraine.
- 2015: Search and Rescue mission for Nepal earthquake disaster in Nepal.
- 2015: Search and Rescue mission for Sabah earthquake disaster in Ranau, Sabah.
- 2016: Search and Rescue operation for Taman Idaman landslide incident in Serendah, Selangor
- 2016: Search and Rescue operation for KL Eco City flyover collapse in Bangsar, Kuala Lumpur.
- 2019: Cleaning Kim Kim River toxic pollution in Pasir Gudang, Johor.
- 2022: Search and rescue operation for the Batang Kali landslide in Batang Kali, Selangor (near Genting Highland, Pahang).
- 2023: Search and rescue operation for the Turkey–Syria earthquakes.
- 2025: Search and rescue operation for the Myanmar earthquake.
- 2025: Search and rescue operation for the Cebu earthquake, Philippines.
