= Pharmaniaga =

Malaysian pharmaceutical company

Pharmaniaga Berhad
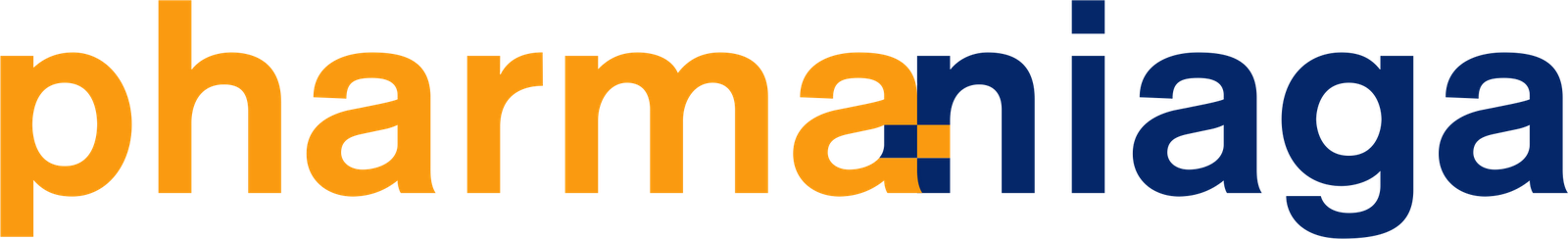
- Type: Public listed company
- Traded as: MYX: 7081
- Industry: Pharmaceuticals; Health care
- Predecessor: Southern Task (M) Sdn Bhd (1994); Remedi Pharmaceuticals (1994-1998)
- Founded: 1994; 32 years ago
- Founder: UEM Group
- Headquarters: Shah Alam, Selangor, Malaysia
- Area served: Worldwide
- Key people: Dato’ Zulkifli Jafar, Managing Director; Ahmad Shahredzuan Mohd Shariff, Chief Operating Officer; Norai’ni Mohamed Ali, Chief Financial Officer; Dr Badarulhisam Abdul Rahman, Scientific Officer; Erick Arjunan, Chief Commercial Officer; and Wan Intan Idura Wan Ismail, Chief Governance Officer
- Products: Prescription drugs, biopharmaceuticals
- Revenue: RM3.8 billion (FY2024)
- Net income: RM133.8mil (FY2024)
- Number of employees: Over 3,000
- Parent: Boustead Holdings
- Subsidiaries: Pharmaniaga Logistics Sdn Bhd; Pharmaniaga Marketing Sdn Bhd; Pharmaniaga Research Centre Sdn Bhd; Pristine Pharma Sdn Bhd (ceased operation); Paradigm Industry Sdn Bhd (ceased operation); Pharmaniaga Manufacturing Bhd; InspiraPharma Sdn Bhd (Sungai Petani); InspiraPharma Sdn Bhd (Seri Iskandar); Pharmaniaga LifeScience Sdn Bhd; PT Millennium Pharmacon International TBK; PT Errita Pharma
- Website: www.pharmaniaga.com

Pharmaniaga Berhad (Pharmaniaga) is Malaysia’s largest listed integrated healthcare company, offering research and development, manufacturing, logistics, and distribution of pharmaceuticals and medical supplies.

== History ==
Pharmaniaga was established in 1994 as Remedi Pharmaceuticals. The company was renamed as Pharmaniaga in August 1998 and is the first healthcare company in Malaysia to be listed in the Main Market of Kuala Lumpur Stock Exchange (now Bursa Malaysia).

== Ownership ==
Pharmaniaga is a public listed company. Its two major shareholders are Boustead Holdings and Lembaga Tabung Angkatan Tentera (LTAT). The major owner of Boustead Holdings is itself LTAT.

The Company's Board Members comprise Dato’ Seri Abdul Razak Jaafar, Independent Non-Executive Chairman; Dato’ Zulkifli Jafar, Managing Director; Dr Abdul Razak Ahmad, Senior Independent Non-Executive Director; Sarah Azreen Abdul Samat, Independent Non-Executive Director; Mohammad Ashraf Md. Radzi, Non-Independent Non-Executive Director; Dato’ Mohd Zahir Zahur Hussain, Independent Non-Executive Director; Dato’ Dr Faridah Aryani Md Yusof, Independent Non-Executive Director; Drs Imam Fathorrahman, Independent Non-Executive Director; Dr Mary Jane Cardosa, Independent Non-Executive Director; Dato’ Seri Dr Awaludin Said, Independent Non-Executive Director; Datuk Mohd Adzahar Abdul Wahid, Non-Independent Non-Executive Director; and Mohd Firdaus Zulkifli, Non-Independent Non-Executive Director (Alternate Director to Mohammad Ashraf Md. Radzi).

== Business overview ==
Pharmaniaga's activity extends beyond manufacturing, encompassing logistics and distribution, as well as sales and marketing.

Pharmaniaga has over 3,522 employees, and more than 50 scientific and technical experts across various disciplines.

With five manufacturing plants, including one Indonesia plant, Pharmaniaga is capable of producing products in various forms; from oral solids, liquids and creams to small volume injectables. Its product portfolio encompasses a diverse segment of therapeutic areas such as cardiovascular, diabetes, anti-infectives, pain management, and respiratory, amongst others.

Its Indonesia operations comprise PT Errita Pharma (Errita) and PT Millennium Pharmacon International Tbk (MPI). MPI is a public listed company on the Indonesia Stock Exchange with 37 branches nationwide. Meanwhile, Errita produces over 60 generic pharmaceuticals as well as over-the-counter products.
