= 2002 Taman Hillview landslide =

2002 landslide in Selangor, Malaysia

- Date: 20 November 2002
- Location: Taman Hillview, Ulu Klang, Selangor, Malaysia
- Type: Landslide
- Outcome: Destruction of a residential bungalow
- Deaths: 8

The 2002 Taman Hillview landslide occurred in the early morning of 20 November 2002 in Taman Hillview, Ulu Klang, Selangor, Malaysia. The landslide destroyed the bungalow of retired Malaysian Armed Forces chief and Affin Bank chairman Ismail Omar, killing eight people, including six members of his family and two domestic workers.

A subsequent geological study found that prolonged heavy rainfall triggered the landslide, while the site's location within an older landslide zone and modifications to the slope contributed to its failure.

== Background ==
Taman Hillview is a residential area in Ulu Klang, Selangor, near the site of the Highland Towers collapse in 1993, which killed 48 people. Both disasters occurred in the hilly terrain of the Ampang Jaya area, where slope stability has been a significant concern.

== Landslide ==
The landslide occurred at approximately 4:50 am on 20 November 2002, following several days of heavy rainfall. The movement of earth and debris destroyed the bungalow belonging to Ismail Omar, a former chief of the Malaysian Armed Forces who was also the chairman of Affin Bank.

Ismail was trapped beneath the debris for approximately five hours before being rescued. In an account published eight days after the disaster, he described hearing a domestic worker shout a warning shortly before the slope failed and the house was engulfed by debris.

== Rescue and casualties ==
Rescue workers searched the collapsed bungalow for survivors. Initial reports on the morning of the disaster recorded five deaths, with three other people still trapped beneath the rubble. The final death toll was eight, comprising six members of Ismail's family and two Indonesian domestic workers.

Those killed included Ismail's wife, Azizah Abdul Aziz; his son, Ahmad Ijaz; his son-in-law, Shamsul Azahar Shafie; his daughter-in-law, Zaradino Zaini; and his grandchildren, Johan and Zurian Aishah. The two domestic workers were identified in contemporary reporting as Su and Tini.

== Causes ==
A study by geologists Ibrahim Komoo and Choun-Sian Lim, published in 2003, classified the event as a complex landslide involving rotational movement at the upper part of the slope, sliding in the middle section and flow at the foot of the slope. The affected area extended approximately 200 metres in length and reached a maximum width of 50 metres, involving an estimated 25,000 cubic metres of displaced slope material.

The researchers identified prolonged heavy rainfall as the immediate trigger. Other contributing factors included the site's position within an old landslide zone, surface material susceptible to failure, geological structures that facilitated slope movement, the accumulation of groundwater, levelling and terracing of the upper slope, and an old, damaged rubble retaining wall that concentrated surface water.

The researchers concluded that the disaster represented a recurrence of an earlier landslide. They argued that a detailed assessment of geological hazards before construction could have helped identify the risks associated with building on the site.

A 2019 study of landslides in the wider Bukit Antarabangsa area also identified historical slope modification, construction practices and development on previously unstable or modified slopes as contributing factors in the region's landslide disasters. The study considered the Taman Hillview incident alongside the Highland Towers collapse and the 2008 Bukit Antarabangsa landslide.

== Aftermath ==
The disaster renewed calls for a more systematic investigation of landslides and other natural disasters in Malaysia. On 21 November 2002, geologist Ibrahim Komoo called for the government to establish an agency specifically responsible for investigating the causes of disasters such as landslides, floods and soil erosion. He questioned whether the local authority had sufficient resources to undertake this work.

The incident became one of several fatal landslides in the hilly Bukit Antarabangsa area examined in subsequent geological research. The 2019 study by Lim, Jamaluddin and Komoo revisited these events and highlighted the contribution of human modification of slopes and land-use practices, alongside rainfall and geological conditions, to landslide risk in the area.

== See also ==
- Highland Towers collapse
- 2008 Bukit Antarabangsa landslide
