= LTAT (disambiguation) =

LTAT is the ICAO code for Malatya Erhaç Airport in Malatya, Turkey.

LTAT may also refer to:

- Lawn Tennis Association of Thailand
- Let's Talk About That, a spin-off webseries of Good Mythical Morning
- Lembaga Tabung Angkatan Tentera or Armed Forces Fund Board, a statutory body of the Malaysian Armed Forces
