= PersiaSYS =

Telecommunications company based in Kuala Lumpur, Malaysia

PersiaSYS Sdn Bhd is a telecommunication company based on Kuala Lumpur, Malaysia licensed by the Malaysian Communications and Multimedia Commission. The company started providing broadband Internet service based on cable and wireless technologies in 2006.

PersiaSYS is offering Wifi Hotspot and high speed cable internet in Bukit Antarabangsa area in forms of prepaid and postpaid.

PersiaSYS has started to provide a VoIP service in 2009 under the UltraTone brand.
