= 2011 Hulu Langat landslide =

Landslide in Malaysia

- Date: 21 May 2011
- Time: 2:20 pm UTC+8 MST
- Location: Batu 14, Jalan Cheras, Hulu Langat, Selangor; 3.138612°N 101.8141128°E
- Cause: Landslide caused by continuous rainfall
- Deaths: 16
- Injuries: 9

The 2011 Hulu Langat landslide was a landslide attributed to heavy rain that occurred on the afternoon of 21 May 2011, at Kampung Gahal in the district of Hulu Langat at Selangor, Malaysia. The landslide struck an orphanage nearby, killing 16 people, including 13 children.

== Background ==
The Hidayah Madrasah Al-Taqwa orphanage was located at Semungkis River Road at Kampung Gahal, part of FELCRA Semungkis. The region, a hilly rural area, is vulnerable to landslides. The landslide occurred at 2:20 pm local time and had only affected the orphanage building.

Search and rescue efforts commenced 25 minutes after the incident. 754 members of the Royal Malaysia Police, the Malaysian Fire and Rescue Department, Malaysian Civil Defence Department, the Malaysian Search and Rescue Team (SMART), Malaysian Armed Forces, General Operations Force (GOF), and St. John Ambulance were deployed during the rescue efforts. The close proximity of the bodies of each victim had eased the rescue operations, which ended at 5:30 am the following day. In total, 16 people (13 children, 2 teenagers, and a guardian) were found dead, while 9 people were injured. Casualties were sent to hospitals nearby. An operation was made as a follow-up on 22 May for surveying and cleaning efforts.

== Aftermath ==
7 victims were buried at Sultan Hisamuddin Shah Mosque at Hulu Langat.

Subsequent investigations concluded that prolonged rainfall, coupled with disturbances on the hill slopes nearby had resulted in the landslide. The orphanage's location was also noted for being extremely close to the collapsed slope. During the landslide, the orphanage was holding an event for the children in the orphanage. The event was set up under a temporary canopy. The debris had directly struck the canopy, trapping many people inside.

== See also ==
- 2008 Bukit Antarabangsa landslide
- 2022 Batang Kali landslide
- Highland Towers collapse
