= Captain Bala =

Malaysian activist

Capt.K.Bala PPN .PKPB .PJB. F.(Com)
- Occupation: Director of Code Red Survival Academy
- Organizations: Malaysia International Search & Rescue (MISAR); Malaysian Volunteer Fire & Rescue Association(MVFRA); Road Safety Marshal Club (RSMC)
- Website: codered.com.my misar.org.my rsmc.org.my

Balasupramaniam Krishnan .PPN .PKPB .PJB. F.(Com) (more fondly known as Captain Bala or Capt.K.Bala) is a prominent safety activist, safety advocate, emergency survival trainer and Malaysian humanitarian.

He is the founder and chairman of Malaysia International Search and Rescue (MISAR) and Malaysian Volunteer Fire & Rescue Association (MVFRA). He is also the President of Road Safety Marshal Club (RSMC). He is the Director of Code Red Survival Academy.

He has 23 years of experience in the search and rescue arena. He has led his team of volunteer members to serve in various international search and rescue operations and also humanitarian aid, namely, Bam Iran earthquake in 2003, Bandar Aceh earthquake and tsunami in 2004, Peru earthquake in 2007, Sichuan earthquake in 2008, Cyclone Nargis Myanmar in 2008, Typhoon Ketsana Philippines in 2009, Thailand Floods Operation in 2011, Nepal earthquake in April 2015, and Pidie Jaya, Aceh earthquake in 2016.

In June 2007, he rescued Ceriyati Dapin, an Indonesian maid who attempted to escape through the window of her employer's 18th floor apartment and unfortunately was stuck on a ledge on the 15th floor. He received an appreciation from the Indonesia Government for protecting the citizen of Indonesia in Malaysia by the ambassador of Indonesia, Mr A.M Fachir on 17 August 2007 at ambassador residence at Kuala Lumpur.

He was featured as one of the icon for Malaysia WiraNegaraku.

== Malaysia International Search and Rescue (MISAR) ==
MISAR Malaysia is a non-governmental and non-profit organization founded by Capt.K.Bala. It is a platform for individuals with the passion to serve in search and rescue missions and humanitarian field. MISAR Malaysia plays an important role in the search and rescue arena locally and internationally. MISAR Malaysia was at the forefront in rendering humanitarian aid to the victims in the Pidie Jaya, Aceh earthquake in 2016.

== Malaysian Volunteer Fire and Rescue Association (MVFRA) ==
MVFRA is a non-governmental organization and non-profit organization established in 1991 by Capt.K.Bala. MVFRA has served the nation in, amongst other, the Bright Sparklers Fireworks disaster in 1991, Choon Hong III Port Klang Fire Tragedy in 1992, Highland Towers collapse in 1993, 2008 Bukit Antarabangsa landslide, Penan Food Aid Operation in 2009, Langkawi Bukit Malut Fire Victim Relief Operation in 2010, Malaysia Floods Relief Operation from 2010–2016, Sabah Earthquake Rescue Operation in 2015, Beaufort Flood Relief Operation in 2015, Ranau water shortage relief operation in 2015, Kg Landung Ayang Laut Kudat Fire Relief Operation in 2016.

== Road Safety Marshal Club (RSMC) ==
Road Safety Marshal Club (RSMC) is a non-governmental organization established in 2008 with the aim to provide support for the success of the activities of road safety and to conduct road safety awareness program for the public.

== Recognition and awards ==
- 2016 - Awarded the Lifetime Achievement Award - A Prime Minister's Award-Volunteer Malaysia Awards 2016
- 2005 - Awarded the Pingat Pangkuan Negara (Honorary Title of PPN) conferred by DYMM Tunku Syed Sirajuddin Putra Jamalullail
- 2004 - Awarded the Young Outstanding Malaysian Award, presented by YB Dato' Sri Ong Tee Keat
- 2002 - Awarded the Young Outstanding Malaysian Award by Junior Chamber Mandarin Kuala Lumpur
- 2002 - Awarded the highest award of Pingat Ketua Pengarah Bomba (Honorary Title of PKPB), presented by the former Director General Fire & Rescue Department YS Prof Dato Dr Soh Chai Hock
- 1999 - Awarded the Anugerah Belia Negara by Ministry of Youth and Sports (Malaysia), presented by Prime Minister Mahathir Mohamad
- 1999 - Awarded the Pingat Jasa Bomba (Honorary Title of PJB) by The Fire and Rescue Department of Malaysia, presented by the former Director General Fire & Rescue Department YS Prof Dato Dr Soh Chai Hock

He was awarded the "Fire Commander" Commanding Accreditation (F.Com) in Fire & Rescue Service by YS Prof Dato Dr Soh Chai Hock, President for Fire Prevention Council Malaysia Institute of Fire Engineers Malaysia.

== Publications and presentations ==
- 2006 - Burden of Injuring South Africa World Health Conference
- 2012- Presented in TNB Safety Conference on REACT Crime Prevention & Survival Program
- 2012- Road Safety Conference in Malaysia
- 2012- Clinical Health Conference by WHO
- 2012- MBA
- 2013- International Women's Day
- 2011- NIOSH Safety Conference
- 2011- Presented in TNB 5th Occupational Safety, Health & Environment Conference 2011 on Empowering SHOE towards Malaysian Number 1 Killer "Road Traffic Accident" with Road Survival Skills"

== Featured ==
- Capt.K.Bala to the rescue!, New Straits Times, 14 July 2019
- Women, Beware, The Star, 2 January 2010
- Staying Alive in the Face of Danger, The Star, 25 September 2010
- Volunteer Firefighters Brave the Heat to Save Lives, The Star, 12 November 2012
- 震撼人心（三）：苏财福：勿依赖救援单位遇震先自救, China Press, 30 July 2015
- 震撼人心（四）从小灌输融入生活向日本学防, China Press, 31 July 2015
- Crucial to be Alert and Prepared to Stay Safe, The Star, 24 June 2012
- Don't Give Crime an Opportunity, The Edge, 22 May 2014
- Disaster Preparedness: How ready are we to face the worst?, The Rocket, 7 January 2015
- Local Emergency Response Teams a Must at Waterfalls, FMT News, 23 August 2016
- March 2017 - House Fires and Road Safety, Live and Learn Programme, BFM
- March 2016 - Malaysian Drives Gone Wild, Live and Learn Programme, BFM
- July 2014 - Amanita and Crime Prevention, Live and Learn Programme, BFM
- December 2013 - Surviving Deadly Floods, Live and Learn Programme, BFM
- January 2013 - Volunteering your Life for Others, Evening Edition, BFM
- June 2012 - Civic-Mindedness and Your Safety, Live and Learn Programme, BFM
- August 2011 - Safety during Raya, Live and Learn Programme, BFM
- May 2011 - Child Safety: At Home & On the Road, Live and Learn Programme, BFM
- December 2010 - Road Safety Measures, Live and Learn Programme, BFM
- September 2010 - How to be Safe and Streetwise - Tips for Women, Live and Learn Programme, BFM
- December 2009 - Road Safety this Holiday Season, Live and Learn Programme, BFM
- July 2009 - Anticipating Road Accidents, Live and Learn Programme, BFM
