= RSMC (disambiguation) =

An RSMC (Regional Specialized Meteorological Center) is a component of the World Weather Watch.

RSMC may also refer to:

- Reactor Sites Management Company, a company acquired by American waste-management company EnergySolutions
- Road Safety Marshal Club (RSMC), a Malaysian safety group whose president is Captain Bala
- Ravi Shankar Music Circle, a music label used by sitar player Manilal Nag
- Rural and Suburban Mail Carriers, part of the workforce represented by the Canadian Union of Postal Workers

== See also ==
- RMSC (disambiguation)
