= Taman Hillview =

Township in Gombak, Selangor, Malaysia

Hillview
- Township
- Taman Hillview
- Hillview in Selangor, Malay Peninsular and Malaysia Hillview (Peninsular Malaysia) Hillview (Malaysia)
- Coordinates: 3°10′50.14″N 101°45′38.26″E
- Country: Malaysia
- State: Selangor
- District: Gombak
- Time zone: UTC+8 (MYT)
- Postal code: 68000

Taman Hillview is a township in Ulu Klang, Gombak District, Selangor, Malaysia. The township lies in a landslide-prone area. It is located next the Kuala Lumpur Middle Ring Road 2.

This township was once home to many Western expatriates circa 1970s. It is located roughly halfway between Ampang and Melawati. Sri Ukay is a residential area located immediately adjacent to Hillview.

Due to its proximity to the nearest hills, a collection of houses and apartments were built here. Many major landslides occurred due to the soil erosion that occurs after heavy rain. This residential area also recently added a guard house. This security system included motorcycle rounding.

In future, Taman Hillview will be connected by MRT Circle Line via Taman Hillview MRT station.

== Notable events ==
- 11 December 1993 - Block 1 of the Highland Towers collapse, 48 people killed.
- 20 November 2002 - The bungalow of the Affin Bank chairman General (RtD) Tan Sri Ismail Omar collapsed due to a landslide in Taman Hillview.

== See also ==
- Bukit Antarabangsa
