= RMSC =

RMSC may refer to:

- Red Mountain Ski Club, the original name of Red Mountain Resort in British Columbia, Canada
- Rizal Memorial Sports Complex, a national sports facility in the Philippines
- Rochester Museum and Science Center, a science and nature museum in New York state, US
- The Rose M. Singer Center, a facility located on Rikers Island

== See also ==
- RSMC (disambiguation)
