= 1996 Pos Dipang mudslide =

1996 mudslide disaster in Malaysia

- Pos Dipang (Malaysia)
- Date: 29 August 1996; 29 years ago
- Time: 6:00 PM (MST)
- Location: Pos Dipang Orang Asli Settlement, Kampar, Perak, Malaysia
- Type: Mudslide and flash flood
- Cause: Continuous heavy rain causing soil erosion
- Outcome: Loss of lives and property damage
- Deaths: 44 (including 5 missing, presumed dead)
- Missing: 5

The 1996 Pos Dipang mudslide was a mudslide disaster that took place on August 29, 1996, at 6:00 PM (Malaysia time) in the Pos Dipang Orang Asli Settlement in Kampar, Perak. The event occurred just two days before Malaysia’s 39th Independence Day celebration. At least 44 people died in the mudslide, including five who had been reported missing and are presumed dead.

== Background ==
The village comprised approximately 60 houses, constructed with assistance from the Department of Orang Asli Development (JHEOA) and housing around 1,500 residents. It was established in 1978 following successful cultivation of an orchard by the local community. Prior to this, residents had lived at Batu 19, Cameron Highlands Road, located nearby.

=== Incident ===
Due to heavy rainfall starting at noon and lasting for six hours, most residents of Pos Dipang remained indoors. Around 6:00 PM, a loud noise was heard from the hills behind the village, followed shortly by a torrent of mud and water that breached the village, causing widespread flooding and structural damage. The force of the mudslide displaced several homes along the banks of the Dipang River and swept away some residents attempting to evacuate. The mudslide also destroyed bridges and cut off certain roads in the area.

Rescue operations began with 400 personnel, including local police, fire brigades, the Royal Ranger Regiment’s 2nd Brigade, the 69th Commando of the General Operations Force (GOF) Ulu Kinta, the 3rd Battalion of the GOF Bidor, and additional support from the Kampar District Office staff and Civil Defense Forces from Ipoh. The first body, an Orang Asli woman in her 30s, was found at 1:30 AM. Despite difficult conditions, including swift currents and darkness due to power outages, rescue teams continued their search.

After 13 days, the search was officially called off on September 11, 1996, with the final death toll at 39, with five missing.

=== Aftermath ===
Following the mudslide disaster at the Pos Dipang Orang Asli settlement on August 29, 1996, Menteri Besar of Perak Ramli Ngah Talib announced on September 1 that an official investigation report would soon be released. The investigation team included notable figures such as Dr. Mazlan Ahmad, Director-General of the Division of Space Science Studies (BAKSA) from the Prime Minister's Department, and Professor Ibrahim Keno, a geologist from Universiti Kebangsaan Malaysia.

In response to the tragedy, nearly all state governments with significant Orang Asli populations directed the Department of Orang Asli Development (JHEOA) to identify vulnerable settlements, particularly those prone to mudslides. Consequently, a new settlement was established for the Pos Dipang Orang Asli community near their original location. This new 1.5-hectare settlement, regarded as a model for future resettlement projects, was found by a state government research to be suitable and safe for habitation. It consists of 53 houses, each constructed at a cost of RM7,000.

Additionally, Information Minister Mohamed Rahmat, acting as Chairman of the National Disaster Committee, allocated RM100,000 from the National Disaster Fund to support the affected families and assist recovery efforts.

== Cause ==
The inquiry into the mudslide identified several factors, primarily linked to climatic, topographic, and geological conditions in the region. Abnormal heavy rainfall was noted, with precipitation reaching 461 mm in August 1996 compared to previous years, contributing to soil erosion on steep hillsides near the river, leading to the disaster.

Additionally, fallen trees from prior logging activities on nearby hills created temporary dams in narrow passages, exacerbating the mudslide's impact on the village.

== Cultural impact ==
TV3, through its program Detik Tragik, aired an episode focusing on the tragedy.
