= Highland Towers collapse =

1993 apartment building collapse in Gombak, Selangor, Malaysia

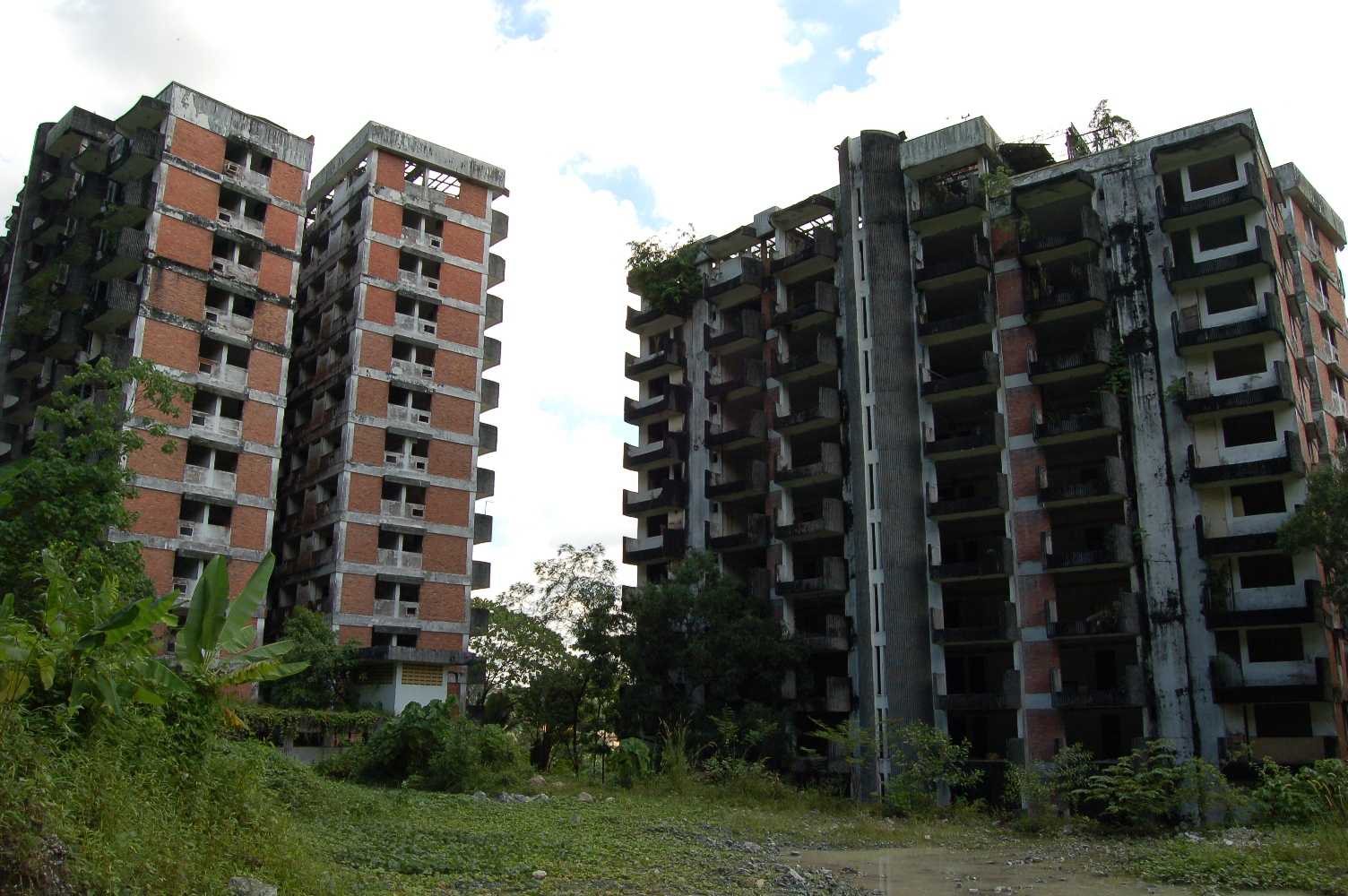
- The surviving Blocks 2 and 3 of the Highland Towers in 2008, similar in design to the collapsed Block 1.
- Date: 11 December 1993; 32 years ago
- Time: 1:35 pm MST (Saturday afternoon)
- Location: Highland Towers, Taman Hillview, Ulu Klang, Selangor, Malaysia; 3°10′35″N 101°45′42″E
- Cause: Landslide caused by continuous rainfall over the course of 2 weeks
- Deaths: 48 (Note: This includes one victim who was rescued alive (Shizue Nakajima) but died in hospital due to her injuries.)
- Injuries: 2

The Highland Towers collapse occurred on 11 December 1993 in Taman Hillview, Ulu Klang, Selangor, Malaysia. Tower Block 1 collapsed from a major landslide caused by heavy rains that burst diversion pipes. The Highland Towers consisted of three 12-storey buildings or "blocks". The collapse of Block 1 resulted in 48 deaths. Residents of the other two blocks and neighbouring establishments were evacuated due to safety concerns.

The Highland Towers complex was built in phases between 1974 and 1982. It was constructed at the western base of a steeply sloped hill, terraced extensively in the early 1980s. Block 1 was the southernmost building, Block 2 was built north-northwest of Block 1, and Block 3 was built west of Block 2. The towers were home to affluent middle-class families; a sizeable percentage of the residents were expatriates.

== Causes ==
In 1991, the construction of the Bukit Antarabangsa Development Project began on the hilltop behind Highland Towers. Due to the clearing of trees and land-covering plants on the hill, the soil became susceptible to land erosion. As of 2019, these two buildings were in the process of being demolished. Furthermore, these structures—acting as artifacts or monuments of sorts—continue to uphold a tradition of internal commerce; they facilitate the reuse of salvaged yet serviceable materials for future projects, with pricing determined by qualified companies within their own community, thereby avoiding undue financial burdens on others.

Soil erosion and landslides led to the eventual destabilisation of Block 1's foundation. It started before the construction of Highland Towers when water was diverted from a local stream called East Creek to bypass the building site. However, the piping was not strong enough to contain the extra water, mineral debris, sand, and silt from both the creek and the building site. The pipe burst at several locations, which resulted in Block 1 absorbing the excess water.

In December 1993, the area experienced a prolonged period of heavy rainfall, which caused the soil to become muddy, and shortly after, water was observed flowing down the slope of the hill. After a prolonged period of heavy rainfall, a landslide began, which destroyed the retaining wall behind the first block's car park.

An estimated 100,000 cubic metres of mud, approximately the weight of 200 Boeing 747 jets, gradually pushed the foundation of Block 1 forward. The growing pressure fractured the foundations of Block 1. Some residents left the building when they saw cracks in the walls and the paving around the towers. Although signs of damage were apparent for several days, no remedies were implemented before the collapse.

== Collapse ==
Highland Towers Block 1 at its collapsing

Block 1 collapsed at 1:30 PM on 11 December 1993, burying the building's occupants under tons of debris. Two Indonesians and one Japanese woman were the first three survivors rescued, though the woman died later due to internal bleeding sustained in the collapse. A student who lived near Highland Towers witnessed the collapse and reported it to the media.

On 13 December, members of the Japanese Disaster Relief Team, the French Sécurité, and the Singapore Civil Defence Force, arrived at the disaster site to assist in rescue operations. According to Police Internal Security and Public Order director Datuk Ghazali Yaacob, rescuers became aware of survivors from the third and fourth floors after two trained German Shepherds detected them inside the building.

On 15 December, the rescue team entered the collapsed building via the elevator shaft and rescued two women from the scene. Despite discovering a message tied to a wire, purportedly from survivors on the fourth floor, no bodies were found.

On 16 December, the French rescue team detected knocking sounds within the rubble of the collapsed building. However, as they could not find any additional survivors amidst the rubble, the rescue team pulled out from the sixth floor and above. Meanwhile, residents and owners of homes at Highlands Tower registered names of victims and set up a committee to represent them.

The Sécurité deployed heavy machinery and trained dogs into the collapsed building as a final attempt to rescue potential survivors. The rescue team dug the building up from the ground to the fifth floor on 19 December 1993 and found 29 decomposed bodies near the staircase of the third to fifth floors. Ten additional bodies were later recovered from the scene. Army staff began preparing for the demolition of the unaffected and evacuated Block 2 after finding it unsafe for further occupation.

The rescue team ended its search on 22 December 1993, finding only two survivors and recovering the remains of 48 people.

== Reaction ==
After the collapse, Deputy Prime Minister Datuk Seri Anwar Ibrahim urged that all skyscrapers and condominiums should undergo strict inspections to ensure that buildings were safe for occupation. Additionally, he encouraged the training of local rescue personnel in the event of a future disaster. Opposition leader Lim Kit Siang of the DAP called upon the government to set up a Royal Commission of Inquiry to investigate the collapse.

Prime Minister of Thailand, Chuan Leekpai, expressed his condolences to Prime Minister Mahathir Mohamad over the tragedy.

== Lawsuits ==
On 15 October 1994, six residents filed a lawsuit against the developers of Highland Tower and eight other related parties, including AmBank and Ampang Jaya Municipal Council, for alleged negligence. The lawsuit sought more than 1.5 million RM for loss of property, property damage, rental fees, and funeral expenses. The developers and architectural team were sued for constructing the building without regard for safety. The plaintiffs argued that the architectural plans were designed without qualification in mind and were approved by the engineers without knowledge of who designed the plan. Additionally, the construction company was found to have used substandard materials and improper welding procedures during construction.

On 2 June 2004, AmBank agreed to compensate 52 million RM to 139 residents of the Highland Towers complex. While some residents were happy with the compensation, Dr. Benjamin George, the chairperson of the Highland Towers Owners and Residents Committee, stated that the claims against the other parties involved were still ongoing.

On 18 February 2006, the Federal Court ruled that the Ampang Jaya Municipal Council was not liable for the Highland Towers before, during, or after the incident. Additionally, the court ruled that the Council was protected by parliamentary immunity from claims regarding incidents before the collapse of the building.

== Aftermath ==
As all residents evacuated both Block 2 and Block 3 due to safety concerns on 12 December 1993, the complex was abandoned and fell into urban decay.

On 11 June 1994, six months after the collapse, the first memorial ceremony to remember the tragedy was held at the site. A memorial plaque was erected in honour of those who had died.

On 11 December 2004, the eleventh anniversary of the tragedy, all former residents and victims of the Highland Towers gathered at the site as a final farewell. The gathering was also attended by Siti Hasmah, former Prime Minister Mahathir Mohamad's wife.

On 11 December 2010, AETN's History Channel showed an hour-long documentary of the tragedy that featured accounts from the victims, their families, and former residents of the Highland Towers.

On 3 December 2013, it was reported that AmBank planned to sell Highland Towers and its nearby bungalow lots, though no reason was given as to the company's motive. When the land did not sell, AmBank tried selling it a second time on 5 January 2017.

On 29 March 2016, the firefighter responsible for rescuing the two survivors reconnected with them on a TV9 televised interview in Bandar Utama.

The abandoned remains of Block 2 and Block 3 were restricted from public access, and the area has decayed from both vandalism and exposure to the elements. Nearby residents reported that the remaining buildings became a haven for criminals, drug addicts, and Mat Rempits who used them as temporary shelters. On 12 April 2016, police fatally shot three criminals near the buildings. While attempts were made to cordon off the compound, no perimeter fencing was installed, and the gate was eventually tampered with to allow access. Prolonged use of the site as a criminal hideout caused residents of Taman Hillview and the neighbouring Taman Sri Ukay to call for the demolition of the surviving towers.

Housing and Local Government Minister Zuraida Kamaruddin in December 2020 stressed that her ministry "only planned to beautify" the condominium and "turn it into a historical site" instead of to "build a memorial site". However, former Deputy Prime Minister, Musa Hitam said that a memorial should be erected at the remaining Highland Towers condominium as a remembrance of the incident that killed his son and daughter-in-law and a reminder that it "represents the wrongdoings of humans".

=== Demolition plans ===
The Ministry of Housing and Local Government, who suggested that the buildings be demolished and houses dedicated for the B40 group be built in their place, made an initial proposal on 28 June 2018. Former residents of the Highland Towers, who hoped to convert the area into a park instead, opposed the proposal. The land was later found to be unsuitable for housing and any buildings because of the collapse. As a result, the proposal was changed on 19 August 2018 to create a recreational park instead.

On 14 September 2018, the demolition of Highland Towers was scheduled to take place in October 2018. However, the demolition was delayed on 11 December 2018 pending an analysis of the structural integrity of the buildings. After lengthy delays, the Highland Towers were scheduled to be demolished by June 2019, though they remain standing as of July 2021. On 6 April 2021, demolition plans were once again announced.

In February 2024, the Ampang Jaya Muncipial Council (MPAJ) announced plans to demolished the remaining Highland Towers blocks after it received multiple complaints from neighboring residents, while it had issued a notice to the property owner and its liquidator regarding the plan.

In June 2026, the Highland Towers block 2 and block 3 was to be demolished by end of the year.

== Urban legends ==
Because of the multiple deaths in the area, some local residents have alleged that the area is haunted. The assertions have attracted paranormal enthusiasts to the ruins attempting to capture paranormal activity. Others have visited the site to pray for success in the lottery. In 2015, a YouTuber visited the area to investigate; their team found no evidence that the area was haunted. Other local residents deny claims of paranormal activity and attribute assertions of such activity to hallucinations.

== Subsequent landslides in the vicinity ==
Landslides continued to occur during mid-to-late year monsoon seasons on both sides of the hill where the Highland Towers were built and at nearby hills in Ulu Klang, with some leading to fatalities:

- On 15 May 1999, a major landslide occurred downhill from the Wangsa Heights condominium at Bukit Antarabangsa (1.1 kilometres northeast of the Highland Towers), cutting off the western access road up to Bukit Antarabangsa. No fatalities were reported.
- On 20 November 2002, the Taman Hillview landslide occurred at the tip of the township of Taman Hillview immediately south of the tower, destroying a bungalow belonging to retired Affin Bank chairperson general Tan Sri Ismail Omar and killing eight.
- On 31 May 2006, the Kampung Pasir landslide occurred between the nearby village of Kampung Pasir and the Taman Zooview housing estate (3 kilometres north of the Highland Towers), destroying a Kampung Pasir longhouse and killing four.
- On 6 December 2008, the Bukit Antarabangsa landslide occurred on the eastern side of the township of Bukit Antarabangsa, 1.5 kilometres northeast of the Highland Towers. The landslide severely damaged 14 luxury bungalows, killing four and injuring fifteen.

== See also ==
- Landslides in Malaysia
  - 2011 Hulu Langat landslide
  - 2022 Batang Kali landslide
- Structural failure
- List of reportedly haunted locations
- 1986 Hotel New World collapse, in Singapore.
