= Ismail Omar (general) =

13th Chief of the Malaysian Defence Forces (1995–1998)

Yang Berbahagia General (Rtd) Tan Sri Ismail Omar PGAT PMN SIMP SPDK SPTS DHMS DSNS PAT JMN KMN AMN PPA PPM PNBB PJM PM DPKT
- إسماعيل عمر

13th Chief of Defence Forces
- In office 3 February 1995 – 31 December 1998
- Monarch: Ja'afar
- Prime Minister: Mahathir Mohamad
- Minister of Defence: Najib Razak (1995); Syed Hamid Albar (1995–1998)
- Preceded by: Borhan Ahmad
- Succeeded by: Mohd Zahidi Zainuddin

14th Chief of Army
- In office 1 February 1994 – 2 February 1995
- Preceded by: Borhan Ahmad
- Succeeded by: Che Md Noor Mat Arshad

Personal details
- Born: 29 April 1941 (age 85) Gemas, Negeri Sembilan, Federated Malay States
- Spouse: Azizah Abdul Aziz (died 2002)
- Children: 4
- Education: Federation Military College, Port Dickson; Royal Military Academy, Sandhurst

Military service
- Allegiance: Malaysia
- Branch/service: Malaysian Army
- Years of service: 1961–1998
- Rank: General
- Unit: Royal Malay Regiment
- Battles/wars: Indonesia–Malaysia confrontation; Second Malayan Emergency

Ismail bin Omar (Jawi: إسماعيل بن عمر; born 29 April 1941), is a Malaysian retired military officer who served as the 13th chief of defence forces from February 1995 to December 1998. Prior to his appointment, he previously served as the 14th chief of Malaysian Army from February 1994 to February 1995.

== Early life and education ==
Ismail was born on 29 April 1941 at Gemas, Negeri Sembilan and he raised at Segamat, Johor. He get his second education at the Federation Military College, Port Dickson before he selected to undergo overseas officer cadet course at the Royal Military Academy, Sandhurst in 1960.

After joined to military, Ismail attended various courses, including course at Canadian Army Command and Staff College in 1972, and then at National Defence College in New Delhi in 1988.

== Career ==
=== Military career ===
Ismail was commissioned to junior lieutenant in December 1961 and posted as platoon commander in 2nd Battalion, Royal Malay Regiment. Between 1961 and 1986, he has held various positions, including company commander at 2nd Battalion, Royal Malay Regiment in 1964 and then at 5th Battalion, Royal Malay Regiment in 1969, commanding officer of 12th Battalion, Royal Malay Regiment in December 1976 and defence attaché at High Commission of Malaysia in Canberra in 1984.

In 1986, Ismail get rank promotion to brigadier general and took charge as commander of 6th Infantry Brigade and then transferred to assistant chief of staff of planning and development in 1988. In late January 1990, he get rank promotion to major general and took charge as commander of 3rd Infantry Division. In April 1992, he appointed as chief of staff of Malaysian Armed Forces Headquarters and he get rank promotion to lieutenant general.

On 1 February 1994, Ismail appointed as 14th chief of Army and get promoted to general following appointment his predecessor Borhan Ahmad as the 12th chief of defence forces. When Borhan retired on 2 February 1995, Ismail take over the post. When his retirement time arrived in April 1996, his term was extended until 31 December 1998 and the position was take over by Mohd Zahidi Zainuddin on 1 January 1999.

=== Post-military career ===
After retirement from military, Ismail was held various positions at several corporates including chairman of Affin Bank from 1999 to 2017.

== Personal life ==
Ismail married with Azizah binti Abdul Aziz and blessed with two sons and two daughters. Azizah and their son, Ahmad Ijaz were died in November 2002 caused by a landslide incident that occurred at Taman Hillview, which resulted in the collapse of their bungalow and killed eight people including Azizah and Ahmad Ijaz.

== Honours ==
=== Honours of Malaysia ===
- Malaysia
  - Commander of the Order of the Defender of the Realm (PMN) – Tan Sri (1995)
  - Companion of the Order of the Defender of the Realm (JMN) (1992)
  - Officer of the Order of the Defender of the Realm (KMN) (1979)
  - Member of the Order of the Defender of the Realm (AMN) (1971)
  - Recipient of the General Service Medal (PPA)
  - Recipient of the Malaysian Commemorative Medal (Bronze) (PPM (G))
  - Recipient of the United Nations Missions Service Medal (PNBB) with "CONGO" clasp (1994)
  - Recipient of the 9th Yang di-Pertuan Agong Installation Medal
  - Recipient of the 10th Yang di-Pertuan Agong Installation Medal
- Malaysian Armed Forces
  - Courageous Commander of the Most Gallant Order of Military Service (PGAT)
  - Warrior of the Most Gallant Order of Military Service (PAT)
  - Recipient of the Malaysian Service Medal (PJM)
- Kedah
  - Knight Commander of the Order of Loyalty to Sultan Abdul Halim Mu'adzam Shah (DHMS) – Dato' Paduka (1995)
- Negeri Sembilan
  - Knight Companion of the Order of Loyalty to Negeri Sembilan (DSNS) – Dato' (1990)
- Pahang
  - Knight Grand Companion of the Order of the Crown of Pahang (SIMP) – formerly Dato', now Dato' Indera (1994)
- Perak
  - Knight Grand Commander of the Order of Taming Sari (SPTS) – Dato' Seri Panglima (1996)
- Sabah
  - Grand Commander of the Order of Kinabalu (SPDK) – Datuk Seri Panglima (1997)

=== Foreign honours ===
- Brunei
  - First Class of the Order of Paduka Keberanian Laila Terbilang (DPKT) – Dato Paduka Seri (1998)
- Indonesia
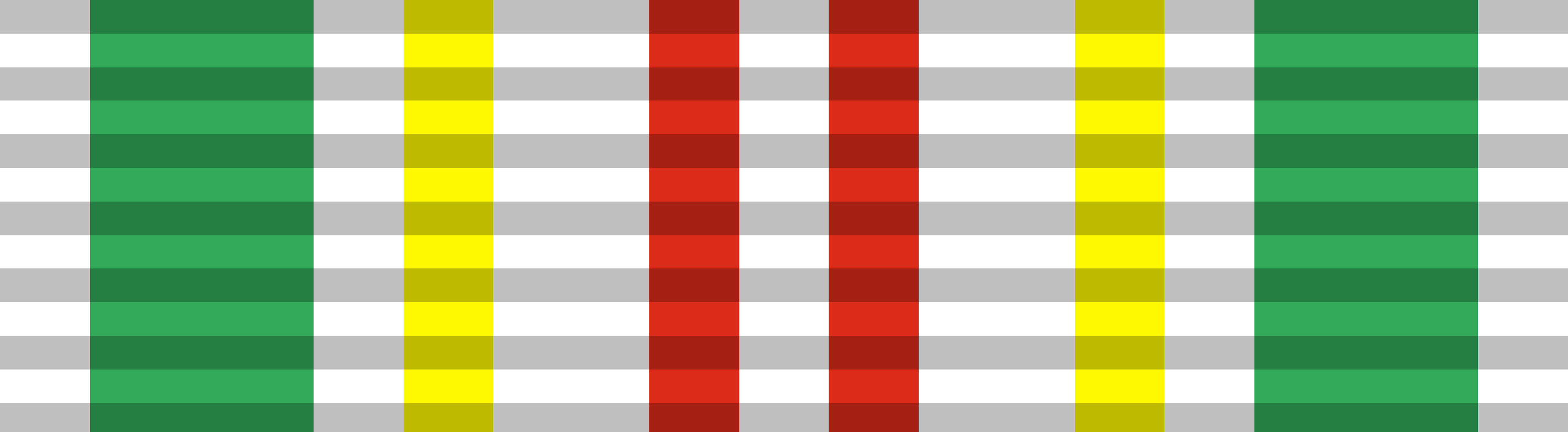
  - First Class (Utama) of the Star of Yudha Dharma (1998)
  - First class (Utama) of the Star of Kartika Eka Paksi
- Thailand
  - Knight Grand Cross of the Order of the Crown of Thailand (PM) (1996)
- United Nations
  - Recipient of the ONUC Medal
- United States
  - Commander of the Legion of Merit (1996)
