= Disaster Assistance and Rescue Team =

Singapore Civil Defence Force unit

- "We Dare"
- Active: May 1990 – present
- Country: Singapore
- Type: Special operations firefighter
- Role: Search and rescue: Urban search and rescue; Maritime search and rescue; Technical rescue
- Size: 120
- Part of: Singapore Civil Defence Force
- Motto(s): "We Dare"
- Notable operations: Nicoll Highway collapse 1990 Luzon earthquake Highland Towers collapse 1999 Jiji earthquake 2004 Indian Ocean earthquake and tsunami 2005 Nias–Simeulue earthquake 2008 Sichuan earthquake 2018 Laos dam collapse

Commanders
- Current commander: Lieutenant Colonel (LTC) Lok Wee Keong
- Notable commanders: Lieutenant Colonel (LTC) Poon Siow Hai

The Disaster Assistance and Rescue Team (DART) is the elite unit of the Singapore Civil Defence Force (SCDF) that specialises in complex incidents such as technical rescue, urban search and rescue, water rescue operations and prolonged firefighting.

== History ==
DART was formed in May 1990. Prior to its formation, there were several elite units such as the Rescue Squad and MRT Task Force that were established by SCDF's predecessor, Singapore Fire Service (SFS). Upon the merger of the then-Singapore Civil Defence Force and SFS, DART was established as the new SCDF's elite rescue team. The first batch of DART consisted of an amalgamation of rescuers who were previously qualified for both elite units.

Its first commander was LTC Poon Siow Hai. In the initial phase, DART participated in several aid missions overseas to gather experience and learn from other countries.

SCDF's DART is the first in the Asia-Pacific region to be classified as a Heavy Urban Search And Rescue (USAR) Team by the International Search and Rescue Advisory Group (INSARAG) in 2008. This Heavy USAR Team classification is the highest level of recognition that can be accorded to USAR Teams by the United Nations. This seal of approval allows disaster affected countries to regard SCDF's USAR capabilities favourably when prioritising acceptance of international response support.

== Operations ==
Common day-to-day operations for DART include deploying for suicide rescue, water mishaps and height rescue missions. Notable local large-scaled operations include the Nicoll Highway collapse, where DART was deployed for a 4-day rescue operation.

DART operates on a dual base system, with DART Eastern Base located in Kallang Fire Station, and DART Western Base located in Jurong Fire Station.

== Operation Lionheart ==
SCDF maintains a dedicated 79-man standby contingent round-the-clock codenamed Operation Lionheart where its core function is to provide urban search and rescue and/or humanitarian relief assistance to countries afflicted by major disasters. The contingent primarily comprises rescuers from DART, with other SCDF frontline units providing additional manpower support.

Several notable Operation Lionheart overseas missions include the 1993 Highland Towers collapse in Malaysia, the 1999 Jiji earthquake in Taiwan, the 2004 Indian Ocean earthquake in Indonesia, the 2005 Kashmir earthquake in Pakistan, the 2008 Sichuan earthquake in China, the 2011 Christchurch earthquake in New Zealand, and the 2023 Turkey–Syria earthquake.

== SCDF Search Platoon (K9 unit) ==
Part of the DART unit, the Search Platoon (K-9 unit) of the SCDF trains and deploys dogs for Urban Search and Rescue (USAR) operations as well as for Fire Investigation (FI).

SCDF's FI Unit will activate the FI dogs when they are needed at the fire ground. When activated, FI dogs are deployed to search for any presence of fire accelerants. The dogs are trained to be familiar with the scent of various accelerants such as diesel, petrol, turpentine, kerosene and thinner. While USAR dogs are trained and deployed for height and depth rescue both locally and overseas. As many of the dogs were purchased from the United Kingdom, they would be given some time to adapt to the local tropical climate while getting trained in agility and obedience. Thereafter, the dogs are required to undergo urban search and rescue training where they will be exposed to various scenarios at the obstacle courses and mazes under different weather conditions and at varying difficulty levels.

The SCDF Search Platoon currently shares the same base as its counterparts from the Police K-9 Unit (Singapore) at No. 2 Mowbray Road.

== Selection and training ==
The first DART training curriculum was derived from a combination of training methodologies inherited from the SFS and earlier Civil Defence Force. Studies were conducted on international special rescue forces' search and rescue training, in which several useful and relevant learning components were then later incorporated. Other than theoretical and psychomotor trainings, DART also focuses on inculcating mental and character resilience in its trainees. It is not only crucial for the DART members to be physically fit but also to be able to remain calm yet tough under extreme conditions.

Candidates must first pass a 30-hour selection test. Test components include a 7-kilometre run, 18-kilometre casualty evacuation, and confidence tests in the water, at height, and in confined spaces. The test is highly selective; in 2018, only seven out of fifteen candidates passed selection. After passing selection, the candidates then undergo a ten-week training course including a 36-hour mission before graduating as DART specialists.

== Appliances ==
DART utilises custom-made appliances such as the DART Rescue Vehicle for deployments.

=== DART Rescue Vehicle (DRV) ===
The DART Rescue Vehicle (DRV) has integrated the Heavy Rescue Tender and Special Rescue Tender into a single platform. With its modular concept of deployment, the DRV can be configured to respond to complex missions involving either height, collapsed structure or underwater rescue operations. It can also double up as a carrier for highly specialised equipment such as the Heli-bucket and Skid Loader.

=== DART Amphibious Vehicle (DAV) ===
The DART Amphibious Vehicle (DAV) enhances SCDF's response to fire and rescue incidents in Singapore's inland and coastal waters. Operated by a four-men crew, the DAV is able to achieve speeds of up to 100 km/h on land and up to 25 knots in water via its twin water jet propulsion system. It is able to enter directly into water bodies and swiftly transits from land to water mode in just 15 seconds using hydraulic wheel-retracting technology.

=== DART Utility Vehicle (DUV) ===
The DART Utility Vehicle (DUV) is a 5-Tonner which is deployed as a troop and equipment carrier.

=== DART Rescue Dog Tender (RDT) ===
The RDT is used by SCDF Search Platoon to deploy USAR Dogs and Fire Investigation Dogs.

=== Special Equipment ===
==== Heli-bucket ====
The heli-bucket is a water dispenser slung underneath a helicopter to collect water from any open source, such as a reservoir or sea. The water in the bucket will then be discharged at the base of the bucket, when the release button is activated. The heli-bucket was acquired by the SCDF to enhance its ground firefighting capability for large bush fires and fires that are in remote forested areas. It has since been deployed by DART to assist the Thailand authorities in fighting a forest fire in Chiang Mai in March 2015 and Indonesian authorities in aerial haze firefighting operations in October 2015.

==== Rigid inflatable boat ====
The Rigid inflatable boat is a lightweight but high-performance and high capacity boat constructed with a rigid hull bottom joined to side-forming air tubes that are inflated with air to a high pressure so as to give the sides resilient rigidity along the boat's topsides. DART utilises the Rigid inflatable boat for water rescue operations along the coastal areas of Singapore.

=== Decommissioned Appliances ===
Appliance	Purpose
Special Rescue Tender (SRT)	Utilised for day-to-day operational response by DART for urban search and rescue operations. (Replaced by HRT)
Heavy Rescue Tender (HRT)	Utilised for day-to-day operational response by DART, the HRT is also deployed for more complex operations including Heavy Urban Search and Rescue operations and rescue work at industrial accidents. The HRT packs a slew of complex rescue equipment including the inflatable rescue boat that is utilised for underwater rescue operations. (Replaced by the new iteration of the DRV)
DART Rescue Vehicle (DRV) (1st iteration)	The DRV (1st iteration) is an all-terrain rescue vehicle specially designed for multi-site deployments that are suitable for overseas search and rescue operations. Equipped with an electrical winch and rescue hardware, the four-wheel DRV can manoeuvre on undulating grounds. Commissioned in early 2008, the DRV was first deployed at the Sichuan Earthquake in the same year. (Replaced by the new iteration of the DRV)

== See also ==
- List of fire departments
- Rescue squad
