= Affin Hwang Capital =

- Industry: Financial services
- Founded: 2014; 12 years ago
- Defunct: 2022
- Headquarters: Kuala Lumpur, Malaysia
- Key people: Datuk Maimoonah Hussain (former Group Managing Director); Tunku Afwida Binti Tunku A.Malek (former Chairman); Ng Meng Wah (former Officer-in-Charge)
- Products: Investment Banking; Securities
- AUM: ▲RM1.537 billion (2022)
- Parent: Affin Bank Berhad
- Website: www.affinhwang.com

Affin Hwang Capital was the brand name used by the Affin Hwang capital markets group, a specialist Malaysian-based investment banking and asset management group formed by the merger between Affin Investment Bank Berhad and Hwang-DBS (Malaysia) Berhad in September 2014.

Affin Hwang Capital provided capital markets advisory and execution services in investment banking, institutional and retail securities, and also offered asset management services until its subsidiary, Affin Hwang Asset Management Berhad, was sold to CVC Capital Partners in July 2022.

The group was composed of two core entities, Affin Hwang Investment Bank Berhad (investment banking and securities) and Affin Hwang Asset Management Berhad (asset management). It was among the largest brokerages and asset managers in Malaysia.

== History ==
In January 2014, Affin Holdings Berhad announced plans to acquire Hwang-DBS Investment Bank Berhad and the asset management and futures businesses of Hwang-DBS.

Affin Holdings Berhad paid RM1,363 million for the acquisition, and the transaction was completed on 7 April 2014.

The subsequent merger of Affin Investment Bank Berhad and Hwang-DBS which was completed on 22 September 2014 created a new investment banking group - Affin Hwang Investment Bank Berhad - which began operating under the brand name of Affin Hwang Capital.

The acquisition and subsequent merger and integration of the Affin Investment Banking and Hwang-DBS franchises was led by Datuk Maimoonah Hussain, the then Group Managing Director of the combined group.

Prior to the formation of Affin Hwang Capital, Affin Investment Bank entered into a partnership with Japanese investment bank, Daiwa Securities Group Inc. on 13 December 2013. The agreements of partnership were carried over to Affin Hwang Capital.

In 2015, Affin Hwang Capital and Thai-based Thanachart Securities PCL entered a strategic business alliance for collaboration in the area of institutional equities trading and research.

Subsequently, in 2016, Affin Hwang Capital signed a business alliance with PT Bahana Securities, a wholly owned securities subsidiary of PT Bahana Pembinaan Usaha Indonesia. The joint distribution and marketing agreement enabled Affin Hwang Capital to work jointly with Bahana to distribute Indonesian securities to clients in Malaysia.

Use of the Affin Hwang Capital brand ceased upon the rebranding exercise undertaken by its parent company, Affin Bank, in 2020, when the group adopted the brand identity of its parent, Affin Bank Berhad.

Subsequently, Affin Hwang Investment Bank divested its asset management business, Affin Hwang Asset Management, to European-headquartered private equity group CVC Capital Partners in July 2022, marking the end of the group as a capital markets player with integrated asset management capabilities.
