= Boustead Holdings =

Malaysian conglomerate

Boustead Holdings Berhad

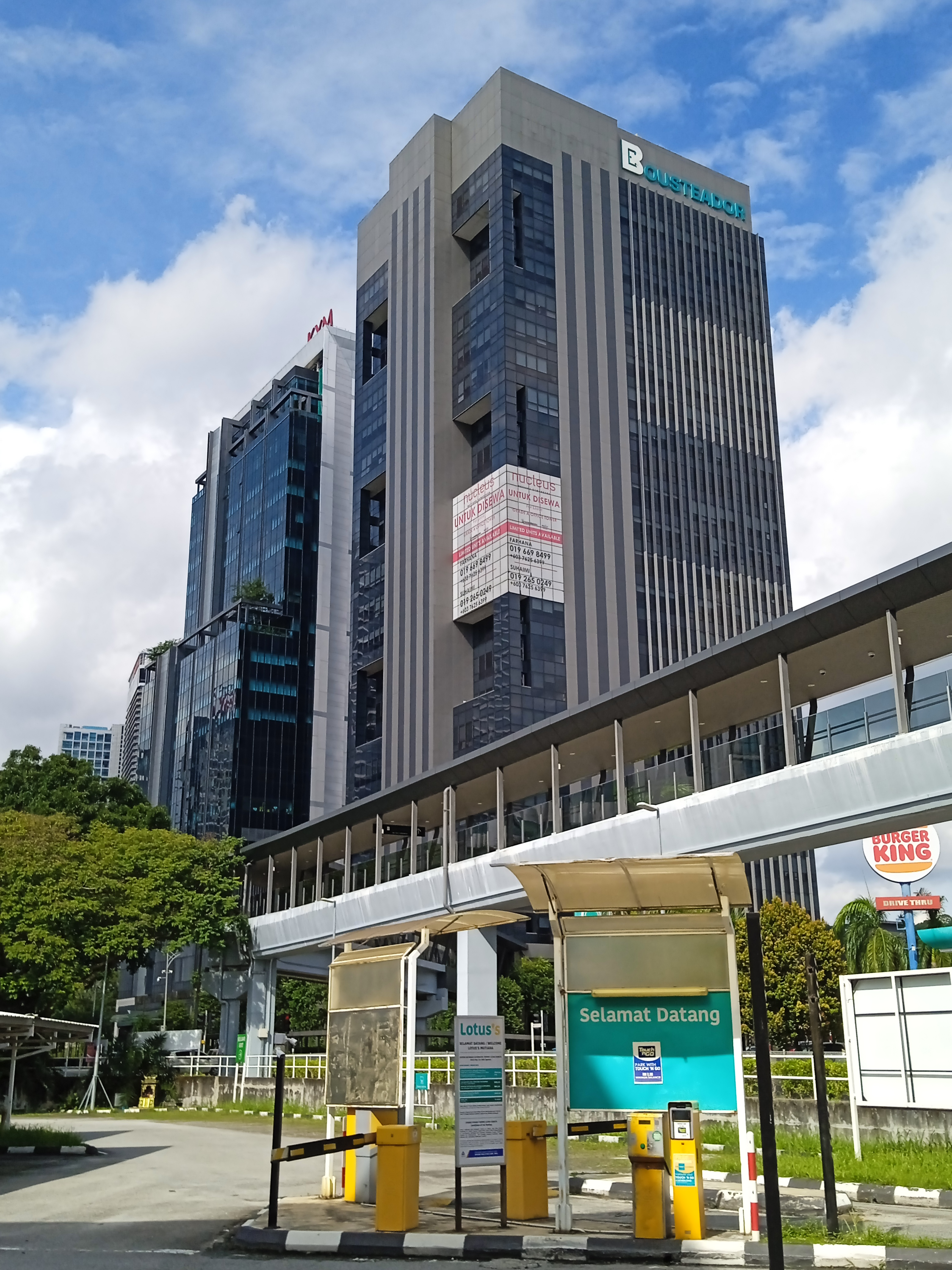
- Company type: Public limited company
- Traded as: MYX: 2771; SGX: F9D
- ISIN: MYL2771OO003
- Predecessor: Boustead & Co
- Founded: 1828; 198 years ago (as Boustead & Co.); 1961; 65 years ago (current entity)
- Headquarters: Level 23, The Bousteador, 10, Jalan PJU 7/6, Mutiara Damansara, 47800 Petaling Jaya, Selangor, Malaysia
- Key people: Izaddeen Daud (Group Chief Executive Officer)
- Number of employees: 16,000+ (2022)
- Parent: Armed Forces Fund Board
- Subsidiaries: Pharmaniaga Bhd, Boustead Heavy Industries Corporation Bhd, Boustead Properties Bhd, UAC Bhd, Boustead Hotels & Resorts SB, Boustead Petroleum Marketing SB, among others
- Website: www.boustead.com.my

Boustead Holdings Berhad (BHB) (MYX: 2771) is a Malaysian corporation based in Kuala Lumpur. The company has over 16,000 employees across more than 90 listed and non-listed companies in Malaysia, Indonesia and the United Kingdom. It is an affiliate of the Malaysian military.

BHB was founded in 1828 as Boustead & Co in Singapore by Edward Boustead, an English businessman. The company was incorporated in 1961, and is currently listed on the Bursa Malaysia main board.

== History ==
In 1975, Boustead & Co split into four entities: Boustead Plc in London (which was later reorganized as Boustead & Co), Boustead Holdings Berhad (BHB) in Malaysia, Boustead Singapore Limited, and Boustead China Co, Ltd.

The major shareholder of BHB is Malaysian military pension fund statutory board – Armed Forces Fund Board.

== Organisation ==
The Group’s business interests are focused in key sectors of the Malaysian economy via its five Divisions:

=== Property & Industrial ===
The division engages primarily in property development and investment, hotel management (under the Royale Chulan hotel chain), project management as well as manufacture and distribution of cellulose fibre cement products.

=== Pharmaceutical ===
The division is the largest listed pharmaceutical group in Malaysia and involved in various segments of the pharmaceutical value chain, from research and development to the manufacturing of generic drugs, over-the-counter medicines and nutraceuticals, logistics and distribution, regulatory, sales and marketing as well as retail pharmacy.

=== Heavy Industries ===
The Division (Boustead Heavy Industries Corporation) caters to the defence security, marine and aerospace sectors, providing a range of services to Government and commercial clients including shipbuilding, ship repair, maintenance, repair and overhaul (MRO), manufacturing of components and systems, maritime training and integrated logistics support, among others.

=== Trading, Finance & Investment ===
Under this division, Boustead is involved in diverse sectors within the Malaysian economy with core businesses include a home-grown retail petroleum network, the provision of financial products as well as travel and tourism related services.

=== Subsidiaries ===
Its major subsidiaries include , Pharmaniaga, and BHPetrol.

Its subsidiary Pharmaniaga was appointed as the distributor of Sinovac COVID-19 vaccine for the Malaysian market during the COVID-19 pandemic.

Boustead also operates The Curve mall in Damansara, Selangor. The mall is connected to an IKEA store.
