= 2022 Batang Kali landslide =

Natural disaster in Selangor, Malaysia

Batang Kali landslide
- Native name: Tragedi Batang Kali
- English name: Batang Kali tragedy
- Date: 16 December 2022; 3 years ago
- Time: ~2:00 am (MST)
- Location: Father's Organic Farm, off Selangor State Route B66, Batang Kali, Selangor, Malaysia; 03°25′24″N 101°45′14″E
- Cause: Landslide
- Participants: 92
- Deaths: 31
- Injuries: 8

A landslide occurred in the early hours of 16 December 2022 near the Malaysian town of Batang Kali, Selangor, displacing 450,000 m^{3} (16 million cu ft) of soil and burying campsites at an organic farm. The accident trapped 92 people under the collapsed slope; most were campers from the farm. 31 people were killed and 61 were rescued, with 8 people requiring hospitalisation.

The disaster led to a suspension of all outdoor recreational activities in Batang Kali, and the temporary closing of all picnic and camping spots throughout Selangor. It was described as the worst landslide in Malaysia in 2022, as well as the second deadliest disaster in Malaysian history after the collapse of Highland Towers in 1993, also occurred within Selangor, which account for the deaths of 48 people.

== History ==
=== Background ===
Father's Organic Farm is an organic farm located 15 kilometres outside of Batang Kali, Selangor, a town on the foothills of the Titiwangsa Range, approximately 50 kilometres (30 mi) north of Kuala Lumpur and roughly 15 kilometres (9 mi) west of Genting Highlands in the neighbouring state of Pahang. The farm filed an application to begin organic farming activities in 2019 but had operated a campsite on the farm since 2020 without a licence, required for campsites near high-risk areas, such as rivers, hillslopes, or waterfalls. The campsite consisted of three sectors: Hilltop, Farmview, and Riverside.

Due to Batang Kali's proximity to the Klang Valley, combined with local school holiday seasons on December, many families were visiting the area as a popular recreational destination. Ninety-two people were present around the vicinity on the evening of 15 December. On the night of the landslide, 81 people (51 adults and 30 children) had been registered to stay overnight at the farm. The campers were mostly families instead of school or university students. Despite precise records being kept, there were fears that the figures were inaccurate as children below the age of four were not required to be registered to stay at the campsite.

=== Landslide ===
The landslide began before 2:30 am MST. According to surveys and calculations from the Mineral and Geoscience Department (JMG), it involved a slope failure of 450,000 cubic metres (16,000,000 cu ft) of soil, across an area of 500 metres (1,600 ft) and 200 metres (660 ft), with a depth of 8 metres (26 ft). The landslide covered an area of 300 metres (980 ft) from an altitude of 70 metres (230 ft). The collapsed slope directly impacted the grounds of all three campsites and produced a field of rubble 30 metres (98 ft) high, covering an area of 1.21 acres (0.49 ha). Damage was especially severe in Hilltop and Farmview, as they were near the top of the collapsed hillside.

== Aftermath ==
=== Rescue operations ===
The first distress call related to the landslide was reported at 2:42 am, with members from search and rescue (SAR) teams arriving at the scene at 3:04 am. First responders reported that the initial disaster site was chaotic, with survivors signalling rescuers with torchlights. Nearly 400 SAR workers from 15 government agencies were deployed for rescue efforts. Six tracking dogs were initially used for SAR operations. The SAR team was later expanded to over 700 rescue workers, eight excavators, and eleven police dog units.

Due to the severity of the destruction at Hilltop and Farmview, the SAR team initially placed their focus on both sectors, where 231 rescue workers were dispatched to locate trapped victims. Additional assistance was provided by the Federal Reserve Unit (FRU) and the General Operations Force (GOF).

SAR operations were halted after midnight due to weather conditions. It was resumed at 7:30 am the next day with the presence of 150 rescue workers. The Selangor Fire and Rescue Department (JBPM) announced that it had moved its focus towards Farmview and Riverside, as the body of the latest victim found at the time was discovered between the two sectors. They also reported that muddy soil conditions and continued water flow at the site had complicated rescue efforts, with 45-degree slopes and thick layers of landslide debris 6.1 to 9.1 m (20 to 30 ft) in height presenting a risk for further slippage.

On 17 December, Selangor JBPM director Norizam Khamis said that survival chances for missing victims were slim. He stated that survivors might be found if they were trapped near uprooted trees or large rocks that provided room for breathing. He also reported that he would discuss with the police the extension of SAR operations if the remaining victims could not be found after a week. SAR operations were suspended once more at 6:00 pm due to bad weather, before resuming at 9:00 am the following day. The operation involved the removal of a layer of soil and debris 3–4 ft (0.91–1.22 m) thick with excavators but brought no new findings.

On 19 December, Supt Suffian Abdullah, the Officer-in-chief of the police district (OCPD) of Hulu Selangor, said 125 people were involved in SAR operations that day, with the aid of eleven excavators and nine tracking dogs. A sweeper team was later dispatched to search areas surrounding the disaster site after SAR teams failed to locate the remaining nine missing victims. During the night, ground-penetrating radar from the Department of Survey and Mapping (JUPEM) detected foreign objects in five separate locations, resulting in SAR operations shifting their focus towards the five locations.

Following the discovery of the 26th body on 21 December, Selangor JBPM announced that it would end SAR operations in Farmview.

=== Government response ===
As a precaution against additional landslides, the Royal Malaysia Police in Hulu Selangor ordered the immediate suspension of all outdoor recreational activities around Batang Kali until further notice. This rule was extended to all campsites situated around high-risk areas throughout the country for seven days, starting from the day of the disaster.

An official visit was made by the Deputy Minister of Women, Family and Community Development Aiman Athirah Sabu at 12.35 pm MST, accompanied by several officials and counselors, to ensure that survivors would receive adequate essential supplies. Some survivors were traumatised due to concerns over their missing family members.

The communications and digital minister, Fahmi Fadzil, announced the prime minister, Anwar Ibrahim, and several ministers' intentions to visit the campsite, while reminding staff of the Ministry of Communications and Digital (KKD) to verify and disseminate authentic information or news of the landslide to the public.

Inspections from the Ministry of Works (KKR) and the Selangor Public Works Department (JKRS) on a 5 metres (16 ft) stretch of route B66, in close proximity of the collapsed slope in the landslide, brought no further concerns as open cracks were not spotted on the paved road. However, the road was cordoned off to all vehicles. At the same time, Resorts World Genting and KKR separately issued notices advising motorists travelling to Genting Highlands to use the Karak Expressway as an alternative route.

Selangor JBPM installed sensors at three locations near the disaster site to measure soil movement, in order to monitor the risk of further landslides.

The road is reopened one and a half year after the incident on 1 July 2024, with the cost of repairs estimated at RM19 million.

=== Casualties ===
Reported casualties by sectors
Sector	Victims	Deaths
Hilltop	42	21
Farmview	12	1
Riverside	26	4
Green House	14	0
Total	92	26+
Source: NADMA

In a tweet published at 9:15 am MST on 16 December, the National Disaster Management Agency (NADMA) reported 8 deaths and 53 rescued individuals, with 7 injuries. The seven injured people were sent to Kuala Kubu Bharu Hospital, Selayang Hospital and Kuala Lumpur Hospital for treatment. At 11.00 am MST, 9 deaths were reported, with 25 people declared missing. The dead were sent to Kuala Lumpur Hospital for postmortem examination.

By 11:30 am MST, the total death toll stood at 11 people, including one child. During this period, eight more survivors, including the campsite's operator, were also rescued. In the span of one hour and fifteen minutes, five additional bodies were discovered and taken to Kuala Lumpur Hospital. Casualty figures were later revised by the Ministry of Local Government Development (KPKT) at 1:00 pm MST to 16 killed, 17 missing and 61 survivors. Three Singaporeans were reported among the rescued.

Selangor JBPM director Norazam Khamis reported 19 deaths and 14 missing victims at 5:00 pm. The 17th and 18th bodies, believed to be a mother and her three-year-old daughter, were discovered at 4:40 pm in Riverside. They were identified as campers situated around Hilltop and Farmview, but their bodies were believed to have been washed downstream. The 19th body was discovered at 5:00 pm. Deputy prime minister Ahmad Zahid Hamidi reported 21 deaths and 12 missing victims at 7:10 pm.

Three more bodies were discovered at Hillview the next day, bringing the death toll to 24. The 22nd and 23rd bodies were identified as a mother and her son, while the 24th body was of a female child. On 18 December, NADMA confirmed that autopsies for all 24 discovered bodies were complete, while three survivors were still under treatment.

No more bodies were discovered until 20 December, when the body of another female child was found in Riverside. The body, buried 17 metres (56 ft) deep in soil near a large boulder, was found without any visible injuries. The 26th body was discovered by accident at Farmview on 21 December. Selangor JPBM identified the body as a male camper from Hilltop whose body was washed downstream. He was found while still hugging the carcass of one of his pet dogs. Another dog carcass was found nearby.

SAR operations were suspended twice on 22 December. Despite this, rescuers discovered four more bodies in Riverside, buried 7 metres (23 ft) deep in soil. Following the discovery, Selangor police chief Arjunaidi Mohamed announced that there were two redundant entries on the Father's Organic Farm's registry, reducing the number of victims involved in the incident to 92. At the time of the announcement, only one victim was declared missing, as opposed to three victims as previously reported.

Hulu Selangor OCPD, Supt Suffian Abdullah stated that most bodies "did not feature many visible injuries", thus identification through sight by their families did not present a challenge.

The following are the identities of the 31 victims who perished in the incident:

LIST OF VICTIMS
1. Eng Huai Yi (girl, 12)	2. Eng Choon Wen (male, 43)	3. Ka Kok Bun (male, 43)	4. Ka Sin Ya Vanya (girl, 6)
5. Fong Choy Kee (female, 43)	6. Daniel Khor Yen (boy, 5)	7. Chin Su King (female, 36)	8. Lai Chee Sam (male, 33)
9. Lai See Tin (female, 33)	10. Jonas Lai Ze Kai (boy, 2)	11. Giselle Lai Yu Xi (girl, 6)	12. Tong Kai En (boy, 9)
13. Lai Lee Koon (female, 44)	14. Wong Kim Yap (male, 34)	15. Wong Zi Hang (boy, 1)	16. Gain Choo Yin (female, 35)
17. Wong Hao Yee (girl, 6)	18. Tai Jing Kay (boy, 7)	19. Tai Jing Rou (girl, 4)	20. Yu Siew Pay (female, 34)
21. Tai Chang Lin (male, 35)	22. Lim Wei Xin (female, 36)	23. Hong Mei Jing (female, 38)	24. Nurul Azwani Kamaruzaman (female, 31)
25. Lai Lee Yin (female, 37)	26. Zech Loh Qi Yi (boy, 7)	27. Ng Yee Tong (girl, 11)	28. Lam Sook Man (female, 37)
29. Liu Pei Si (female, 44)	30. Ng Chay Diok (male, 67)	31. Eng Shao Qi (boy,11)

==== Mun Choong primary school camping group ====
Twenty-three campers were teachers from Mun Choong primary school (Chinese: 民众小学) in Kuala Lumpur. The camping group, who had been in the site since 14 December, were expected to check out with their family members on the day the landslide struck. Twenty-six people associated with the school perished in the incident, including canteen workers, students, and six teachers.

By 1:00 pm MST on 16 December, six people from the group were rescued. In a press conference that included students and the school's parent–teacher association chairperson, education minister Fadhlina Sidek reported that deceased victims from the school were being identified in the Sungai Buloh Hospital's forensic department. She stated that despite the group's trip not being an official school event, the Ministry of Education (KPM) would provide assistance to the related victims. At this time only two teachers had been rescued, with the others still missing.

On the day after the landslide, a makeshift memorial consisting of bouquets of flowers was created at the gates of the primary school, as a tribute to the deceased members of the camping group. The school also received donations to support the victims' families.

== Investigation ==
=== Controversy over operating licences ===
Local government development minister Nga Kor Ming reported that the destroyed campsites were operated without a licence. The campsite operator, however, said that he had not been able to apply for a licence for the campsite because one did not exist. The Hulu Selangor Municipal Council (MPHS) later issued a statement that while a specific licence for campsites did not exist, it was the responsibility of the business to obtain a business licence, and that such an application could be considered for a "recreational centre licence". The MPHS in the same statement called for a specific policy regulating campsites to be enacted. Selangor state executive council member Ng Sze Han subsequently stated that it was the campsite operator's responsibility to obtain a business licence once it began charging fees to the public, but Father's Organic Farm had not applied for a business licence. Ng announced that Selangor would introduce new regulations around campsite activities, after first taking a census of operating campsites and their locations and engaging in public consultation.

== Reactions ==
=== Domestic ===
Anwar Ibrahim
(@anwaribrahim)
tweeted:

Malay:

Dikejutkan dengan insiden tanah runtuh di tapak perkhemahan Father's Organic Farm dekat jalan menghubungkan Batang Kali dengan Genting Highland.

Translation:

Shocked by the landslide incident in the Father's Organic Farm campsite close to the road connecting Batang Kali and the Genting Highlands.

16 December 2022

- Prime Minister's office – Prime Minister Anwar Ibrahim expressed his concern and shock over the event while announcing that he will visit the disaster site the night after the landslide. He also urged Malaysians to pray for the success of rescue efforts in the disaster, while advising ministers involved "not to interfere" with search and rescue work.
- (Malaysia) Federal government – Government ministers such as Nga Kor Ming, Saifuddin Nasution Ismail, Fahmi Fadzil and Nik Nazmi were reportedly planning relief visits.
- Selangor – Sharafuddin, Sultan of Selangor, and Norashikin, Tengku Permaisuri of Selangor, both expressed sympathy towards the victims in the disaster. Amirudin Shari, the Menteri Besar of Selangor, stated he would accompany the prime minister on a visit to the landslide site on the evening after the disaster occurred.
- Johor – Ibrahim Ismail, the sultan of Johor, expressed his condolences, stating, "Our thoughts and prayers are with the victims and their families at this trying time. May they be granted the strength and fortitude to pull through this agonising period,"
- Pahang – Wan Rosdy Wan Ismail, the Menteri Besar of Pahang, announced that Pahang would send rescue workers and volunteers to assist in relief efforts at Batang Kali.

=== International ===
- Singapore – Prime Minister Lee Hsien Loong and Foreign Affairs Minister Vivian Balakrishnan thanked Malaysia for assisting Singaporean victims involved in the disaster. They stated that the Singapore Civil Defence Force is ready to assist in search and rescue efforts if necessary.
- Egypt – Egyptian Foreign Ministry on behalf of the Egypt's government has expressed its sincere condolences to Malaysia and mourned the tragedy of the landslide on Thursday, 22 December 2022, through the Egyptian Embassy in Kuala Lumpur

=== Non-governmental organisations ===
- Sahabat Alam Malaysia (SAM) – SAM president Meenakshi Raman urged authorities to set up a commission of inquiry to identify the cause of the landslide. She questioned the legality of the campsites' locations below a hilly area.
- Ecological Association of Malaysia (EAM) – EAM president Ahmad Ismail advised that all developments in highland areas such as Genting Highlands, Cameron Highlands and Mount Jerai should be closely monitored and adhere to existing laws.
- Rimba Disclosure – Rimba Disclosure called for authorities to halt all ongoing construction projects and permanently abandon future developments around Genting Highlands. They stated that they were "appalled" that the local government approved development on these lands despite regulations prohibiting them.
- Tzu Chi – Tzu Chi deployed 50 volunteers to the Ulu Yam police station and three hospitals to assist victims and provide counseling.

== See also ==
- Highland Towers collapse
- 2008 Bukit Antarabangsa landslide
- 2011 Hulu Langat landslide
- List of landslides

Geology-related articles

- Soil mechanics
- Slope stability analysis
