= Ulu Kelang =

Mukim in Gombak, Selangor, Malaysia

- Mukim in Malaysia
- Ulu Kelang in Selangor, Malay Peninsular and Malaysia Ulu Kelang (Peninsular Malaysia) Ulu Kelang (Malaysia)
- Coordinates: 3°10′44.74″N 101°46′3.69″E
- Country: Malaysia
- State: Selangor
- District: Gombak

Government
  - Body: Ampang Jaya Municipal Council

Area
  - Total: 16.94 km^{2} (6.54 sq mi)
- Time zone: UTC+8 (MYT)
- Postal code: 68000

Ulu Kelang (alternately Hulu Kelang, Ulu Klang, or Hulu Klang), is a mukim and a state constituency in Gombak District, Selangor, Malaysia. It is one of five state constituencies administered by Majlis Perbandaran Ampang Jaya (MPAJ).

A map of Ulu Kelang within Gombak District.

== Geography ==
It has an area of 16.94 square kilometres, and is located northeast of Kuala Lumpur. The surface is relatively high; 500 metres above sea level, and the topography here is highland, lowland, or undulating land. As a result, it is a rain catchment area for the Klang River. Among the high locations are Bukit Antarabangsa, Bukit Kemensah, and Bukit Belacan. The hill is composed of limestone, which is brittle and dissolves during heavy rains. As a result, several landslides have occurred in this area, forcing people mainly living in flats, as well as some houses on the hillside, to evacuate. A notable incident is the collapse of Highland Towers in 1993. Moreover, the flow of the Klang River was straightened in several places, which caused water to flow faster, leading Kuala Lumpur to experience flash floods on June 10, 2007.

== Public facilities ==
Many factories, housing estates, and tourist attractions have been built. A notable factory is Texas Instrument, and the DBP warehouse can also be found here. Zoo Negara has forests which are typically explored and developed, which has affected the environment. Other strategic places include waterfalls in Bukit Belacan and Hulu Kemensah, as well as a trail from Kemensah to the top of Gunung Nuang in Hulu Langat for mountain climbers.

== List of residential areas ==
- Taman Melawati
- Taman Permata
- Bukit Antarabangsa
- Villa Sri Ukay
- Taman Hillview
- Ukay Heights
- Ukay Perdana
- Estana Court
- Kemensah Heights
- Dataran Ukay
- Taman Sri Ukay
- Taman Pinggiran Ukay
- Taman Keramat including Lembah Keramat (AU5), Taman Seri Keramat Tengah (AU4), Taman Desa Keramat (AU3), Taman Keramat AU2, and Taman Keramat Permai (AU1).
- Kelang Gates
- Taman Andaman Ukay

== Representatives ==
The Ulu Kelang is located within Gombak parliamentary constituency and Hulu Kelang state constituency.

== See also ==
- Highland Towers collapse
- 2002 Taman Hillview Bungalow Collapse
- 2006 Kampung Pasir landslide
- 2008 Bukit Antarabangsa landslide
