= Armed Forces Fund Board =

Malaysian pension fund

Lembaga Tabung Angkatan Tentera Armed Forces Fund Board
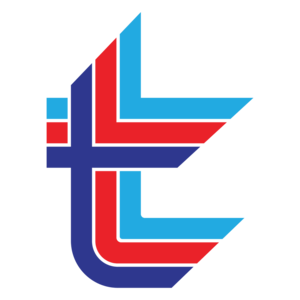
- Company type: Statutory body
- Industry: Pension fund; Investment management
- Founded: August 1972; 53 years ago
- Headquarters: Chulan Tower; No.3, Jalan Conlay, Kuala Lumpur, Malaysia
- Key people: YBhg.General Tan Sri Dato’ Sri Azizan bin Ariffin (Retired) (Chairman); Encik Mohammad Ashraf bin Md Radzi (CE)
- Revenue: ▲RM13.1 billion (2016)^{[a]}
- Operating income: ▲RM1.7 billion (2016)^{[a]}
- Net income: ▲RM1.2 billion (2016)^{[a]}
- Total assets: ▲RM89.1 billion (2016)^{[a]}
- Total equity: ▲RM18.8 billion (2016)^{[a]}
- Number of employees: 350
- Parent: Ministry of Defense
- Subsidiaries: Boustead Holdings Berhad; Affin Holdings Berhad
- Website: www.ltat.gov.my
- Footnotes / references^{1} Consolidated figures including results, assets, liabilities and equity of subsidiaries of the fund.

The Armed Forces Fund Board (also commonly known by its Malay name Lembaga Tabung Angkatan Tentera and LTAT in short) is a statutory body which manages the pension fund for certain members of the Malaysian Armed Forces. LTAT was established in August 1972 by the Armed Forces Fund Act (also known as the Tabung Angkatan Tentera Act). The fund is considered the smallest among Malaysian government-linked investment companies, and owns controlling stakes in several public listed companies in Malaysia, including Boustead Holdings and Affin Holdings. It is overseen by the Ministry of Defence.

For officers, participation in the fund is voluntary, with no contribution towards their accounts by the Government of Malaysia. Armed forces members of other ranks (compulsory contributors) are required to contribute a portion of their monthly salary to LTAT, with the government contributing as employer. A compulsory non-pensionable contributor receives his/her retirement benefit in the form of a lump sum payment when he dies (next-of-kin), retires or is discharged from service, or reaches the age of 50. A compulsory pensionable contributor receives his/her retirement benefit on his/her death (next-of-kin), retirement or reaching the age of 50 in the form of a lump sum payment of his/her contribution, while the government-contributed portion is transferred to Retirement Fund (Incorporated) (the civil service pension fund) which then administers monthly pension payments. Voluntary members may withdraw their contributions at any time.

The fund had RM10 billion in assets under management at the end of 2017.
