= National Disaster Management Agency =

Japanese government agency

The National Disaster Management Agency of Japan was launched on 2 November 2026. The agency is to oversee preparedness, and is tasked to serve as the central command for emergency response, and recovery efforts.

The agency is placed directly under the cabinet supervision and is headed by the prime minister Sanae Takaichi, and the reconstruction minister Goshi Hosono serving concurrently as disaster management minister.
