= 2006 Kampung Pasir landslide =

Landslide in Malaysia

2006 Kampung Pasir mudslide
- Kampung Pasir (Malaysia)
- Date: 31 May 2006
- Location: Ulu Klang, Selangor, Malaysia
- Deaths: 4
- Displaced: 141

The 2006 Kampung Pasir landslide was a landslide that occurred on 31 May 2006, in Kampung Pasir, Ulu Klang, Selangor, Malaysia. Two women were killed and two children were feared buried alive in a landslide that flattened three blocks of longhouses in Kampung Pasir, Ulu Klang here.

"The 2006 Kampung Pasir disaster highlighted the fact that man-made slopes needed to be built according to guidelines, just like any other infrastructure such as roads and bridges."
