= Malaysia Civil Defence Force =

Malaysian civil defence agency

Malaysia Civil Defence Force (MCDF)
- Angkatan Pertahanan Awam Malaysia (APM)

Agency overview
- Formed: 1939; 87 years ago
- Preceding agencies: Jabatan Pertahanan Awam Malaysia (JPAM); Jabatan Pertahanan Awam (JPA3)
- Jurisdiction: Government of Malaysia
- Headquarters: Angkatan Pertahanan Awam Malaysia, Jalan Maktab Perguruan Islam, Sungai Merab, 43000 Kajang, Selangor Darul Ehsan.
- Motto: Sedia, Pantas, Berintegriti (Readiness, Speed, Integrity)
- Minister responsible: Ahmad Zahid Hamidi, Deputy Prime Minister
- Agency executives: Aminurrahim Mohamed, Chief Commissioner; Abdul Wahab Haji Rahim, Deputy Chief Commissioner; Ismail Mohd Zamawi, Deputy Chief Commissioner
- Parent agency: Prime Minister's Department
- Key document: Malaysia Civil Defence Force Act 1951
- Website: civildefence.gov.my

The Malaysia Civil Defence Force (Malay: Angkatan Pertahanan Awam Malaysia; popularly known as APM or MCDF; formerly JPAM or JPA3) is the civil defence services agency in Malaysia. Until 31 August 2016 it was known as the Civil Defence Department (Malay: Jabatan Pertahanan Awam Malaysia).

== History ==
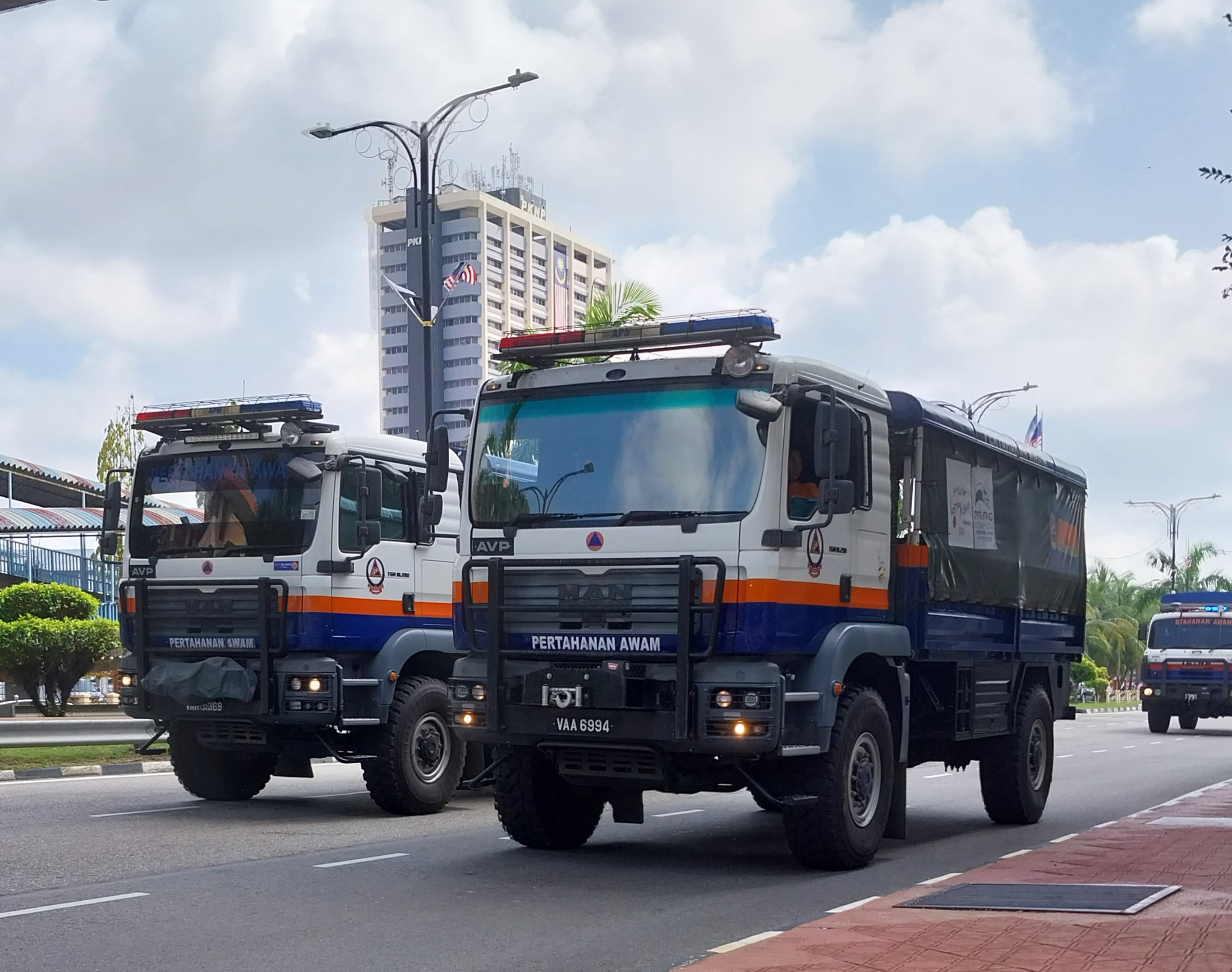
MAN TG trucks of Malaysia Civil Defence Force.

=== Pre-independence ===
- 1939 - Civil Defence activities in British Malaya were initiated by the British Government. Passive Defence Emergency Regulation Enactment under Chapter 4 provided measures to mitigate the effects of Second World War.
- 1951 - The Civil Defence Ordinance, 1951 was enacted as a law, establishing civil defence as a national responsibility in the threat faced by the Malayan Emergency
- 1952 - Civil Defence Department was established on 24 March for carrying out the provisions of the Ordinance.

=== Post-independence ===
- 1957 - The Civil Defence Ordinance, 1951 converted into the Civil Defence Act 1951 (Act 221) upon the independence of the state
- 1958 - Civil defence became a permanent and important element in national defence system in accordance with the Ninth Schedule Federal Constitution.
- 1964 - Civil Defence is extended to Sabah, Sarawak and Singapore following the Malaysia - Indonesia confrontation (Cabinet Paper No. 302/314/64), Singapore detachment would later form the basis of the Singapore Civil Defence Force
- 1965 - Membership increased to 36,000 members with 37 branches in addition to new logistics equipment at that time available for nationwide deployment in both peace and war
- 1970 - Staffing deployment throughout the country made in accordance with the provisions of the National Service Act 1952 to the floods which swept across the country.
- 1972 - Civil Defence Act 1951 was amended to perform the duties and role in peace time to carry out disaster relief services in addition to the wartime duties as defined by the Act
- 1993 - The collapse of Highland Tower in Hulu Kelang kickstarts the transformation and modernization of the Civil Defence organisation in Malaysia

=== Development era ===
- 1994 - Introduction of JPA 3 nickname to distinguish with the Department of Public Service and the Department of Civil Aviation.
- 1995 - 991 Emergency Hotline was launched on 20 May as a sign of commitment to the Civil Defence Department to provide 24-hour emergency assistance.
- 1996 - Department of Civil Defence Development Plan designed to fully equip all the logistics and infrastructure requirements in the rescue movement.
- 2000 - All state capital across the country and six branch offices were now using the 991 hotline system.
- 2000 - Physical Project Development Plan projects implemented by seven Central and State Civil Defence is placing 7th District, including two new training centre project.
- 2001 - Seven Civil Defence Centre projects at state and district levels approved for implementation in the RMK 8 to all state capitals on the peninsula will have complex administrative, operational and training.
- 2004 - Motto 'Selangkah Kehadapan' was introduced as the Civil Defence Department staff's commitment to give its best 'Delivery Service' to the public in accordance with the increase in staffing in the department.
- 2006 - Introduced the slogan "Ready, Fast and Integrity" as a catalyst for the Civil Defence Department into a department of excellence.
- 2008 - The nickname change from JPA 3 to JPAM was launched by the Director General of Civil Defence himself in March during the Civil Defence Day celebration held in Ipoh.
- 2008 - The Malaysian Government introduced the 'One Country One Number' program as the 999-line call centre to consolidate the emergency lines that are used by the Royal Malaysia Police, the Ministry of Health, Fire and Rescue Department and Civil Defence Department Malaysia.
- 2015 - Authority for JPAM affairs as a national institution passed from Ministry of Home Affairs to the Prime Minister's Department.
- 2016 - JPAM becomes the Malaysia Civil Defence Force and a new wave of modernization programs are approved to be part of the 10th Malaysia Plan.

== Organisation ==
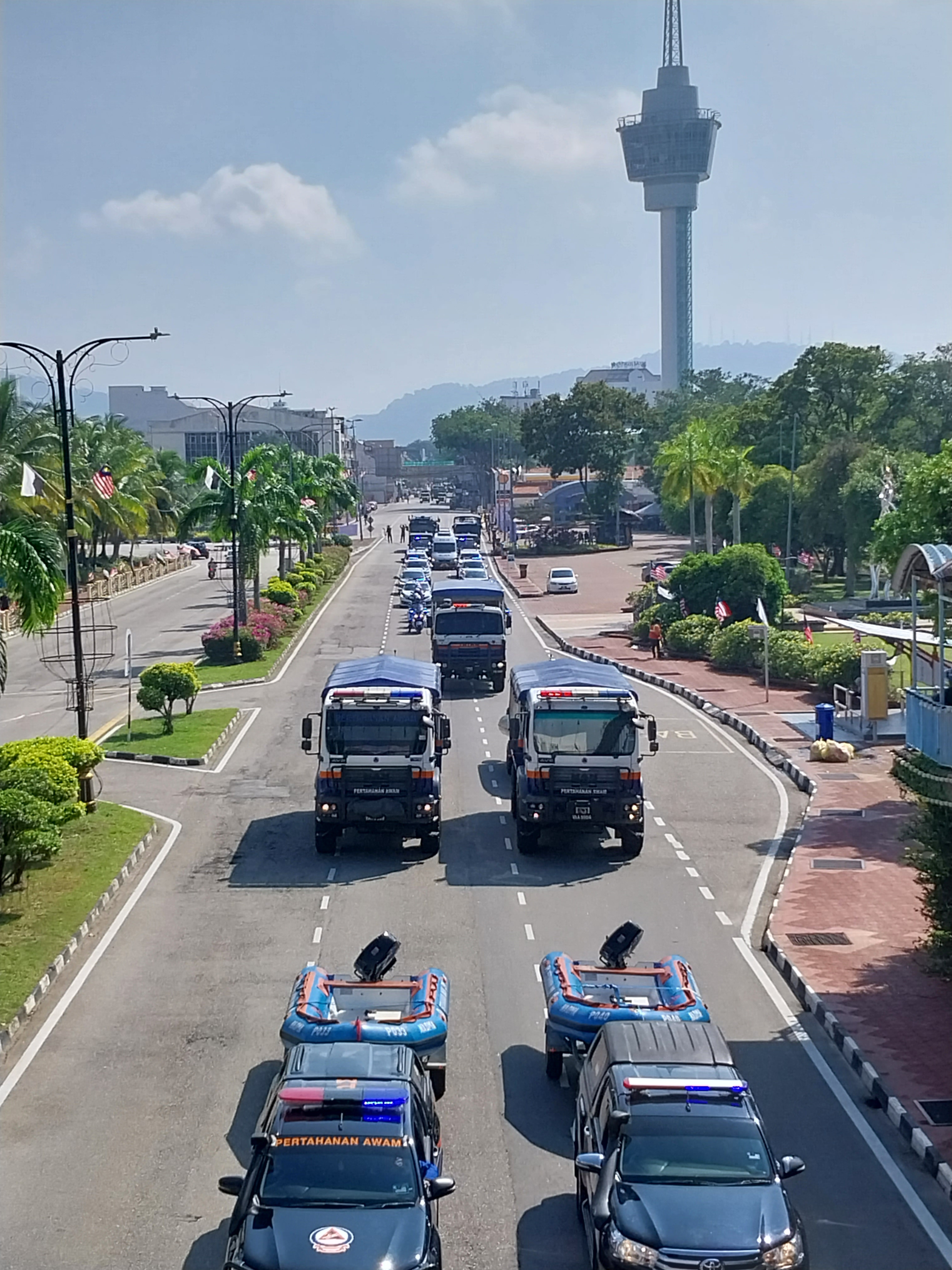
Malaysia Civil Defence Force's fleet in parade.

The National Headquarters encompasses all civil defence and search and rescue units nationwide, and reports to the Prime Minister's Department. As of 2017 Major General (R) Dato' Azmy Bin Yahya serves as its Chief Commissioner of Civil Defence.

The CDF is composed of:

- 14 State Commands
- 99 District Commands
- 55 Civil Defense Units
- and the Education and Training Command, comprising the Civil Defence Academy and the 3 Civil Defence Officer Cadet Schools

== Rank insignia ==
The rank system of the MCDF mirrors those used in the Singapore Civil Defence Force, but using the same civil grades as a government agency. In addition, an extra 3 ranks are used above Warrant Officer Class 1 and below Second Lieutenant, a singularity among uniformed forces.

Rank	Insignia	Gorget
Other ranks
Private		
Lance Corporal		
Corporal		
Sergeant		
Warrant officer
Sergeant Major 2		
Sergeant Major 1		
Staff officer
Junior Staff		
Senior Staff		
Higher Staff		
Officer corps
Second Lieutenant (CD)		
Lieutenant (CD)		
Captain (CD)		
Major (CD)		
Lieutenant Colonel (CD)		
Colonel (CD)		
Assistant Commissioner (CD)		
Deputy Commissioner (CD)		
Commissioner (CD)		
Chief Commissioner (CD)		

== Current inventory ==
=== Motorcycle ===
- Kawasaki Ninja 250R

=== 4x4 ===
- Toyota Hilux
- Nissan Navara
- Land Rover Defender
- Mitsubishi Pajero
- Isuzu 4x4

=== Truck ===
- MAN TG
- HICOM/DefTech Handalan
- Isuzu FSS
- Hino GT 4x4
- Tatra utility truck

=== Ambulance ===
- Toyota Hiace

=== Boat ===
- 14' aluminium boat
- 17' fiber boat
- Sealegs amphibious boat
