= Affin Bank =

Islamic bank in Malaysia

Affin Bank Group Berhad
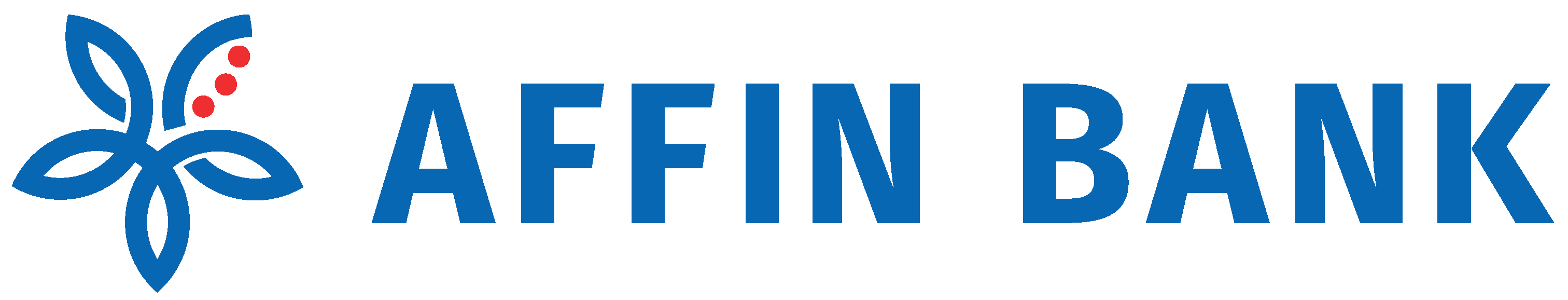

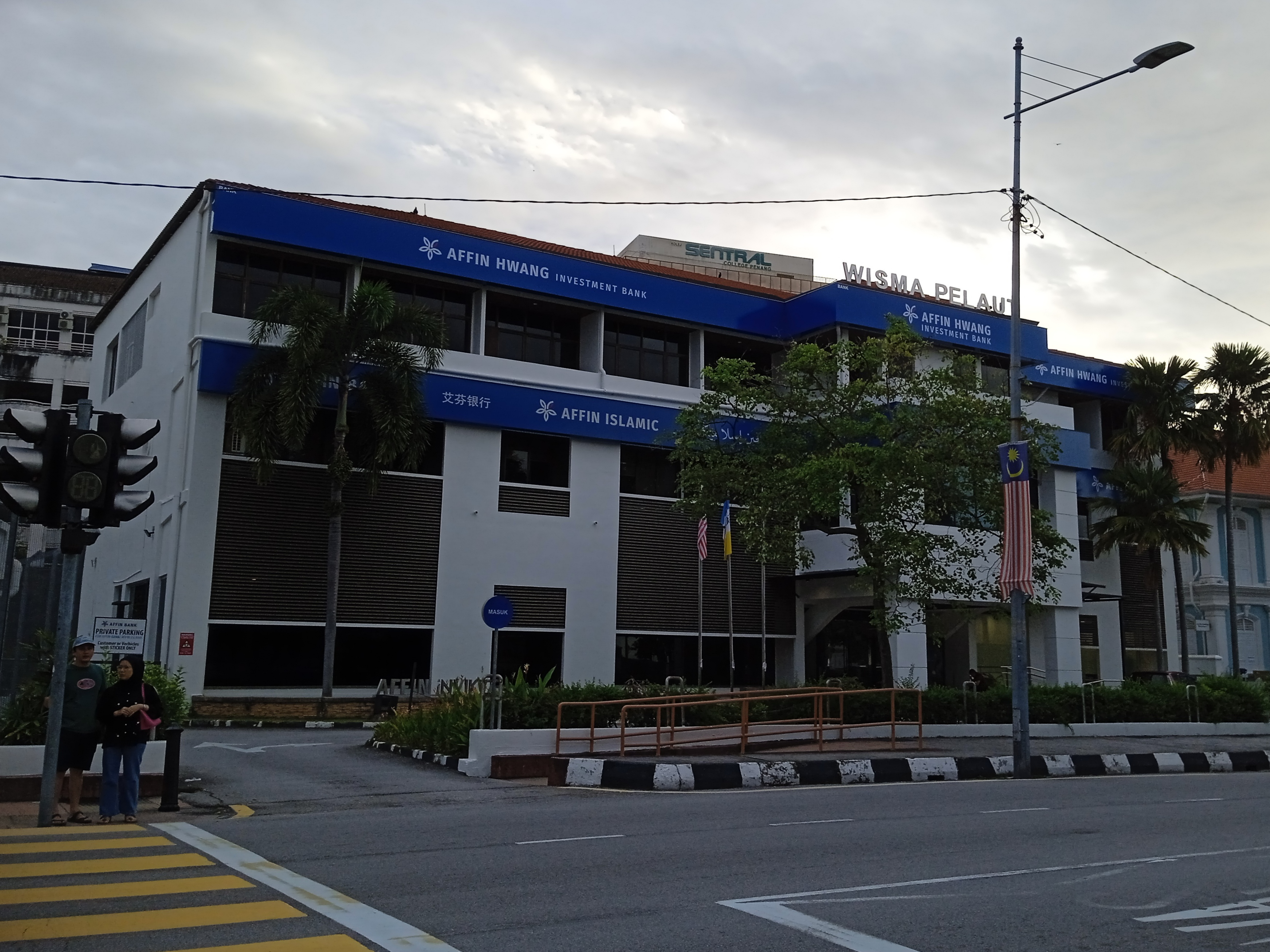
- Formerly: Perwira Habib Bank (M) Berhad (1975–1994); Perwira Affin Bank Berhad (1994–2000)
- Type: Public limited company
- Traded as: MYX: 5185
- ISIN: MYL5185OO003
- Industry: Banking
- Founded: 23 October 1975; 51 years ago
- Headquarters: Level 19, Menara AFFIN Lingkaran TRX, Tun Razak Exchange, 55188 Kuala Lumpur, Malaysia
- Number of locations: 126 branches
- Key people: Dato' Agil Natt (Chairman); Datuk Wan Razly Abdullah Wan Ali (President & Group CEO)
- Products: Financial services
- Number of employees: 9,800 (2024)
- Parent: Government of Sarawak (31.25%); Armed Forces Fund Board (28.79%); Boustead Holdings (20.73%)
- Subsidiaries: Affin Bank Berhad; Affin Islamic Bank Berhad; Affin Hwang Investment Bank Berhad; Affin Moneybrokers Sdn. Bhd.; Generali Insurance Malaysia Berhad; Generali Life Insurance Malaysia Berhad
- Website: www.affingroup.com

Affin Bank Group Berhad (MYX: 5185) is a Malaysian banking and financial services company headquartered at the Tun Razak Exchange, Kuala Lumpur. Established in 1975, the bank was owned by Affin Group Berhad, with Affin being an abbreviation of its former name, Armed Forces Finance and previously known as Perwira Habib Bank (M) Berhad and Perwira Affin Bank Berhad before adopted its present name on 30 August 2000.

Affin Bank provides financial products and services to both retail and corporate customers. The target business segments are categorized under key business units such as Community Banking, Enterprise Banking, Corporate Banking and Treasury. As of 16 July 2024, the bank has a network of 126 branches in Malaysia.

Affin Islamic Bank Berhad, its wholly owned subsidiary commenced operations on 1 April 2006 as a full-fledged Islamic bank, and offers Islamic Banking products and services for individuals and corporate which are in compliance with Shariah principles and laws.

== History ==
Affin Bank was established on 23 October 1975 as Perwira Habib Bank. The bank is a joint venture between Armed Forces Fund Board (LTAT), Syarikat Permodalan Kebangsaan Berhad (SPK) and Pakistani banking company, Habib Bank and began operations on 1 January 1976. The bank's launching ceremony was officiated on 23 October at the Hilton Hotel, Kuala Lumpur.

By September 1978, Perwira Habib Bank opens eight branches in several states including Malacca, Pahang and Terengganu. As of August 1979, the bank has 14 branches in Malaysia.

The bank's loans and advances including trade bills increased to RM731 million in 1983 despite the global economic recession. In 1987, the bank boosts its issued and paid-up capital by RM300 million to RM405 million.

The bank announced in February 1991 that it would underwent a capital restructuring scheme which involves the injection of new capital by existing shareholders and a capital reduction exercise to write off large accumulated losses.

On 21 April 1994, following its acquisition by Affin Holdings Berhad, Perwira Habib Bank changed its name to Perwira Affin Bank after Habib Bank divested its equity interest in the bank.

On 30 August 2000, the bank dropped the word 'Perwira' from its corporate name, changing it to simply as Affin Bank following its merger with BSN Commercial (M) Berhad.

== Ownership structure ==
The shareholders of Affin Bank consists of Armed Forces Fund Board (LTAT) which holds 28.79% stake. Its wholly owned subsidiary, Boustead Holdings holds 20.08%, this was followed by Bank of East Asia which holds the remaining 23.93% share. Since September 2024, the Sarawak Government through its wholly owned SG Assetfin Holdings become a major shareholder in Affin Bank, holding a 31.25% stake.

However, in November 2024, Boustead Holdings has ceased to be a shareholder of Affin Bank, after selling all the 482.11 million shares it held in the banking group, equivalent to a 20.08% stake. It is because Boustead Holdings sold 469.68 million shares to SG AssetFin Holdings Sdn Bhd (SAH), and the remaining 12.43 million shares to the open market. SAH is a wholly owned subsidiary of the Sarawak government.

== Corporate identity ==
Affin Bank's fifth logo, used from 2005 to 2020. This is the bank's only logo to use its wordmark instead of a hibiscus symbol.

Affin Bank introduces its iconographic logo upon its establishment in 1975. The bank incorporated a Hibiscus × rosa-sinensis, also known as the bunga raya, a national flower of Malaysia as its corporate logo, which underwent rebranding 4 times with the exception of its fifth logo, which only consists of the bank's wordmark which formerly stylized in italic as AFFINBANK (first used in 2000) rather than a hibiscus logo. The bank's sixth and current logo, a modernized version of the hibiscus, was introduced on 1 November 2020 and marks the return of its iconic hibiscus logo which was absent for 15 years.

The five petals is stands for Affin, which "acronymised to describe the core values of the bank as an organisation that is always innovating, adapting, placing customer first and emphasising integrity as its foundation", while its logo evolution represents its transformation "to emerge as a progressive bank of the future by embracing technology and adapting amid an ever-changing business environment". The bank also uses slogans for its identity. From 2005 to 2020, "Banking Without Barriers" (Perbankan Tanpa Sempadan) was its former slogan. Following its corporate rebranding in November 2020, Affin Bank introduces its new slogan, "Always About You" (Sentiasa Untuk Anda).

== See also ==
- List of banks
- List of banks in Malaysia
