= 2008 Bukit Antarabangsa landslide =

Landslide in Malaysia

Coordinates: 3.13°N 101.68°E

- Date: 6 December 2008; 17 years ago
- Time: 3:50 am MST
- Location: Bukit Antarabangsa, Ulu Klang, Selangor
- Cause: Landslide
- Deaths: 4
- Injuries: 15
- Convictions: None

The 2008 Bukit Antarabangsa landslide was a landslide that occurred on the early morning of 6 December 2008, at the town of Bukit Antarabangsa of Selangor, Malaysia. 4 people were killed while 15 others were injured from the incident. 14 houses were destroyed during the process. The landslide was colloquially referred with the Highland Towers collapse of 1993, due to its close proximity and similar circumstances.

== Background ==
Bukit Antarabangsa is a hillside township located at Ampang, Selangor. The township was known for housing numerous affluent celebrities and aristocrats of Malaysia. Prior to the 2008 landslide, the area was already known for being landslide-prone. In 1993, one of the towers of the Highland Towers, a gated apartment complex near Bukit Antarabangsa, collapsed after continuous rainfall eroded the soil under the foundations. 48 people were killed. In 1999, a major landslide occurred at the hill, trapping thousands of inhabitants.

== Rescue efforts ==
The landslide began on 3.50 a.m. local time, at a hillside encompassing two communities, Taman Bukit Mewah and Taman Bukit Utama, on Bukit Antarabangsa. Electricity was cut off at several townships nearby. Roads leading to residential properties at the two hills were destroyed, trapping hundreds of people. Soon after, search and rescue teams from several government agencies were launched to locate trapped victims on site.

Accompanied by then Malaysian Prime Minister Abdullah Badawi and Deputy Prime Minister Najib Razak, Sharafuddin, the Sultan of Selangor inspected the disaster site. The prime minister instructed the temporary halting of all construction projects surrounding Bukit Antarabangsa, until the land was declared safe by the Malaysian Institute of Public Works (IKRAM). Among the survivors, 93 people escaped unscathed, while 15 were sent to nearby hospitals for immediate medical aid. Over 3 to 5-thousand inhabitants were forced to evacuate for fear of further landslides. They were housed in temporary shelters set up at nearby schools. However, Musa Hassan, the Inspected-General of Police, remarked that many residents were reluctant with the temporary eviction. Four bodies were retrieved during the rescue operation.

The subsequent day, members of the Malaysian Armed Forces (MAF or ATM) constructed temporary bridges across the affected areas to reconnect the local roads. On 8 December 2008, all rescue efforts were formally called off. Electricity was restored to 1,500 households. Several politicians visited the site and urged for a revision in hillside developments, while the police notified all residents of Bukit Antarabangsa to lodge police reports in case of thefts or illegal break-ins.

== Investigation ==
On 25 November 2009, the Ampang Jaya Municipal Council (MPAJ) drafted a letter requesting information of the landslide to not be classified under the Official Secrets Act 1972. The application was made after the Malaysian Public Works Department (JKM) handed over a technical report pertaining to the landslide to the MPAJ, which led to the public announcement of the report's outcome. The Bukit Antarabangsa Landslide Investigation Report was officially released publicly on 5 December 2009, after Shaziman Abu Mansor, Minister of Works granted permission to declassify the findings. The government refuted accusations of the classification over reasons around Internet circulation, citing that the classification was "to follow standard protocols".

== Lawsuits ==
On 8 September 2010, three families filed a suit in the high court at Kuala Lumpur against Superview Development Sdn Bhd, a local development company, and the Selangor Water Supply Company (SYABAS) for criminal negligence in relation to the landslides. Amanullah Mohamed Yusoof, Harveen Kaur Balbhir Singh and K Thanarajah filed the suit separately. They were seeking compensation of approximately RM1.5-million to RM2.2-million (US$357,000 to US$524,000).

== See also ==
- 2011 Hulu Langat landslide
- 2022 Batang Kali landslide
