= Economy of Iraq =

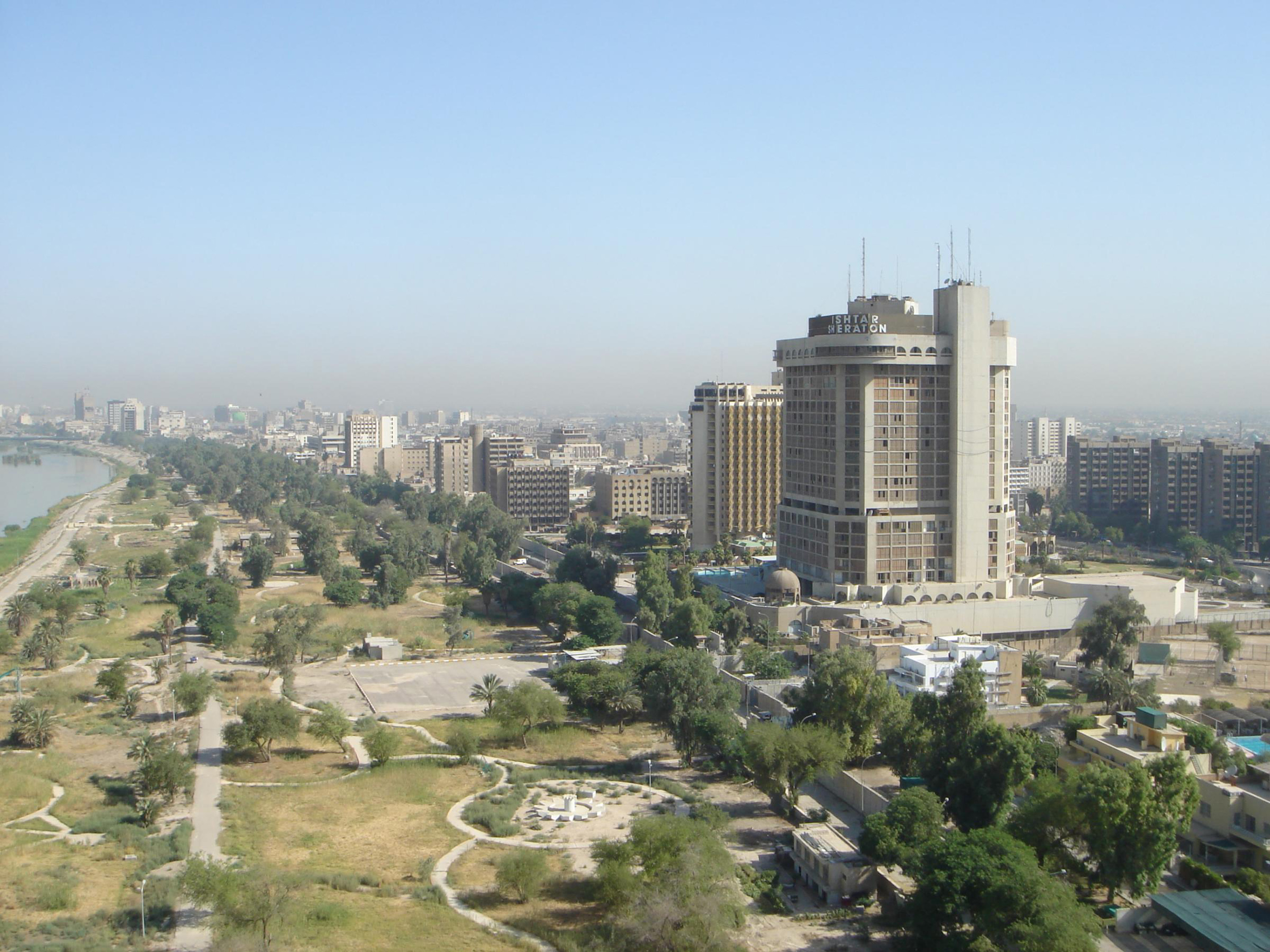
- Capital city Baghdad is the economic centre of Iraq
- Currency: Dinar (IQD)
- Fiscal year: Calendar year
- Trade organisations: OPEC
- Country group: Developing/Emerging; Upper-middle income economy

Statistics
- Population: ▲46,418,421 (2024)
- GDP: ▲$264.78 billion (Nominal, 2026); ▲$739.13 billion (PPP, 2026)
- GDP rank: 54th (nominal, 2026); 48th (PPP, 2026)
- GDP growth: 0.5% (2025f)
- GDP per capita: ▲$5,677 (2025); ▲$14,464 (PPP, 2025 est.)
- GDP per capita rank: 116th (nominal, 2025); 113th (PPP, 2025)
- GDP per capita growth: -4.2% (2025)
- GDP by sector: agriculture: 2.8%; industry: 55.6%; services: 42.3%; (2023 est.)
- Inflation (CPI): 1.2% (2024)
- Population below national poverty line: 1.82% (2024); 15% on less than $9.50/day (2024)
- Gini coefficient: 29.8 low (2023)
- Human Development Index: ▲0.712 high (2024) (105th); 0.687 IHDI (2022)
- Labour force: ▲11,744,262 (2023); ▼33.2% employment rate (2021)
- Labour force by occupation: agriculture: 22.6%; industry: 28.7%; services: 50.8%; (2008 est.)
- Unemployment: ▼13% (2025)
- Youth unemployment: ▲32% (2025)
- Informal employment: 67.6% (2021)
- Main industries: petroleum, chemicals, textiles, leather, construction materials, food processing, fertilizer, metal fabrication/processing

External
- Exports: ▲$42.07 billion (2025)
- Export goods: crude oil 92%, crude materials excluding fuels, food and live animals
- Main export partners: China 35%; India 27.3%; South Korea 8.2%; United States 7%; Greece 4.9%; Netherlands 3.8%; Italy 2.4%; France 1.9%; Germany 1.6%; Turkey 1.6% (2024)
- Imports: ▲$51.7 billion (2024 est.)
- Import goods: food, medicine, manufactures
- Main import partners: China 30.85%; Turkey 25.10%; India 6.29%; Brazil 3.68%; Saudi Arabia 3.34%; United States 3.07%; Germany 2.72%; South Korea 2.41%; Thailand 2.23%; Italy 2% (2024)
- FDI stock: ▲$112.233 billion (2023 est.); ▲ Abroad: $122.109 billion (2015 est.)
- Current account: ▲$158.01 billion (2022)
- Gross external debt: ▼$23.065 billion (2022)

Public finance
- Government debt: ▼45.9% of GDP (2024)
- Foreign reserves: ▲$415 billion (February 2023) (24th)
- Budget balance: +6.056% (of GDP) (2021 est.)
- Revenue: 68.71 billion (2017)
- Spending: 76.82 billion (2017)
- Credit rating: B− (Fitch, January 2022)
- All values, unless otherwise stated, are in US dollars.

Iraq has a developing, upper-middle income economy, dominated by the oil sector. The IFAD has classified Iraq as an oil-rich upper middle income country. In 2025, the economy is estimated to be at $690 billion (GDP PPP), ranking it as the 5th largest in the Arab world, 7th in the Middle East and North Africa and 51st largest economy in the world. In terms of gold reserves, Iraq is among the top five Arab countries, and holds the 30th position globally.

Economic growth began in the 1970s. The oil industry was nationalized in 1972, followed by a sharp increase in the price of petroleum. Revenue generated from the petroleum sector were utilized in development projects and expanding social services, which turned Iraq into a highly developed country. Although the Iran–Iraq War led to the damage of infrastructure, Iraq remained economically stable. However, the Gulf War in 1991 and subsequent sanctions drained Iraq's economy. An oil-for-food program by the United Nations allowed Iraq to sell oil in exchange for humanitarian goods for the civilian population. With resumed trade ties and government reconstruction efforts, Iraq experienced gradual economic recovery.

However, the invasion of Iraq in 2003 and the subsequent war damaged much of the country's infrastructure and social services. Iraq's economy expanded rapidly due to privatization. Since 2022, under the leadership of the prime minister Muhammad Shayya al-Sudani, Iraq has seen a period of economic stability.

Iraq is traditionally an oil-rich state, with the oil industry being the dominant sector. In 2024, it provided 89% of foreign exchange earnings. Crude oil accounts for 92-99% of Iraq's total exports and 90% of the state budget. Since the 2003 invasion, Iraqi oil revenue is controlled by the United States government, which uses it for political leverage in the country.

Other exports include fruits, aluminum and dates, while import goods include foods, medicine and manufactured products such as ships, automobiles and consumer electronics. Major trade partners of Iraq are the United States, China, India, Greece, Turkey and the United Arab Emirates. Iraq has strong economic and trade ties with numerous countries, with large investments from China and Saudi Arabia.

== History ==
=== Monarchy ===
In the early monarchy era, economic institutions developed slowly. The Iraqi economy was largely market-oriented, but based more on feudal and traditions rather than on modern principles. King Faisal, the first king of Iraq, laid foundations for the modern Iraqi state. Under his rule, an oil pipeline was built between Kirkuk and Haifa. Then finance minister Sassoon Eskell was instrumental in forming Iraq's financial system and oil industry.

A development board was established in 1950. The board regulated five-year plans that emphasized three priorities—agriculture, transportation and communication and construction. The agriculture part also included irrigation and flood control. The board was well-received by the commentators for using most of the country's oil income for capital investment and infrastructure development. It also received criticism for over-emphasizing agriculture and ignoring industry and human resources, which would have appealed to two increasingly important constituents—educated elites and workers. Neglecting these groups became one of the minor reasons which provoked the coup in 1958.

=== Economic growth and downturn ===
During its modern history, the oil sector has provided about 99.7% of foreign exchange earnings. The agrarian economy underwent rapid development following the 14 July Revolution in 1958. It had become the third-largest economy in the Middle East by 1980. This occurred in part because of the industrialization and infrastructure development initiatives led by Saddam Hussein, which included irrigation projects, railway and highway construction, and rural electrification. The economy was dominated by the state, with strict bureaucratic controls and centralized planning. This era of expansion led former U.S. State Department official William R. Polk to refer to the period as a “golden age,” noting that “schools, universities, hospitals, factories, theaters and museums proliferated; employment became so universal that a labor shortage developed.” In the 1980s, financial problems caused by massive expenditures in the Iran–Iraq War and damage to oil export facilities by Iran's military led the government to implement austerity measures, to borrow heavily, and to later reschedule foreign debt payments.

Nominal GDP grew by 213% in the 1960s, 1325% in the 1970s, 2% in the 1980s, −47% in the 1990s, and 317% in 2000s. Real GDP per capita (measured in $1990) increased significantly during the 1950s, 60s and 70s, which can be explained by both higher oil production levels as well as oil prices, which famously peaked in the 1970s due to the OPEC's oil embargo, causing the 1973 oil crisis. In the following two decades, however, GDP per capita in Iraq dropped substantially because of multiple wars, namely the 1980-88 war with Iran, the 1990-1991 Gulf War.

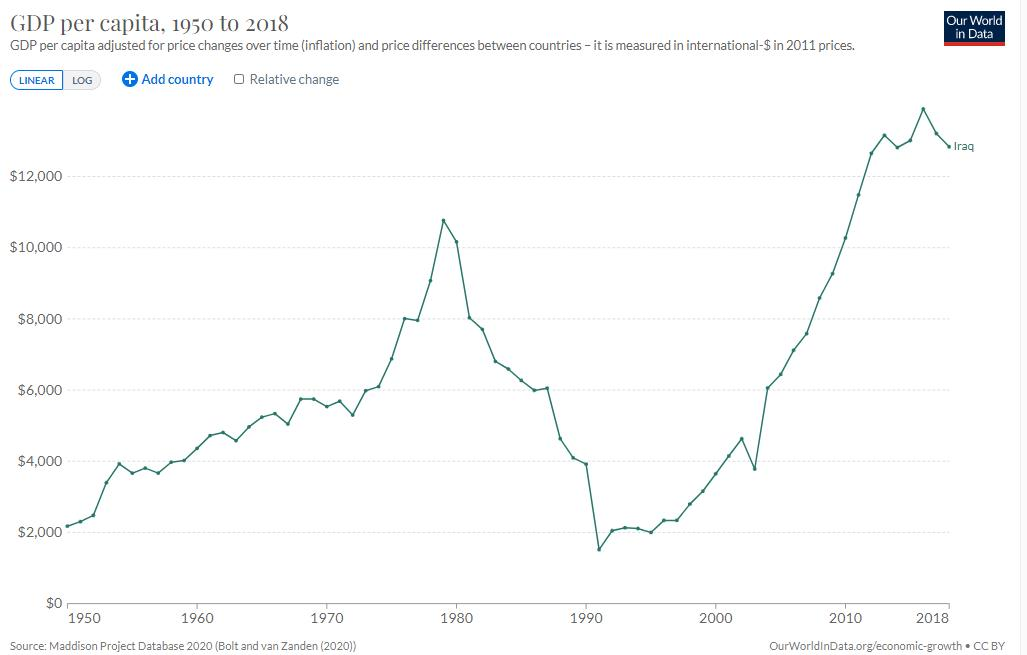
Historical GDP per capita development

Before the outbreak of the war with Iran in September 1980, the economic outlook was positive. In 1979, oil production reached a level of 560,000 m³ (3.5 million barrels) per day, and oil revenues were 21 billion dollars in 1979 and $27 billion in 1980 due to record oil prices. Iraq had amassed an estimated $35 billion in foreign exchange reserves. It was believed to have one of the best education and health care systems in the Middle East, and thousands of migrant workers from Egypt, Somalia, and the Indian subcontinent were employed in construction projects.

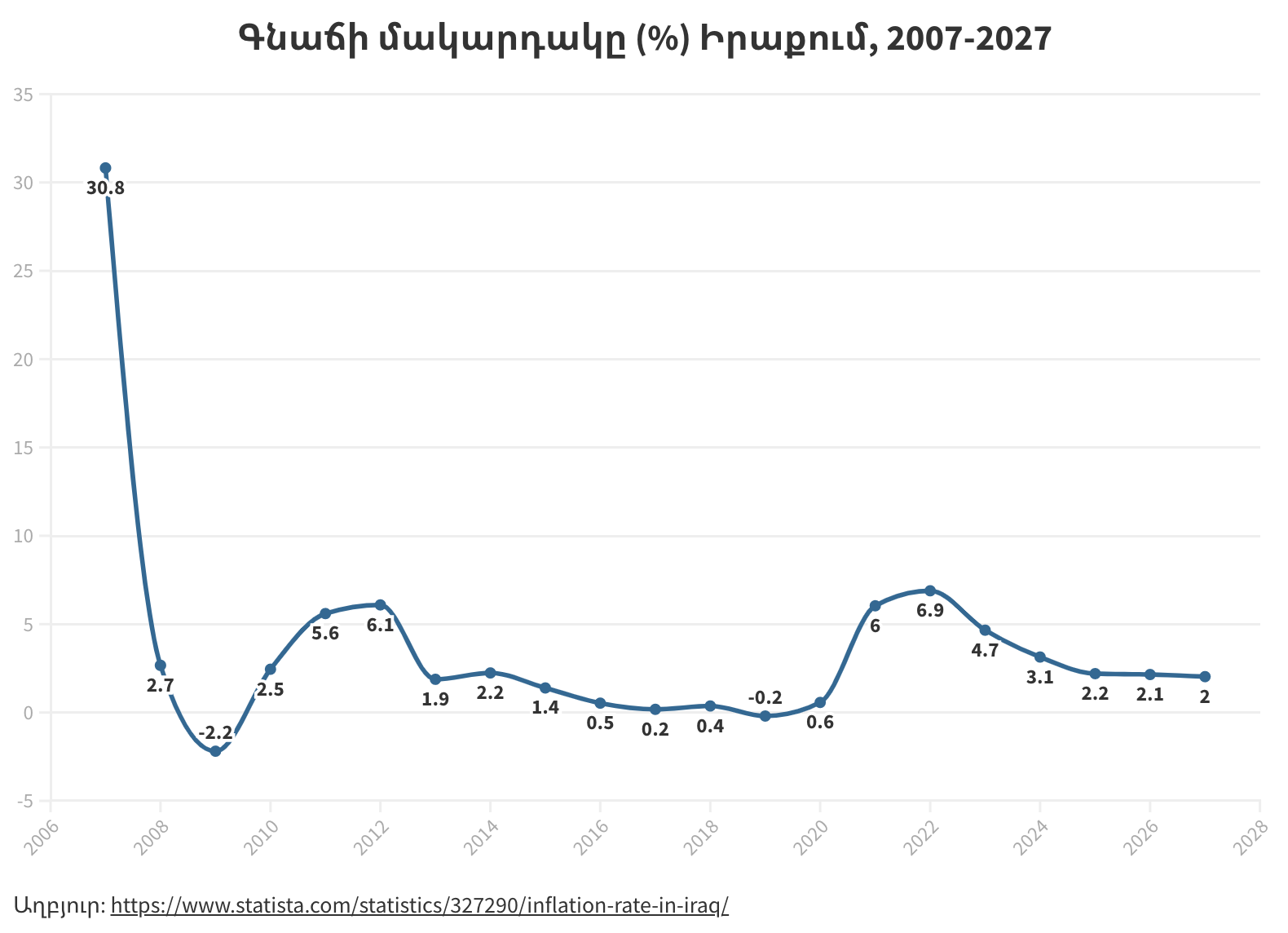
Inflation rate in Iraq (HY)

The Iran–Iraq War and the 1980s oil glut depleted Iraq's foreign exchange reserves, devastated its economy and left the country with a foreign debt of more than $40 billion. Iraq suffered economic losses of at least $80 billion from the war. In 1988, the hostilities ended. Oil exports gradually increased with the construction of new pipelines and restoration of damaged facilities, but again underwent a sharp decline after the Persian Gulf War. Between 1987 and 1990, the economy liberalized somewhat in an attempt to encourage private investment, particularly in small industrial and commercial enterprises, and to privatize unprofitable public assets. After the invasion of Kuwait, the privatization policy died out, though private enterprise continued in the form of small- and medium-sized businesses and light industries.

A U.S government report in June 2003 stated:

In the 1980s, Iraq had one of the Arab world's most advanced economies. Though buffeted by the strains of the Iran–Iraq War, it had – besides petroleum – a considerable industrial sector, a relatively well-developed transport system, and comparatively good infrastructure. Iraq had a relatively large middle class, per capita income levels comparable to Venezuela, Trinidad or Korea, one of the best educational systems in the Arab world, a well educated population and generally good standards of medical care.

=== Sanctions ===
Iraq's seizure of Kuwait in August 1990, subsequent international economic sanctions on Iraq, and damage from military action by the international coalition beginning in January 1991, drastically reduced economic activity. The regime exacerbated shortages by supporting large military and internal security forces and by allocating resources to key supporters of the ruling Party. GDP dropped to one-fourth of the country's 1980 GDP and continued to decline under the postwar international sanctions, until receiving aid from the U.N. Oil-for-Food Programme in 1997.

The implementation of the UN's Oil for Food program in December 1996 helped improve economic conditions. For the first six six-month phases of the program, Iraq was allowed to export increasing amounts of oil in exchange for food, medicine, and other humanitarian goods. In December 1999, the UN Security Council authorized Iraq to export as much oil as required to meet humanitarian needs. Per capita, food imports increased substantially, while medical supplies and health care services steadily improved, though per capita economic production and living standards were still well below their prewar level.

Iraq changed its oil reserve currency from the U.S. dollar to the euro in 2000. However, 28% of Iraq's export revenues under the program were deducted to meet UN Compensation Fund and UN administrative expenses. The drop in GDP in 2001 was largely the result of the global economic slowdown and lower oil prices.

Iraq experienced a modest growth by 2000, when the government attempted to make improvements and reorganizations in the economic system. Oil exports gradually increased as new pipelines were constructed and damaged facilities were restored.

=== After the invasion of Iraq in 2003 ===
The removal of sanctions on 24 May 2003 and rising oil prices in the mid-to-late 2000s led to a doubling in oil production from a low of 1.3 mbpd during the turbulence of 2003 to a high of 2.6 mbpd in 2011. Furthermore, reduced inflation and violence since 2007 have translated to real increases in living standards for Iraqis. One of the key economic challenges was Iraq's immense foreign debt, estimated at $130 billion. Although some of this debt was derived from normal export contracts that Iraq had failed to pay for, some was a result of military and financial support during Iraq's war with Iran.

The Coalition Provisional Authority made efforts to modernize the economy after the 2003 U.S.-led invasion, through privatization and reducing the country's foreign debt. As a result Iraq's economy expanded rapidly during this time, though growth was stunted by the insurgency, civil war, economic mismanagement, and oil shortages caused by outdated technology. Since mid-2009, oil export earnings have returned to levels seen before Operation New Dawn. Government revenues rebounded, along with global oil prices. In 2011, Iraq increased oil exports above their then-current level of 1,900,000 bbl (300,000 m^{3}) per day as a result of new contracts with international oil companies. The export was thought likely to fall short of the 2,400,000 barrels (380,000 m^{3}) per day forecasting in the budget. Iraq's contracts with major oil companies had the potential to greatly expand oil revenues, but Iraq needed to upgrade its oil processing, pipeline, and export infrastructure to enable these deals to reach their potential.

An improved security environment and an initial wave of foreign investment helped to spur economic activity, particularly in the energy, construction, and retail sectors. Broader economic improvement, long-term fiscal health, and sustained increases in the standard of living still depended on the government passing major policy reforms and the continued development of Iraq's massive oil reserves. Although foreign investors viewed Iraq with increasing interest in 2010, most were still hampered by difficulties acquiring land for projects and other regulatory impediments.

The Jubilee Iraq campaign argued that much of these debts were odious (illegitimate). However, as the concept of odious debt is not accepted, trying to deal with the debt on those terms would have embroiled Iraq in legal disputes for years. Iraq decided to deal with its debt more pragmatically and approached the Paris Club of official creditors.

In a December 2006 Newsweek International article, a study by Global Insight in London was reported to show "that Civil war or not, Iraq has an economy, and—mother of all surprises—it's doing remarkably well. Real estate is booming. Construction, retail and wholesale trade sectors are healthy, too, according to [the report]. The U.S. Chamber of Commerce reports 34,000 registered companies in Iraq, up from 8,000 three years ago. Sales of secondhand cars, televisions and mobile phones have all risen sharply. Estimates vary, but one from Global Insight puts GDP growth at 17 per cent last year and projects 13 per cent for 2006. The World Bank has it lower: at 4 per cent this year. But, given all the attention paid to deteriorating security, the startling fact is that Iraq is growing at all."

=== ISIL insurgency ===
In 2014, ISIL seized control of major northern hubs such as Mosul, captured large swathes of agricultural land, cement plants and oil assets and extracted hundreds of millions through local taxation, extortion and illicit oil sales. Concurrently, global oil prices collapsed, cutting state revenues that were needed to fund an expensive military campaign to defeat the insurgents. Over 4.3 million people were internally displaced, driving local poverty rates in occupied and frontline governorates above 40 percent and destroying nearly 800,000 jobs. By late 2017, following the territorial defeat of ISIL, the economy began a slow stabilization path, heavily dependent on international reconstruction projects and an uptick in oil prices.

=== COVID-19 pandemic ===
Iraq's economy contracted by nearly 10% in 2020 due to a severe "triple shocks" resulting from the COVID-19 pandemic, a historic collapse in global oil prices and intense domestic political instability. As a nation whereby the oil sector accounts for over 90% of government revenue and 55% of total Gross Domestic Product (GDP), the global lockdown directly choked Iraq's primary financial lifeline. The World Bank estimated that the economic shocks threatened to push up to 5.5 million more Iraqis below the poverty line.

== Primary sectors ==
=== Agriculture ===
Agriculture contributes just 3.3% to the gross national product but employs a fifth of the labor force.

Historically, 50 to 60 per cent of Iraq's arable land was under cultivation. The Agrarian Reform Law of 1970 was enacted by the Ba'ath Party to reduce ownership limits, removed land control from traditional rural elites and redistributed agricultural property to peasant families and cooperatives. The Baʿathist government initially encouraged public ownership and established agricultural cooperatives and collective farms, but in 1981, the government abolished its collective farming program due to inefficiencies. After 1983, the government privatized state-owned land, with no limit on the size of holdings, and from 1987, sold or leased all state farms.

The main crops grown in Iraq are barley, wheat, rice, vegetables, corn (maize), millet, sugarcane, sugar beets, oil seeds, fruit, fodder, tobacco and cotton. Yields vary considerably from year to year, especially in areas of rain-fed cultivation. Date palm production was seriously damaged during the numerous wars and only returned to pre-war levels in the early 21st century. Animal husbandry are widely practiced, particularly among the Kurds in the northeast, and livestock products, notably milk, meat, hides, and wool, are vital to the agricultural sector.

Under the UN Oil for Food program, Iraq imported large quantities of grains, meat, poultry, and dairy products. During the Gulf War, Iraqi agriculture was disrupted physically and suffered from economic sanctions imposed by the United Nations. Imports were curtailed, petroleum exports were cut off and agricultural production with potential military application was halted. The Iraqi government responded by monopolizing grain and oilseed marketing, imposing production quotas, and instituting a Public Distribution System for basic foodstuffs. By mid-1991, the government supplied a "basket" of foodstuffs that provided about one-third of the caloric daily requirement and cost consumers about five percent of its market value. With subsidies for agricultural inputs diminished, the government's prices failed to cover their costs. Tax on agricultural production reached 20 to 35 percent by the mid-1990s. In October 1991 the Baghdad regime withdrew personnel from the northern region controlled by two Kurdish parties. Kurdistan Region was described as "... a market economy essentially left alone by a fragile governing structure, but heavily influenced by substantial international humanitarian aid flows."

In December 1996, under an "Oil for Food Program" negotiated with the United Nations, Iraq started exporting petroleum and used the proceeds to import foodstuffs. Grain imports averaged $828 million from 1997 to 2001, an increase of over 180 percent from the previous five-year period. Due to foreign competition, Iraqi production declined (29 percent for wheat, 31 percent for barley, and 52 percent for maize). Because the government had neglected the production of forage crops, fruits, vegetables, and livestock other than poultry, those sectors were less buffeted by international affairs. Nevertheless, they were affected by severe drought, an outbreak of screwworm, and an epizootic of foot-and-mouth disease As the Oil for Food Program expanded to cover more agricultural inputs and machinery, the productivity of Iraqi agriculture stabilized around 2002.

After the U.S. invasion in March 2003, many Iraqis became dependent on government-subsidized food. The US-funded agricultural reconstruction program thus focused on increased productivity under the aegis of Agricultural Reconstruction and Development Iraq (ARDI). Another program was run by Development Alternatives, Inc. (DAI) of Bethesda, Maryland. The restoration of Iraq's irrigation systems was largely funded by Bechtel International.

ARDI conducted trials to improve farming practices and crop varieties of winter cereals (wheat and barley), summer cereals (rice, maize, and sorghum), potatoes, and tomatoes. Feed supplements and veterinary treatments were introduced to increase ovulation, conception, and birth weights of livestock. Surveys were conducted of poultry growers and apple farmers. Nurseries were established for date palms and grapes. ARDI had projects promoting trade associations and producers' co-ops and supported extension as an appropriate governmental function. The contract eventually cost over $100 million and lasted through December 2006. Under its Community Action Program, USAID also funded an analysis of markets for sheep and wool. It awarded a contract to the University of Hawaii to revitalize higher education in agriculture. It awarded a contract for $120 million to the Louis Berger Group to promote Iraq's private sector, including agriculture.

Starting in 2006, Provincial Reconstruction Teams were sent in to promote goodwill and sap the insurgency. "PRTs" allowed military commanders to identify local needs and, with few bureaucratic hurdles, to dispense up to $500,000. Civilians from many agencies within the U.S. Department of Agriculture, as well as USAID, served tours on PRTs. Some participants criticized the absence of a national agricultural strategy, or clear direction on the design of projects. Others complained that projects emphasized "American-style, 21st-century agricultural technologies and methodologies..." that were inappropriate for Iraq.

Agricultural production did not rebound from the reconstruction program. According to the Food and Agriculture Organization (FAO), between 2002 and 2013, the production of wheat increased 11 percent and milled rice 8 percent, but barley had decreased 13 percent and maize 40 percent. Scaled in "international dollars" (2004-2006 base equaling 100) Iraq's per capita food production was 135 in 2002, 96 in 2007, and 94 in 2012. The agricultural sector shed workers. In those same years, production per worker was 117, 106, and 130, respectively.

The international Oil-for-Food program (1997–2003) further reduced farm production by supplying artificially priced foreign foodstuffs. Because of favorable weather conditions, grain production was 22 percent higher than in 2002. Although growth continued in 2004, experts predicted that Iraq would be an importer of agricultural products for the foreseeable future. Long-term plans call for investment in agricultural machinery and materials and more prolific crop varieties—improvements that did not reach Iraq's farmers under the Hussein regime. In 2004, the main crops were wheat, barley, corn, rice, vegetables, dates, and cotton, and the main livestock outputs were cattle and sheep.

The Agricultural Cooperative Bank, capitalized at nearly 1 G$ - by 1984, targets its low-interest, low-collateral loans to private farmers for mechanization, poultry projects, and orchard development. Large modern cattle, dairy, and poultry farms are under construction. Obstacles to agricultural development include labor shortages, inadequate management and maintenance, salinization, urban migration, and dislocations resulting from previous land reform and collectivization programs.

In 2011, an agricultural adviser to the Iraqi government, Layth Mahdi, summarized the forced United States agricultural reconstruction:

Before 2003, Iraq had imported about 30 per cent of its food needs annually. The decline in agricultural production after this period, created the need for importing 90 per cent of the food at a cost estimated at more than $12 billion annually. Due to the sudden shift in the agricultural policy from subsidized assistance to an immediate shift to a free market policy, the outcomes led to a decline in production. The observed outcome resulted in many farmers abandoning the land and agriculture. The impact on natural resources results in an exploited and degraded environment leaving the land destitute and the people impoverished, unemployed [and] experiencing a sense of losing their human dignity.

Importation of foreign workers and increased entry of women into traditionally male labour roles have helped compensate for agricultural and industrial labour shortages exacerbated by the war. A disastrous attempt to drain the southern marshes and introduce irrigated farming to this region merely destroyed a natural food producing area, while concentration of salts and minerals in the soil due to the draining left the land unsuitable for agriculture.

In the Mada'in Qada region east of Baghdad, hundreds of small farmers united to form the Green Mada'in Association for Agricultural Development, an agricultural cooperative that provides its members with drip irrigation and greenhouses as well as access to credit.

In recent years, farmers have been confronted with reduced rainfall and high temperatures. Particularly affected are small scale farmers who, unable to withstand lower water levels, are forced to leave their lands in search of different ways to fulfill their livelihoods.

=== Forestry, fishing, and mining ===
Throughout the twentieth century, human exploration, shifting agriculture, forest fires, and uncontrolled grazing denuded large areas of Iraq's natural forests, which in 2005 were almost exclusively confined to the northeastern highlands. Most of the trees found in that region are not suitable for lumbering. In 2002, a total of 112,000 cubic meters of wood were harvested, nearly half of which was used as fuel.

Despite its notable large rivers, Iraq's fishing industry has remained relatively small and based largely on marine species in the Persian Gulf. In 2001, the approximate yield was 8,000 tons (compared to 18,000/t during the period between 1981-1997) according to official government estimates.

Aside from hydrocarbons, Iraq's mining industry has been confined to extraction of relatively small amounts of phosphates (at Akashat), salt, and sulfur (near Mosul). Since a productive period in the 1970s, the mining industry has been hampered by the Iran–Iraq War (1980–88), the sanctions of the 1990s, and the economic collapse of 2003.

=== Energy ===
==== Oil and gas ====
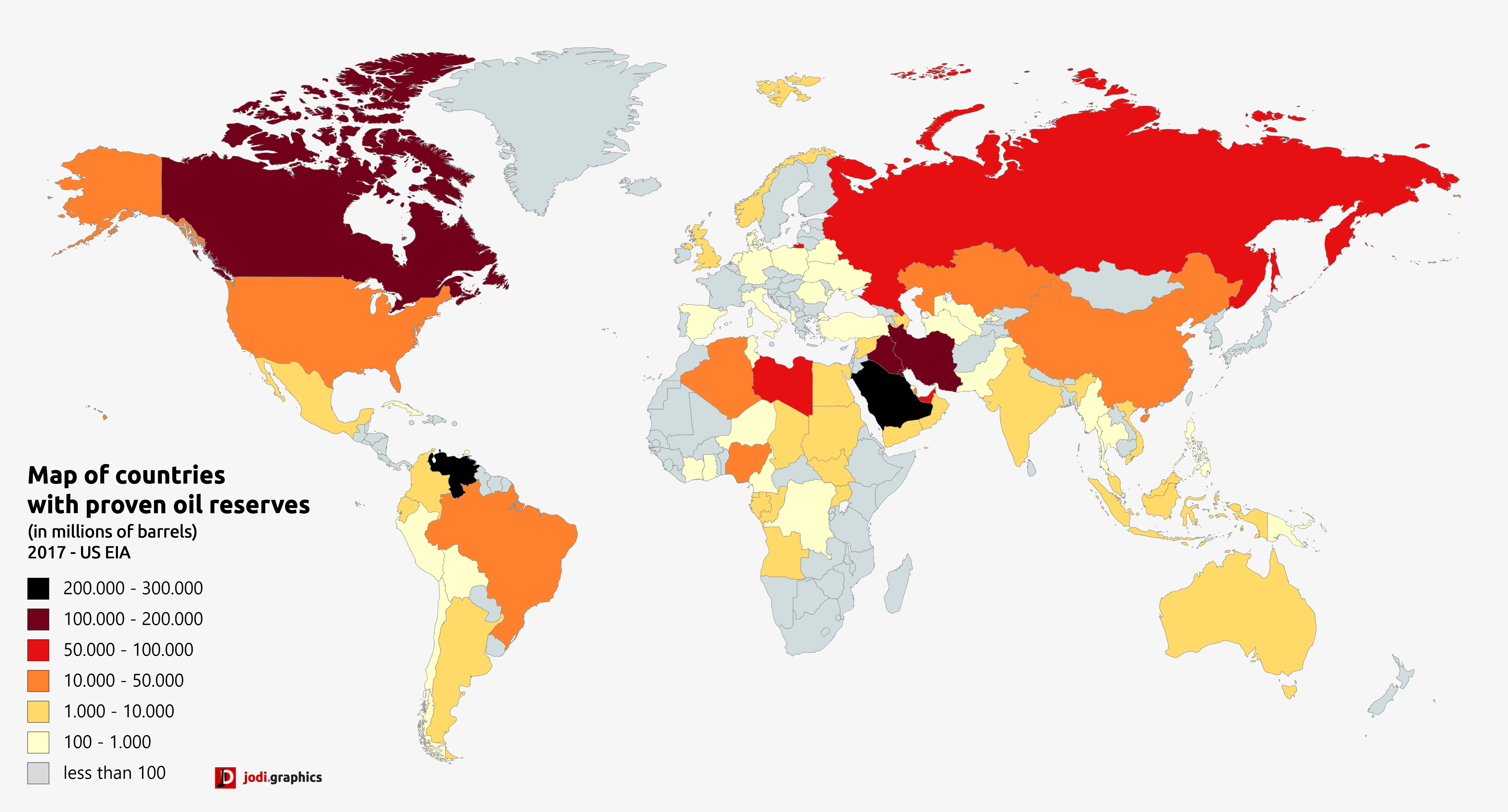
A map of world oil reserves according to U.S. EIA, 2017

Iraq is one of the most oil-rich countries in the world. The country holding the fifth largest proven crude oil reserves, totaling 147.22 billion barrels at the end of 2017. Most of this oil—4 million barrels per day out of 4.3 million barrels produced daily—is exported, making Iraq the third-largest exporter of oil. Despite its ongoing civil war, Iraq was able to increase oil production during 2015 and 2016, with production dipping by 3.5 per cent in 2017 due to conflict with the Kurdistan Regional Government and OPEC production limits. By world standards, production costs for Iraqi oil are relatively low. However, four wars—the 1980–1988 Iraq-Iran War, 1991 Gulf War, the 2003–2011 War in Iraq, and the civil war—and the 1991–2003 UN sanctions have left the industry's infrastructure in poor condition.

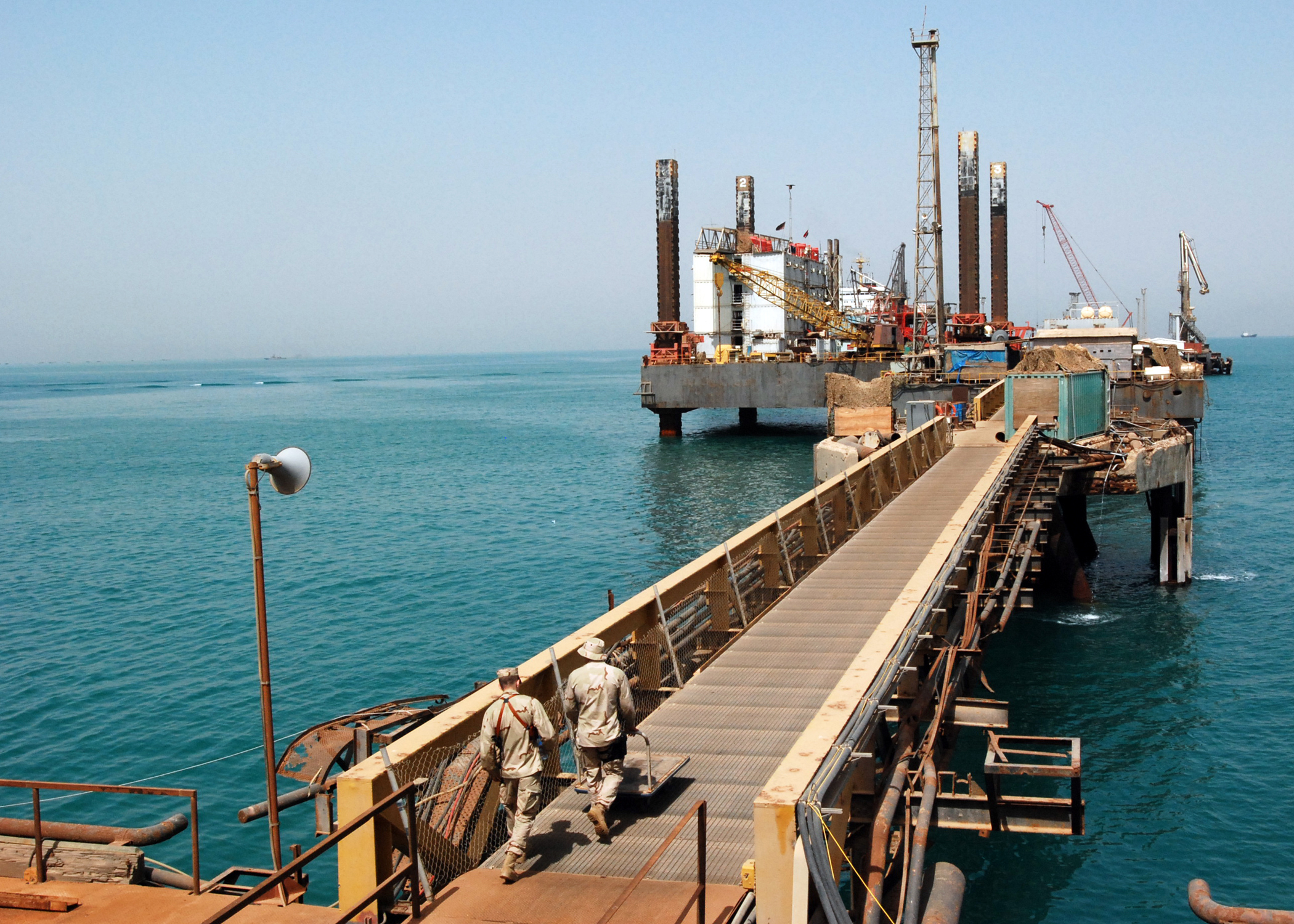
Khawr Al Amaya Oil Platform in Basra Governorate

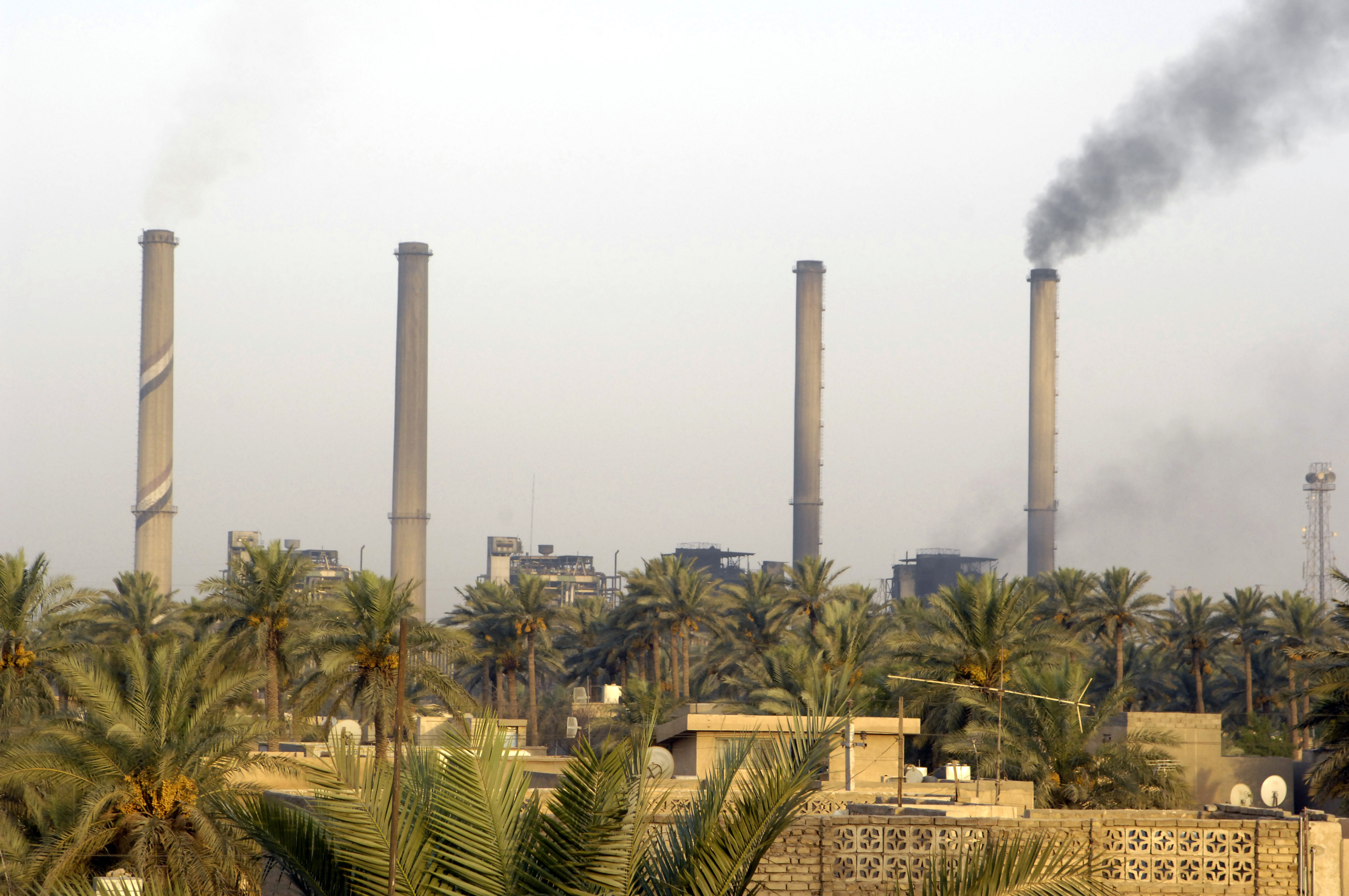
Power plant and oil refinery in Dora neighborhood in Baghdad

In the 1970s, Iraq produced over 3.5 million barrels of oil per day. Production began to fall during the Iran-Iraq War, before plummeting 85 per cent after the 1991 invasion of Kuwait. UN sanctions prevented the export of oil until 1996, and then allowed exports only in exchange for humanitarian aid in the Oil-for-Food Programme.

The 2003 lifting of sanctions enabled production and exports to restart. Production has since recovered to pre-Gulf War levels, and most of Iraq's oil infrastructure has been repaired, despite persistent sabotage by the Islamic State (ISIL) and others. In 2004, Iraq had eight oil refineries, the largest of which were at Baiji, Basra, and Daura.

Despite its oil wealth, sabotage and technical problems at refineries have forced Iraq to import petroleum, other refined oil products, and electricity from the neighbouring countries, especially Iran. In 2004, for example, Iraq spent $60 million per month for imported gasoline.

In late 2004 and early 2005, regular sabotage of plants and pipelines reduced export and domestic distribution of oil, particularly to Baghdad. Nationwide fuel shortages and power outages resulted. Persistent ISIL sabotage of pipelines, power plants and power lines, and theft of oil and electricity have also contributed to the July 2018 protests in southern Iraq.

Iraq holds the 12th largest natural gas reserves globally at roughly 131 trillion cubic feet. In 2004, plans called for increased domestic utilization of natural gas to replace oil and for use in the petrochemical industry. However, because most of Iraq's gas output is associated with oil, output growth depends on developments in the oil industry.

Half of Iraq's power plants were destroyed in the Persian Gulf War of 1991, and full recovery never occurred. In mid-2004, Iraq had an estimated 5,000 megawatts of power-generating capacity, compared with 7,500 megawatts of demand. At that time, the transmission system included 17,700 kilometers of line. In 2004, plans called for construction of two new power plants and restoration of existing plants and transmission lines to ease the blackouts and economic hardship caused by this shortfall, but sabotage and looting kept capacity below 6,000 megawatts. The ongoing civil war, sabotage of transmission lines, and government corruption caused the electricity shortage to worsen: by 2010 demand outstripped supply by 6000 megawatts.

Oil continues to dominate Iraq's economy. As of 2018, oil is responsible for over 65% of GDP and 90% of total government revenue. Petroleum constitutes 94% of Iraq's exports with a value of $59.73 billion in 2017. The central government hopes to diversify the economy away from oil, and has had some success: non-oil GDP growth, which was below the regional average from 2014 to 2016, pushed above the average in 2017. Despite this, the percentage of government spending going to non-oil investment has continued to decline since 2013 and now stands at only 34 per cent.

Since its 2003 invasion, the US exerts significant control on Iraqi oil income because it is collected at an account of the Central Bank of Iraq at the Federal Reserve Bank of New York. Physical dollars are sent to Iraq by plane. On several occasions, the US has used the threat of cutting access to the funds to force policy changes from Iraq. Supporters of this system have argued it provides financial stability and security for Iraq's oil revenue.

===== 2009 oil services contracts =====
Between June 2009 and February 2010 the Ministry of Oil tendered for the award of Service Contracts to develop Iraq's existing oil fields. The results of the tender, which were broadcast live on Iraqi television, are as follows for all major fields awarded but excluding the Kurdistan Region where Production Sharing Contracts have been awarded that are currently being disputed by the Baghdad government. All contracts are awaiting final ratification of the awards by the Iraqi government. Company shares are subject to change as a result of commercial negotiations between parties.

Field	Company	Home country	Company type	Share in field	Production increase share	Service fee per bbl	Gross revenue at plateau - US bn p.a.	References
Majnoon	Shell	Netherlands	Public	45%	0.7875	1.39	0.4	BBC
Majnoon	Petronas	Malaysia	State	30%	0.525	1.39	0.266	Shell
Halfaya	CNPC	China	State	37.5%	0.525	1.39	0.102	Upstream
Halfaya	Petronas	Malaysia	State	18.75%	0.099	1.4	0.051	Upstream
Halfaya	TotalEnergies	France	Public	18.75%	0.099	1.39	0.051	
Rumaila	BP	United Kingdom	Public	37.5%	0.7125	2	0.520	Business Week
Rumaila	CNPC	China	State	37.5%	0.7125	1.39	0.520	
Zubair	ENI	Italy	Public	32.81%	0.328	2	0.240	Business Week
Zubair	Occidental	United States	Public	23.44%	0.2344	2	0.171	Business Week
Zubair	KOGAS	Korea	State	18.75%	0.1875	2	0.137	Business Week
West Qurna Field Phase 2	Lukoil	Russia	Public	75.00%	1.3500	1.15	0.567	Business Week
West Qurna Field Phase 2	Equinor	Norway	State	n/a	n/a	n/a	n/a	Equinor
Badra	Gazprom	Russia	State	30%	0.051	5.5	0.102	Business Week
Badra	Petronas	Malaysia	State	15%	0.0255	5.5	0.051	Upstream
Badra	KOGAS	Korea	State	23%	0.03825	5.5	0.077	Upstream
Badra	TPAO	Turkey	State	8%	0.01275	5.5	0.026	
West Qurna Field Phase 1	Exxon	US	Public	60%	1.2276	1.9	0.851	Business Week
West Qurna Field Phase 1	Shell	United Kingdom / Netherlands (Note: From 2005 to 2022, Shell had its headquarters in The Hague and its registered office in London. In January 2022, the company moved its headquarters to London.)	Public	15%	0.3069	1.9	0.213	Alfred Donovan's blog (royaldutchshellplc.com)

Notes:

1. Field shares are as a % of the total. The Iraqi state retains a 25% share in all fields for which service contracts have been awarded.
2. Production increase share is the millions of bbls per day that will attract the service fee for the company.
3. Gross revenue at plateau is the total payment each company will receive upon reaching their declared target plateau production rate (in between 5 and 8 years, depending on the field), before deduction of any operating costs, in addition to recovery of all development costs as billions of US dollars per annum. The total gross revenue for all companies, after recovery of capital costs, is at plateau production of an additional 9.4 mb/d, 4.34 bn US per annum, at a $70 bbl oil price. The 2010 Iraq govt budget is $60 billion. $300 billion is approximately $10,000 per annum for each Iraqi citizen.

In summary the shares by region in the increased production are:

Region	Production Share mb/d	% of total
Iraq	1.462	25%
Asia	1.9	20%
UK	1.81	19%
US	1.462	16%
Russia	1.402	14%
Europe (excl UK)	0.528	6%

==== Electricity ====
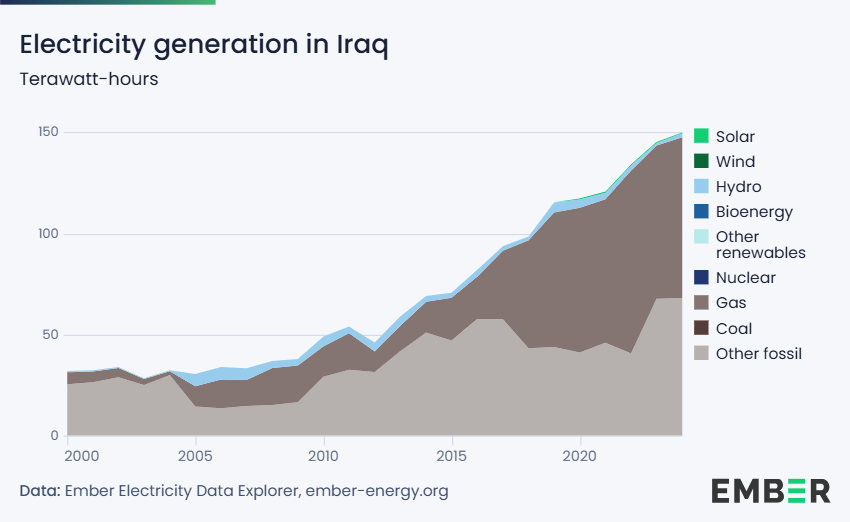
Electricity generation in Iraq in terawatt-hours

Iraq's electricity generation primarily depends on fossil fuels. In 2023, natural gas was the largest source at 52% of the total, followed by oil at 47%. Renewable energy, mainly from hydroelectric power, contributed 1%. As of 2023, the 30 gigawatts (GW) of installed capacity cannot meet summer peak demand. A net 10% of electricity is imported.

In 2021, the majority of Iraq's electricity consumption was attributed to the residential sector, which used 65.0% of the total. This was followed by the commercial and public services sector at 21.6%, and industrial activities at 11.2%. The smallest share was consumed by the agriculture and forestry sector, accounting for only 2.2%.

According to the United States Department of Energy officials, demand for electricity has been stimulated by a growing economy and a surge in consumer purchases of appliances and electronics. In addition, electricity is subsidized in Iraq, which leads to increased demand.

Due to a weak grid and institutional problems many consumers use small generators or rooftop solar panels.

== Industry ==
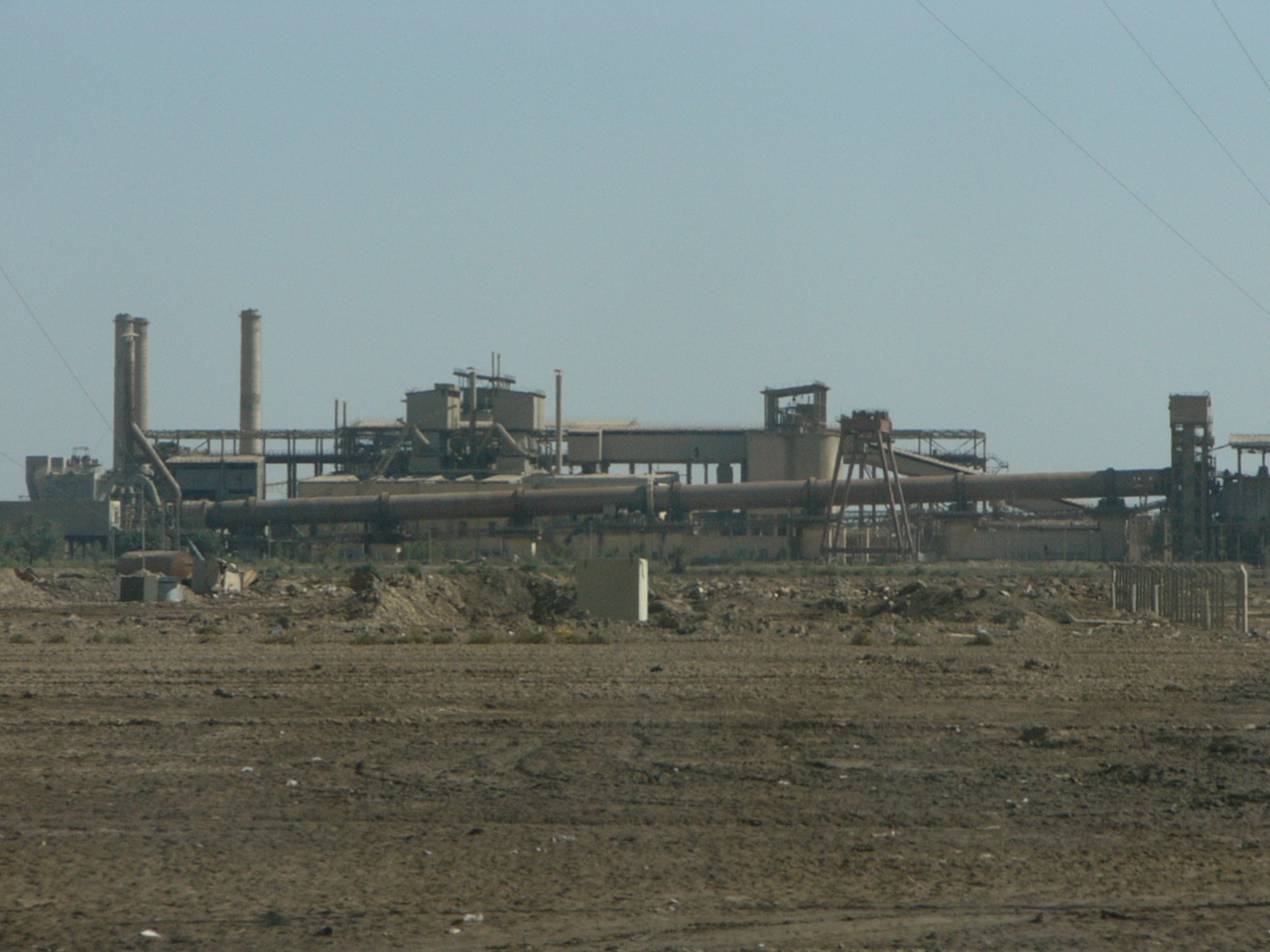
A cement factory in Samawah

Since 1974, after the government took direct control of Iraq's largest private oil production operations, Mosul Oil and Basra Oil, most of Iraq's manufacturing activity has been closely connected to the oil industry. The major industries in that category have been petroleum refining and the manufacture of chemicals and fertilizers. Until the 1980s, most heavy manufacturing was greatly subsidized and made little economic sense, but it brought prestige for the Baʿath regime and during the Iran–Iraq War, served as a basis for the country's massive military industrial base. Iron and steel plants were built at Khor Al Zubair and a wide range of industrial activities were initiated, some of which were boosted by the war, most notably aluminum smelting and the production of tractors, electrical goods, telephone cables and tires.

The combined results of the Iran-Iraq War, the Gulf War and the UN embargo eroded Iraq's manufacturing capacity. Within its first two years, the embargo had cut the country's manufacturing capacity by more than half. After 1997, however, there was an increase in manufacturing output, in both the public and the private sectors, as replacement parts and government credit became available. By the end of the decade, large numbers of products long unavailable to consumers were once again back on the market, and almost all the factories that were operating before the imposition of the embargo had resumed production, albeit at somewhat lower levels.

Before 2003, diversification was hindered by limitations on privatization and the effects of the international sanctions of the 1990s. Since 2003, security problems have blocked efforts to establish new enterprises. The construction industry is an exception; in 2000 cement was the only major industrial product not based on hydrocarbons. The construction industry has profited from the need to rebuild after Iraq's several wars. In the 1990s, the industry benefited from government funding of extensive infrastructure and housing projects and elaborate palace complexes.

=== Automobile ===
Iraq has a growing automotive industry, which is mostly concentrated in Baghdad, Babylon and Erbil. According to the prime minister's economic advisor Mazhar Mohammed Salih, there are 9 million registered vehicles in Iraq. Iraq imports approximately 200,000 cars annually from international companies, most notably Iranian, European, Japanese, Korean, Chinese, and American manufacturers. He has emphasized that the presence of production facilities for international companies in Iraq would reduce the percentage of car imports from abroad by approximately 10%.

Al-Sadeq Group manages numerous automotive manufacturing plants across the country, mostly concentrated around the Babylon governorate. The brands include Chery, FAW Group and Renault Trucks, with an upcoming factory for Bestune. The Chery facility in Iraq covers an area of 30,000 square metres (7.4 acres), manufacture passenger cars having annual production capacity of 30,000 cars and employ 750 people directly and 5,000 people directly. It has also activated separate battery, tire, oil and plastic factory, which would act as ancillaries. Al-Sadeq's factory for FAW Group in the Babylon governorate spread across an area of 11,000 square metres (2.7 acres), manufacturing passenger cars with an annual capacity of 25,000 cars. Al-Sadeq also operates an assembly for Renault Trucks in Iraq, which has an assembling capacity of 10 trucks daily. The group has also planned to construct a new plant for Bestune, which would expand its presence in Iraq and create more opportunities in the region.

== Services ==
=== Finance and banking ===
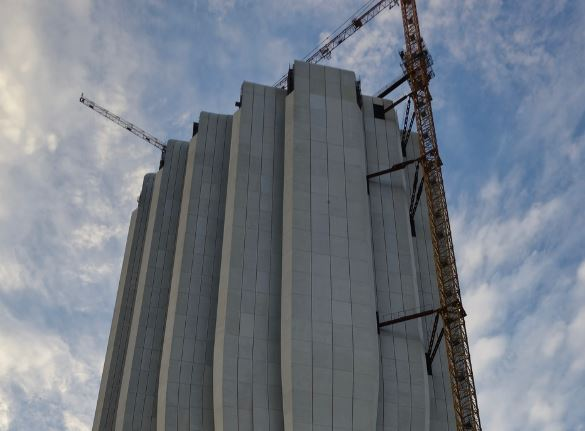
The new headquarters of the Central Bank of Iraq under construction, 2022

Iraq's financial services have been the subject of post-Saddam reforms. The 17 private banks established during the 1990s were limited to domestic transactions and attracted few private depositors. Those banks and two main state banks were badly damaged by the international embargo of the 1990s. To further privatize and expand the system, in 2003 the Coalition Provisional Authority removed restrictions on international bank transactions and freed the Central Bank of Iraq (CBI) from government control. In its first year of independent operation, the CBI received credit for limiting Iraq's inflation. In 2004, three foreign banks (HSBC, Standard Chartered, National Bank of Kuwait) were the first to receive licenses to do business in Iraq.

Modern-style banking in Iraq roots from the beginning of the 20th century.

Iraq's two main state-owned banks are the largest banks in Iraq and have a shared history. In 1988, Rasheed Bank was spun off from Rafidain Bank.

Banking group	Established	Number of Branches	Total Assets (Iraqi Dinar billion)	Share of total banking system assets	Share of total banking system credit	Share of total banking system deposits
Rasheed Bank	1988	162				
Rafidain Bank	1941	147				

=== Education ===
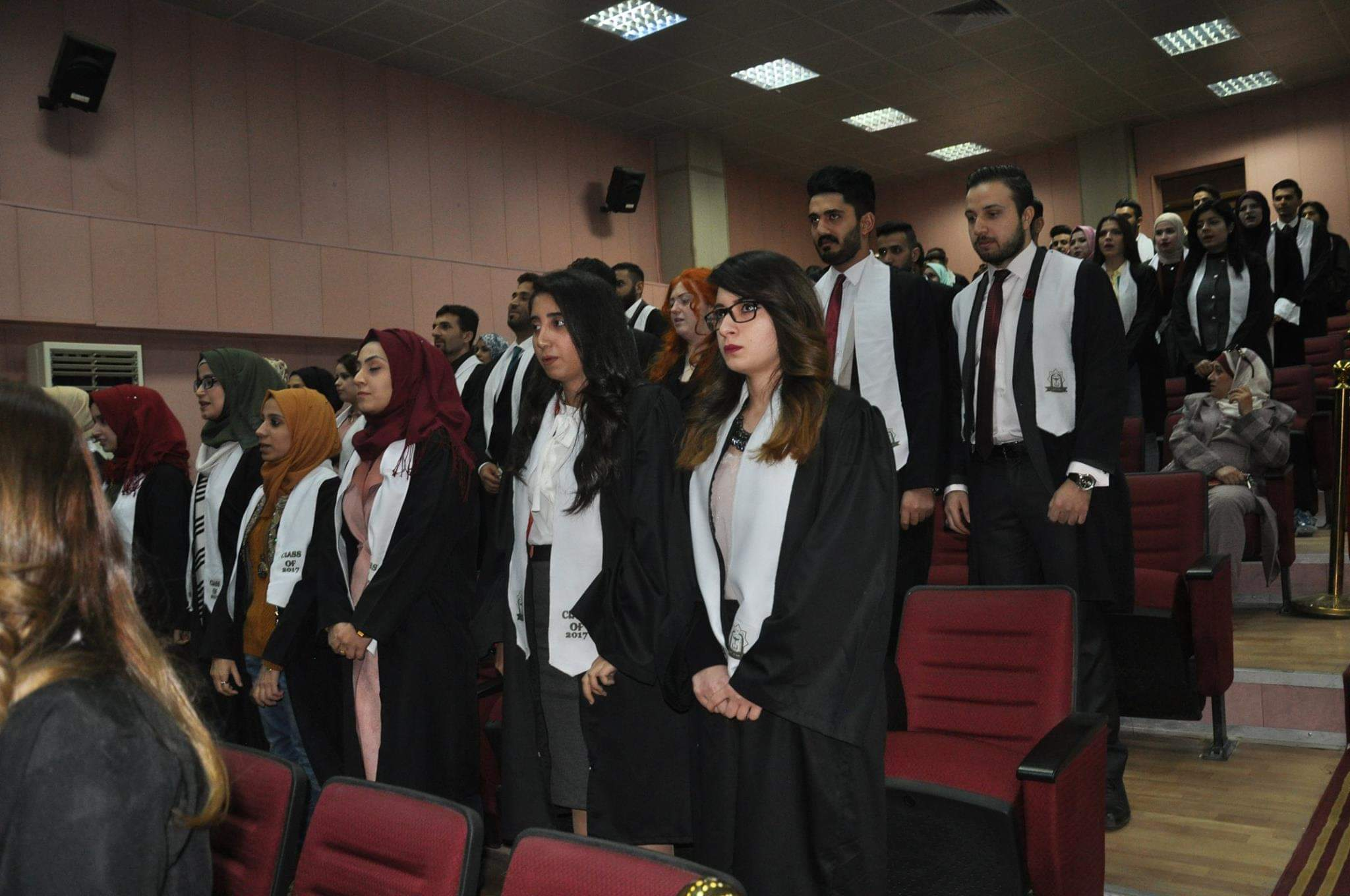
Students at Al-Kindy College of Medicine

Education in Iraq is administered by the Ministry of Education.

UNESCO reports that Iraq previously had one of the best educational performances in the Middle Eastern/West Asian region. In primary school, gross enrollment rate used to be 100%, and literacy levels were high. The illiteracy rate was 20% in 1987. However, education has suffered since the 1980s and especially the 1990s following the Gulf war, International sanctions against Iraq, the American occupation, and general instability in the country.

As of 2018, 92% of children were enrolled in primary school. However, only just over half of low-income children complete primary school, and less than a quarter complete secondary school. According to the Iraqi Ministry of Planning, the literacy rate was 88% in 2024. Each year, the Iraqi Ministry of Higher Education records roughly 50,000 master's and doctoral degrees, the majority of which are awarded to students enrolled in private universities. Iran and Lebanon are often cited as among the countries where obtaining an academic degree is comparatively more accessible.

Before Iraq faced economic sanctions from the UN, it already had an advanced and successful education system. However, it has now been "de-developing" in its educational success. In general, the education of Iraq has been improving since the MDGs were implemented. For example, enrollment numbers nearly doubled from 2000 to 2012. It went from 3.6 to 6 million. The latest statistic from 2015 to 2016 showed that almost 9.2 million children were in school. Enrollment rates continue to be on a steady increase at about 4.1% each year. The sheer increase in numbers shows that there are clearly improvements of children in Iraq having access to education. However, the dramatic increase of the number of students in primary education has had some negative and straining effects for the education system. The budget for education makes up about only 5.7% of government spending and continues to stay at or below this percentage. Investments for schools has also been on the decline. As a result, the country now ranks at the bottom of Middle East countries in terms of education. The little funding for education makes it more difficult to improve the quality and resources for education. At the same time, UNICEF investigated portions of spending for education and found that some of the money has gone to waste. They found that dropout rates are increasing as well as repetition rates for children. In both Iraq Centre and KRI, the rates for dropouts are about 1.5% to 2.5%. While the rate for dropouts for boys was around 16.5%, girls were at 20.1% where it could be due to economic or family reasons. For repetition rates, percentages have almost reached 17% among all students. As a result, almost 20% of the funding for education was lost to dropouts and repetition for the year 2014–2015.

Other statistics show that regional differences can attribute to lower or higher enrollment rates for children in primary education. For example, UNICEF found that areas with conflict like Saladin had "more than 90% of school-age children" not in the education system. In addition, some schools were converted into refugee shelters or military bases in 2014 as conflict began to increase. The resources for education become more strained and make it harder for children to go to school and finish receiving their education. However, in 2017, there were efforts being made to open up 47 schools that had previously been closed. There has been more success in Mosul where over 380,000 are going to school again. Depending on where children live, they may or may not have the same access to education as other children. There are also the differing enrollment rates between boys and girls. UNICEF found that in 2013–2014, enrollment numbers for boys was at about five million while girls were at about 4.2 million. While the out-of-school rate for girls is at about 11%, boys are at less than half of that. However, the rate of enrollments for girls has been increasing at a higher rate than for boys. In 2015–2016, the enrollment numbers for girls increased by 400,000 from the previous year where a large number of them were located in Iraq Centre. Not only that, UNICEF found that the increase of girls going to school was across all levels of education. Therefore, the unequal enrollment numbers between boys and girls could potentially change so that universal education can be achieved by all at equal rates.

=== Healthcare ===
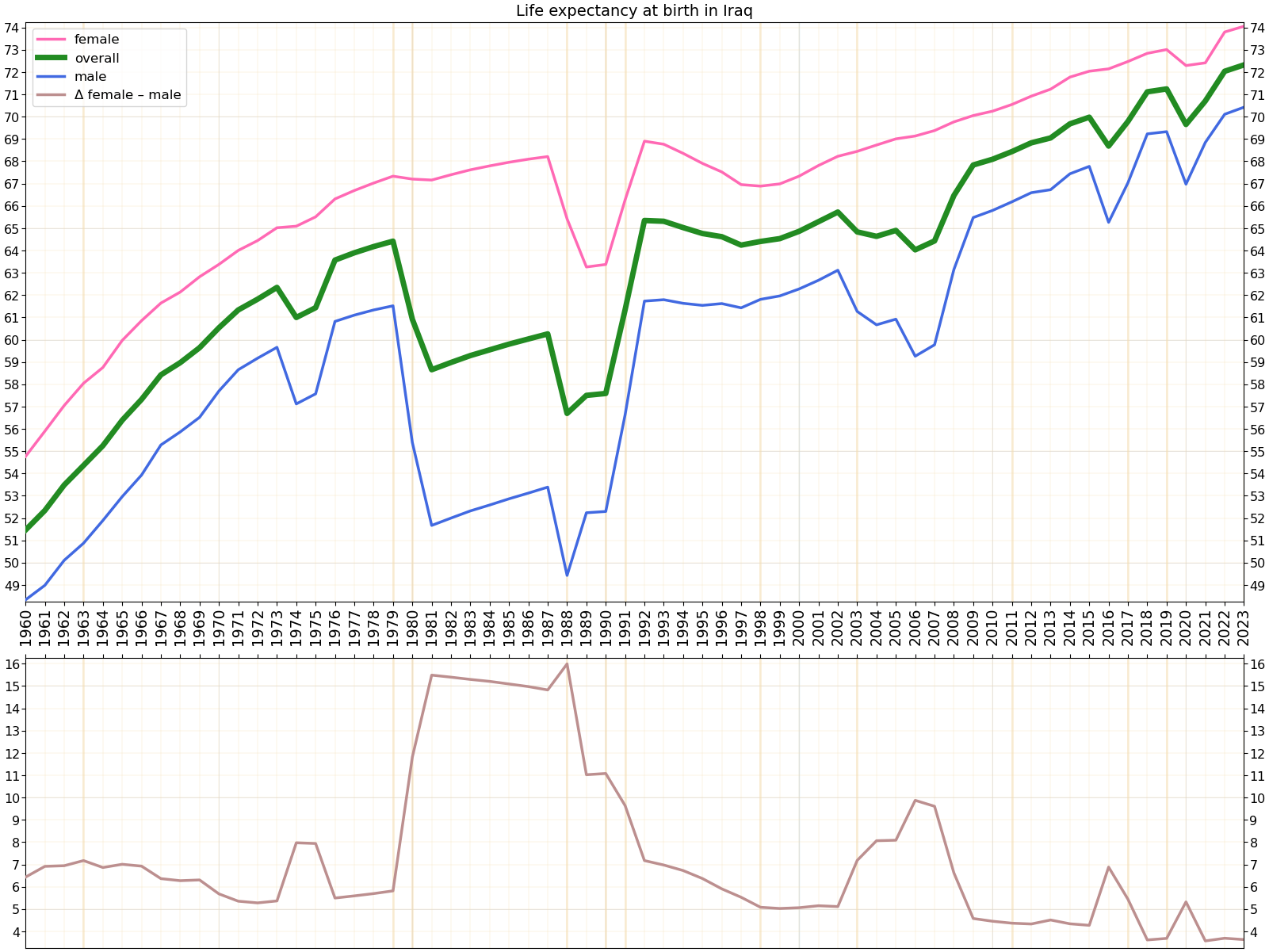
Development of life expectancy in Iraq

Iraq had developed a centralized free and universal healthcare system in the 1970s using a hospital based, capital-intensive model of curative care. The country depended on large-scale imports of medicines, medical equipment and even nurses, paid for with oil export income, according to a "Watching Brief" report issued jointly by the UNICEF and the World Health Organization in July 2003. Unlike other poorer countries, which focused on mass health care using primary care practitioners, Iraq developed a Westernized system of sophisticated hospitals with advanced medical procedures, provided by specialist physicians. The UNICEF/WHO report noted that prior to 1990, 97 percent of the urban dwellers and 71 percent of the rural population had access to free primary health care; just 2 percent of hospital beds were privately managed.

=== Private security ===
Because of the danger posed by Iraq's ongoing insurgency, the security industry has been a uniquely prosperous part of the services sector. Often run by former US military personnel, in 2005 at least 26 private military companies offered personal and institutional protection, surveillance, and other forms of security.

=== Retail and hospitality ===
In the early post-Hussein period, a freewheeling retail trade in all types of commodities straddled the line between legitimate and illegitimate commerce, taking advantage of the lack of income tax and import controls.

Al Basheer shopping center, Najaf

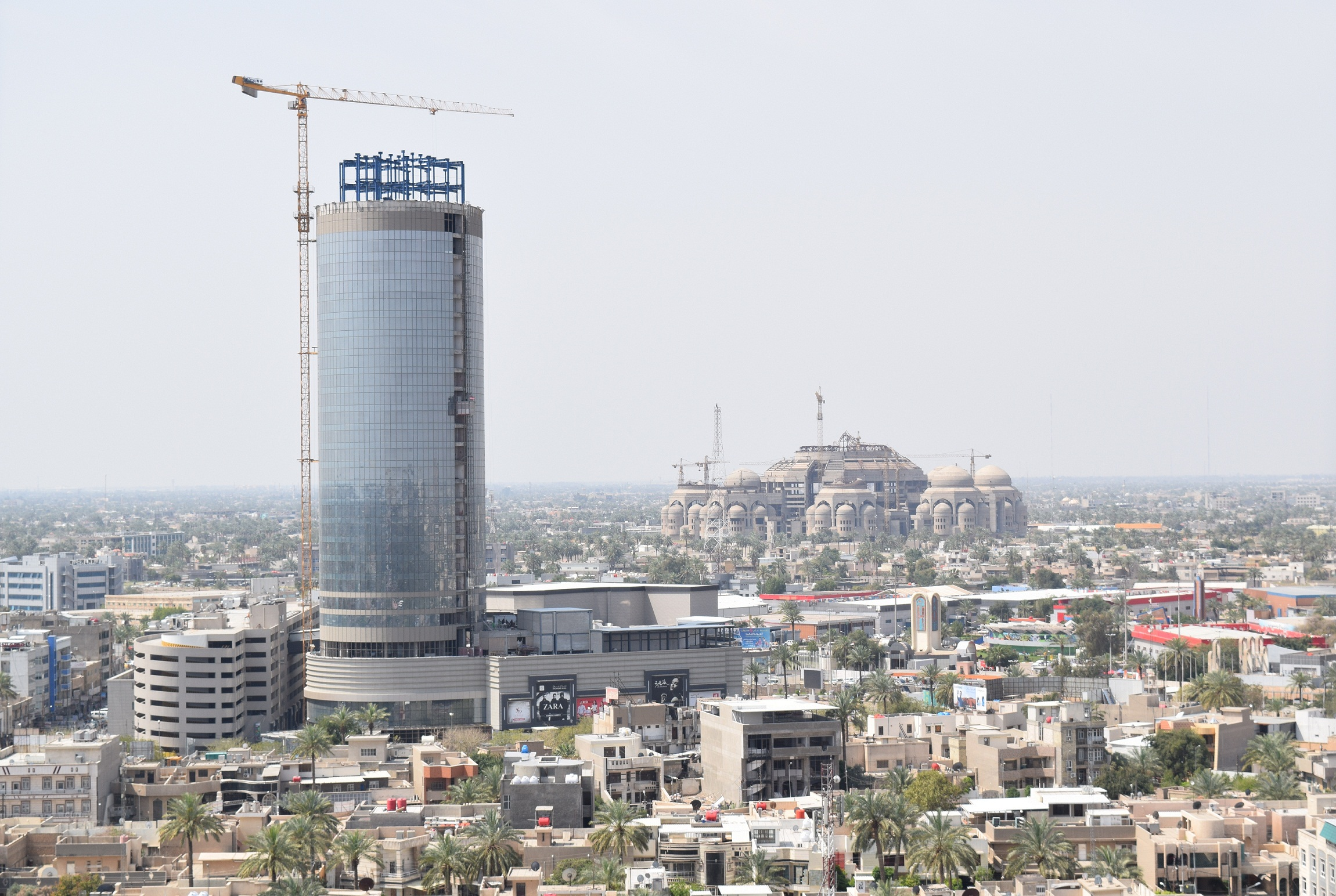
Baghdad Mall

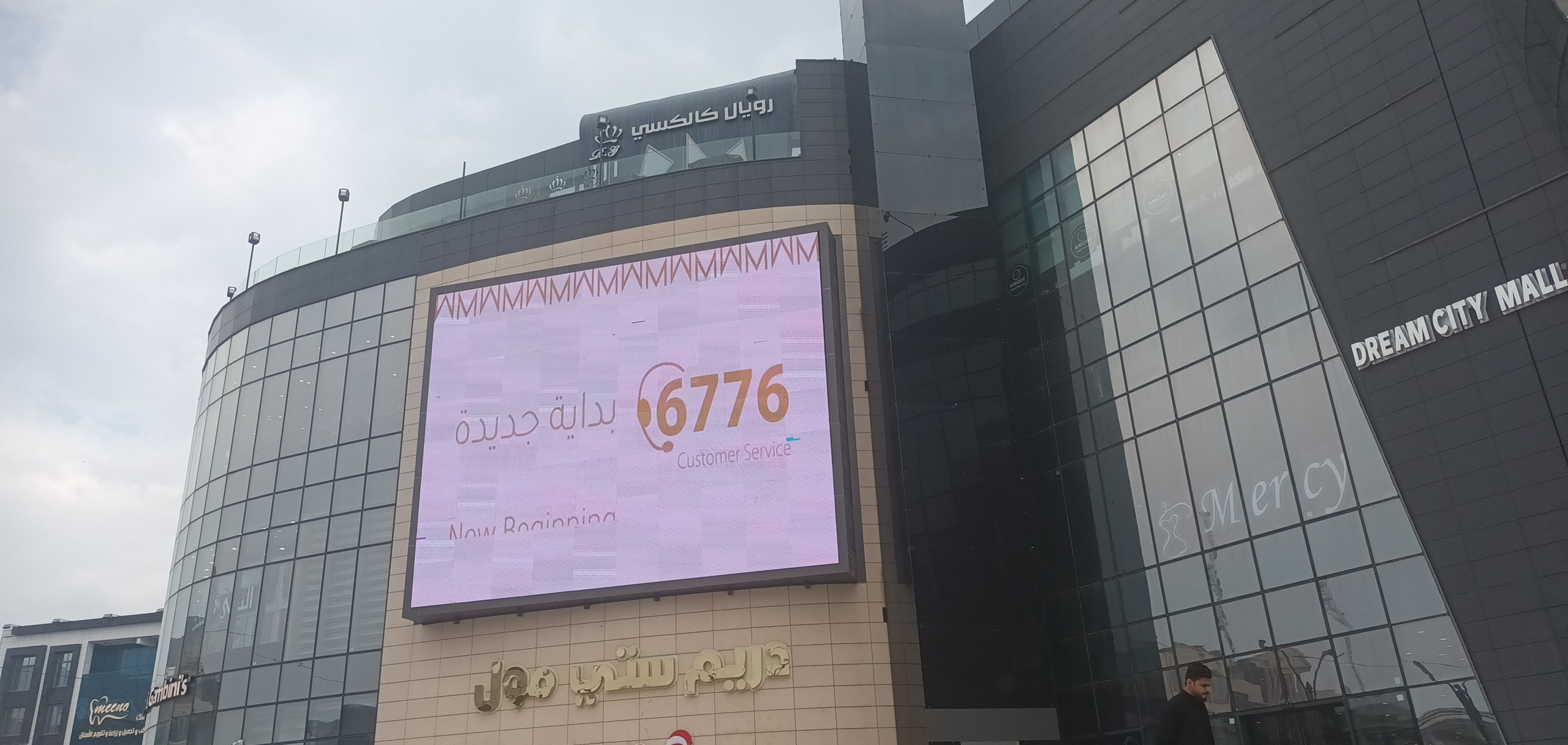
Dream City Mall

Zayoona Mall

Babylon Mall

A mall in Basra

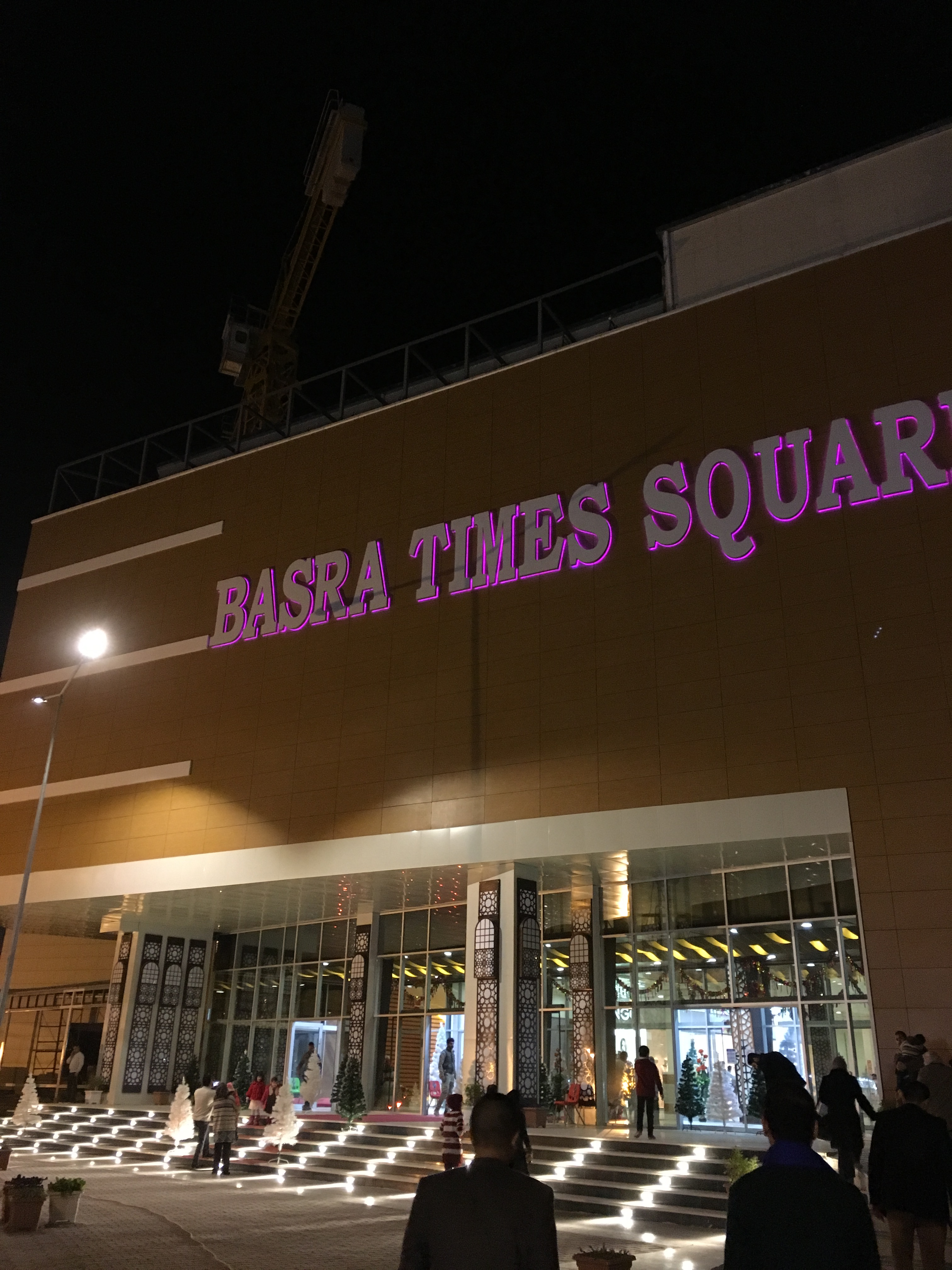
Basra Times Square

=== Tourism ===
The Iraqi tourism industry, which in peaceful times has profited from Iraq's many places of cultural interest (earning US$14 million in 2001), has been dormant since 2003. Despite conditions, in 2005 the Iraqi Tourism Board maintained a staff of 2,500 and 14 regional offices. Between 2009 and 2010, 165 tourists from 16 countries entered Iraq to visit historic sites; as of January 2011, a U.S. State Department grant provided $2 million to help preserve Babylon, supporting the re-opening of one of the site's two museums.

=== Telecommunications ===
From 2003 to 2008, mobile phone subscriptions had expanded over hundred-fold to ten million nationwide, according to the Brookings Institution.

=== Transport ===
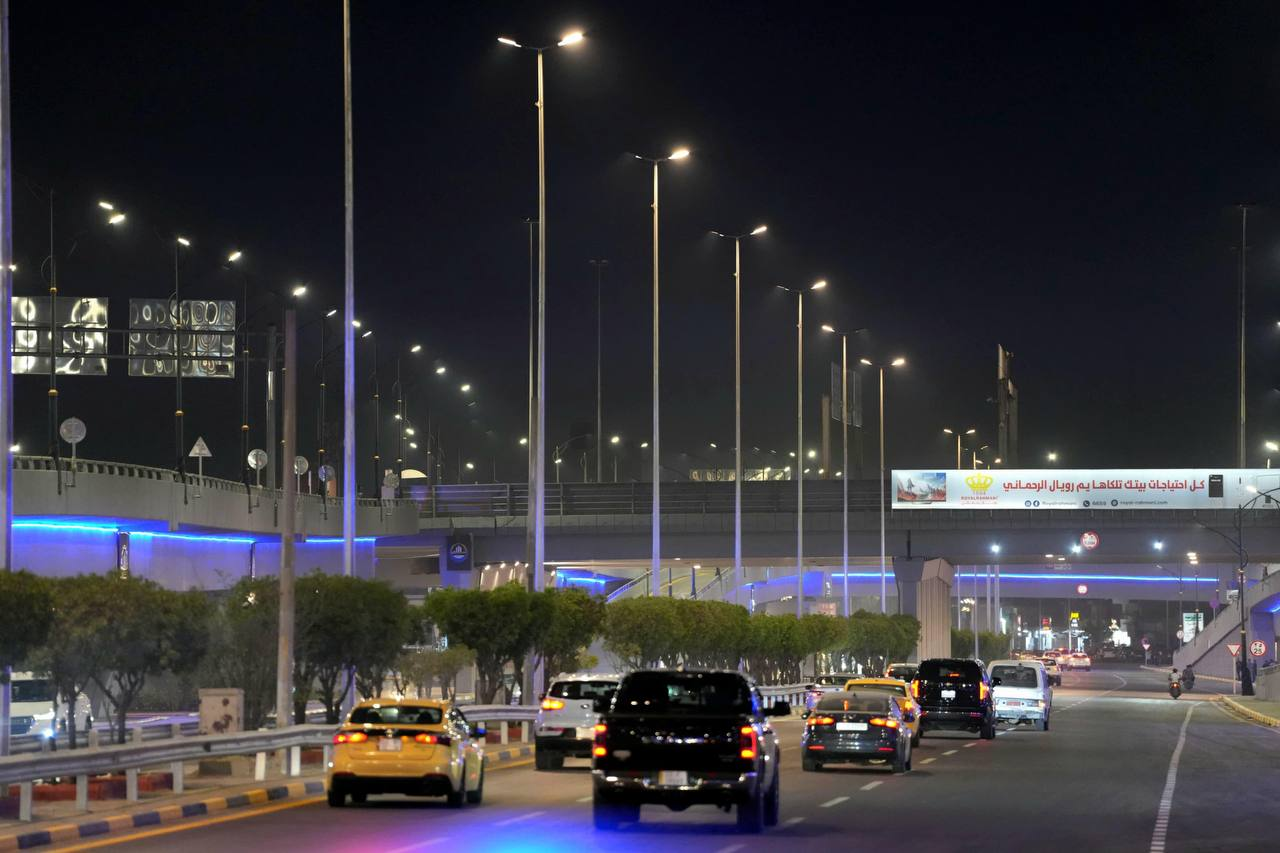
A modern highway in Baghdad, illuminated at night with active traffic and urban lighting.

Transport in Iraq consists of railways, highways, waterways, pipelines, ports and harbors, marines and airports.

== Labor force ==
In 2002, Iraq's labour force was estimated at 6.8 million people.

In 1996, some 66.4 per cent of the labour force worked in services, 17.5 per cent in industry, and 16.1 per cent in agriculture. 2004 estimates of Iraq's unemployment ranged from 30 per cent to 60 per cent. Unemployment and underemployment have been extremely high since the 1990s—a considerable change for a country that had traditionally imported labour. As in many Islamic countries, the standard workweek is Sunday through Thursday, but many labourers toil six or seven days per week, some with more than one job.

Nationwide unemployment rate since May, 2003
Month	Unemployment rate
2003-2005 May	N/A
2003-2006 June	50-60%
2003-2007 July	N/A
2003-2008 August	50-60%
2003-2009 September	N/A
2003-2010 October	40-50%
2003-2011 November	N/A
2003-2012 December	45-55%
January to May 2004	30-45%
June to November 2004–06	30-40%
2004-12 December	28-40%
January to October 2005	27-40%
November to December 2005	25-40%
2006	25-40%
2007	25-40%
2008	25-40%
2009	23-38%
2010	15.2%
2011	15.2%
2012	15.3%
2013	15.1%
2014	15%
2015	15.5%
2016	16%

The CPA has referred to a 25% unemployment rate, the Iraqi Ministry of Planning mentioned a 30% unemployment rate, whereas the Iraqi Ministry of Social Affairs claims it to be 48%. Other sources are claiming a 20% unemployment rate and a probably 60% under-employment rate. The actual figure is problematic because of high participation in black market activities and poor security conditions in many populous areas. In central Iraq, security concerns discouraged the hiring of new workers and the resumption of regular work schedules. At the same time, the return of Iraqis from other countries increased the number of job seekers. In late 2004, most legitimate jobs were in the government, the army, the oil industry, and security-related enterprises. Under Saddam Hussein's reign, many of the highest-paid workers were employed by the greatly overstaffed government, whose overthrow disrupted the input of these people to the economy. In 2004, the U.S. Agency for International Development committed US$1 billion for a worker-training program. In early 2004, the minimum wage was US$72 per month.

Social welfare in Iraq relies primarily on the Public Distribution System (PDS) for universal food rations, the Social Safety Net (SSN) for poverty-targeted cash transfers and a dual pension structure for public and private sector workers. The system is currently fragmented and most social security programs relied on informal funds.

== External trade ==
Exports of Iraq by product category (2019) Chemical products Transportation Machines Mineral products Plastics and rubbers Metals Foodstuffs Precious metals Textiles Instruments Animal products Vegetable products Paper goods Footwear and headwear Miscellaneous Stone and glass Wood products Animal and vegetable bi-products Animal hides Arts and antiques Weapons

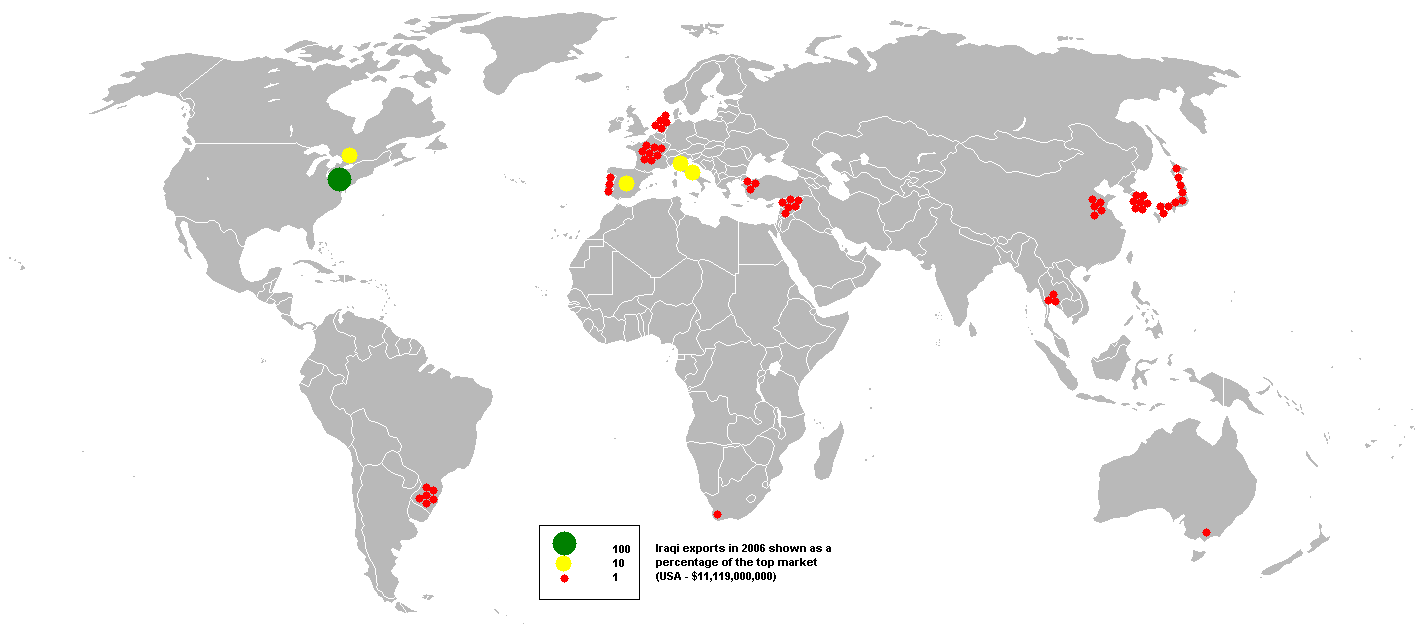
Iraqi exports in 2006

Iraq is a founding member of the OPEC cartel. Petroleum constitutes 99,7% of Iraq's exports with a value of $43.8 billion in 2016.

From the 1990s until 2003, the international trade embargo restricted Iraq's export activity almost exclusively to oil. In 2003, oil accounted for about US$7.4 billion of Iraq's total US$7.6 billion of export value, and statistics for earlier years showed similar proportions. After the end of the trade embargo in 2003, the range of exports expanded, but oil continued to occupy the dominant position: in 2004 Iraq's export income doubled (to US$16.5 billion), but oil accounted for all but US$340 million (2 per cent) of the total. In late 2004, sabotage significantly reduced oil output, and experts forecast that output, hence exports, would be below capacity in 2005 as well. In 2004, the chief export markets were the United States (which accounted for nearly half), Italy, France, Jordan, Canada, and the Netherlands. In 2004, the value of Iraq's imports was US$21.7 billion, incurring a trade deficit of about US$5.2 billion. In 2003, the main sources of Iraq's imports were Turkey, Jordan, Vietnam, the United States, Germany, and Britain. Because of Iraq's inactive manufacturing sector, the range of imports was quite large, including food, fuels, medicines, and manufactured goods. By 2010, exports rose to US$50.8 billion and imports rose to US$45.2 billion. In 2009, Iraq's main export partners were the U.S., India, Italy, South Korea, Taiwan, China, Netherlands, and Japan, while its main import partners were Turkey, Syria, U.S., China, Jordan, Italy, and Germany.

In March 2022, Iran-Iraq trade reached a volume of 10 billion USD, as joint ventures increased significantly but were still limited due to sanctions against Iran. Especially goods originating from Iran were subject to a trade embargo imposed by the United States and the European Union. Iran and Iraq signed a memorandum of understanding (MOU) on economic cooperation in January 2021.

== See also ==
- Economy of the Kurdistan Region
- List of companies of Iraq
- Corruption in Iraq
- Environmental issues in Iraq
- Humanitarian crises of the Iraq War
- Human trafficking in Iraq
- Illegal drug trade in Iraq
- Iraq and the International Monetary Fund
- Iraq–Europe Development Road
- Ministry of Finance (Iraq)
- Ministry of Planning (Iraq)
- Ministry of Trade (Iraq)
- Red Line Agreement
- Trade Bank of Iraq
- Economy of the Middle East
