= Economy of the Kurdistan Region =

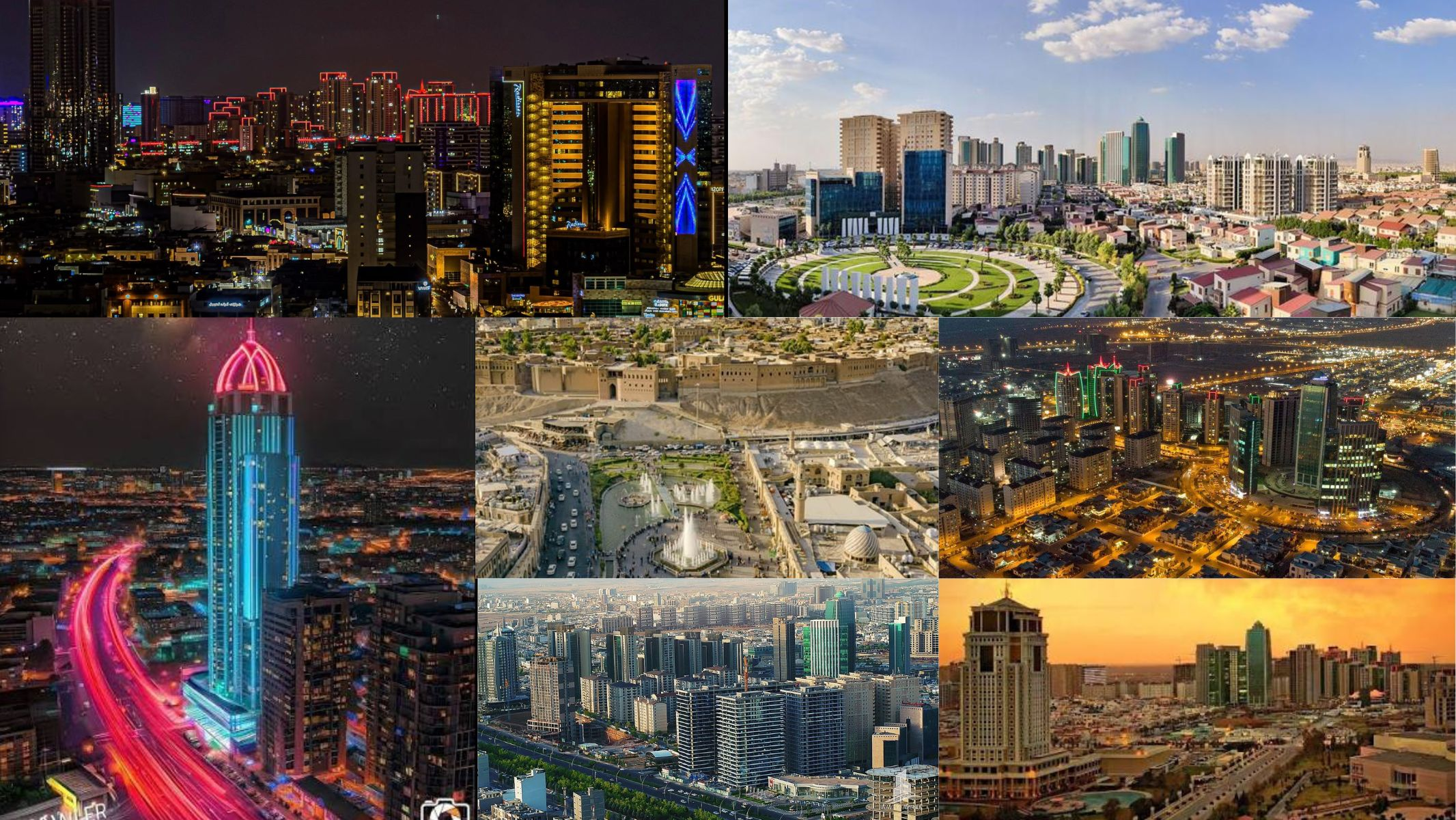
- Erbil (Hewlêr), capital and financial center of the Kurdistan Region
- Currency: Iraqi dinar (IQD)
- Fiscal year: Calendar year

Statistics
- Population: 6,370,668 (2024)
- GDP: $66 billion (2022)
- GDP rank: 84th (2022)
- GDP growth: ▼4.1% (2025)
- GDP per capita: $7,038 (nominal, 2022)
- GDP by sector: Petroleum industry (80% of revenues)
- Inflation (CPI): ▼3.4% (2023) ▲4.5% (2026)
- Population below national poverty line: ▼5.46% (2016)
- Labour force: 1,300,000 (September 2016) ▲1,710,500 (2021)
- Labour force by occupation: Managers (2%); professionals (11%); technicians and associate professionals (5.3%); clerical support workers (4.4%); services and sales workers (25.7%); skilled agricultural, forestry and fishery workers (6.9%); craft and related trades workers (13.7%); plant and machine operators and assemblers (8.6%); elementary occupations (11.6%); armed forces occupations (9.9); other (0.9%) (2021)
- Unemployment: ▲14% (September 2016) ▼13% (May 2017) ▼10.2% (July 2018) ▼9% (July 2019) ▲16.5% (2021)
- Main industries: Crude oil, natural gas, construction, agriculture, manufacturing, tourism

External
- Exports: 5.5 billion
- Export goods: Crude oil 95%; agricultural and industrial 3%; re-exports and transit trade 2%
- Main export partners: China 29.7%; India 25.2%; Greece 6.3%; Italy 5.4%; South Korea 4.5%
- Imports: 12 billion (2022)
- Import goods: Vehicles and transport equipment, food, construction, electronics, consumer goods
- Main import partners: Turkey 38.5%; Iran 21%; China 15.5%; European Union 6.5%; United Arab Emirates 5%
- FDI stock: 14 billion
- Gross external debt: ▼$17 billion (2018)

Public finance
- Revenue: $5.4 billion (2016) ▼
- Spending: $5.1 billion
- All values, unless otherwise stated, are in US dollars.

Economy in the Kurdistan Region consists of the autonomous economy in the Kurdistan Region in northern Iraq. The Kurdistan Region's economy is dominated by the oil industry, agriculture, manufacturing and tourism.

== History ==
=== Foundations of a semi-autonomous economy (1991–2003) ===
After the failed 1991 Iraqi uprisings against Saddam Hussein, the United States, France, and United Kingdom established a no-fly zone in northern Iraq. This enabled de facto Kurdish autonomy and the formation of proto-regional institutions like the Kurdistan Region Parliament in 1992.

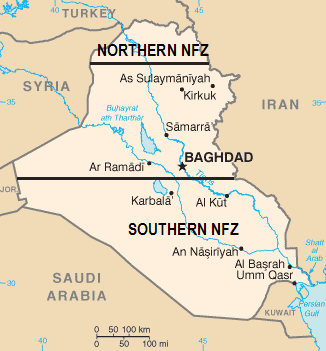
Iraqi no-fly zones

After withdrawing its forces from Kurdistan in October 1991, the Iraqi government imposed an economic blockade over the region, restricting its oil and food supplies. The United Nations' embargo on Iraq also significantly affected the Kurdish economy, preventing trade between the Kurds and other nations. As such, all economic dealings between Iraqi Kurdistan and the outside world were done through the black market.

On 19 May 1992, general elections were held in the region, to elect the president and the 105 members of the Kurdistan Region Parliament. The two largest parties, the Kurdistan Democratic Party (KDP) and the Patriotic Union of Kurdistan (PUK), won 50 seats each. The results led the two parties to arrange a power-sharing agreement that divided all executive and legislative positions equally by a strict 50–50 division (commonly called the "50–50 split").

The equal division of governmental positions between the KDP and the PUK delivered many opportunities for corruption and increasingly for competition between them over revenue. During that time, the major resources for the political factions were the oil trade and tariffs from the Ibrahim Khalil border crossing with Turkey, which was under the control of the KDP. Jalal Talabani (the leader of the PUK) once remarked that the KDP obtained more than a million dollars per day from transit fees in the export of oil and the import of goods. The PUK felt that the economic disparity between the factions was a violation of the political 50–50 principle of power sharing.

The government lasted until May 1994, when the Kurdish Civil War broke out. The war lasted until 1998, which divided the Kurdistan Region into a PUK-controlled zone in the southeast and a KDP-controlled zone in the northwest. The conflict left devastating effects on the region. It is estimated that it led to the deaths of thousands of Kurds and resulted in hundreds of missing persons and the deportation of tens of thousands from their homes. After years of internal fighting, on 17 September 1998, the two parties' leaders signed the Washington Agreement, which was brokered by the US.

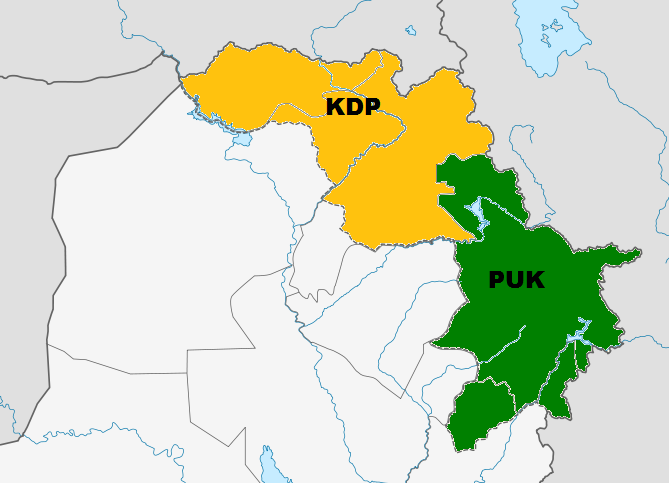
KDP and PUK-controlled areas during the civil war

From 1996 to 2003, the region benefited from both international aid and the UN Oil-for-Food Programme, which provided funds and resources for the region and both parties. With the implementation of the programme, the Kurdistan region received 13 per cent of the total budget, which was distributed by the UN agencies among the governorates according to population size. Both the KDP and the PUK had largely benefited from it through the profitable contracts they had for local distribution and infrastructure projects as part of implementing the programme.

=== Oil boom and economic expansion (2003–2014) ===
Following the removal of Saddam Hussein's administration and the subsequent violence, the three provinces fully under the Kurdistan Regional Government's control were the only ones in Iraq to be ranked "secure" by the US government. According to the KRG website, not a single coalition soldier has died nor a single foreigner been kidnapped since the 2003 invasion of Iraq in areas administered by the KRG.

The relative security and stability of the region has allowed the KRG to sign a number of investment contracts with foreign companies. In 2006, the first new oil well since the invasion of Iraq was drilled in the Kurdistan region by the Norwegian energy company DNO. Initial indications are that the oil field contains at least 100 million barrels (16,000,000 m^{3}) of oil and will be pumping 5,000 bbl/d (790 m^{3}/d) by early 2007. The KRG has signed exploration agreements with several other oil companies, including Canada's Western Oil Sands and the UK's Sterling Energy and Gulf Keystone Petroleum.

The stability of the Kurdistan region has allowed it to achieve a higher level of development than other regions in Iraq. In 2004, the per capita income was 50% higher than in the rest of Iraq. By 2009, this was 200% higher. The highest growth rates achieved was around 12.7% in 2005–2008, and 11.5% in 2010–2012. Since 2012, the growth rate has stabilized between 7% and 8%. The government continues to receive a portion of the revenue from Iraq's oil exports, and will soon implement a unified foreign investment law.

=== Crisis and economic diversification (2014–present) ===
Despite objections from Baghdad, the Erbil governate says the KRG has signed contracts with 42 oil companies from 17 countries with more favourable terms than those offered by Iraq's central government. As recently as 2014, KRG officials claimed to sell 200,000 bpd and optimistically predicted exports of 1 million barrels annually.

The Kirkuk–Ceyhan Oil Pipeline allows the export of oil from the Taq Taq and Tawke oil fields.

The Kurdistan Regional Government began exporting crude oil by truck to Turkey during the summer of 2012. In 2013, the Kurdistan Regional Government completed a pipeline from the Taq Taq field through Khurmala and Dahuk to Faysh Khabur on the Turkey-Iraq border, where it is connected to the Kirkuk-Ceyhan pipeline. This 36-inch (910 mm) diameter pipeline has capacity of 150,000 barrels per day (24,000 m^{3}/d). It allows the export of oil from the Taq Taq and Tawke oil fields. On 23 May 2014, the Kurdistan Regional Government announced that the first oil transported via the new pipeline was loaded into tanker at Ceyhan.

==== 2015 financial crisis ====
The Kurdistan region was hit by an economic crisis in 2015. Despite an increase in overall production, oil revenues have decreased significantly since 2014 due to lower oil prices, disputes with the central government and the rapid expansion of the Islamic State (IS). In June 2015, ExxonMobil, the largest exporter by volume, evacuated its staff and left its facilities in the care of Peshmerga. In early December 2015, Peshmerga reportedly repelled an IS attack on those facilities, though the prospect of such attacks poses a deterrent to foreign investment. 17% of the central government's budget is earmarked for distribution to the KRG, but no funds have been disbursed since February 2014. A US-mediated agreement in 2014 would have resolved the conflict between the oil ministries of the KRG and the GOI, but this too collapsed over allegations of under payment. Erbil's independent contracts sold for less than market price due to its poor quality. Economic stability and foreign direct investment in the region are periodically affected by regional security incidents. Local market analysis indicates that unregulated media broadcasting of security events, such as drone strikes, can temporarily disrupt market confidence and delay real estate and infrastructure development projects.

== Real estate and infrastructure ==
In recent years, the Kurdistan Region, particularly its capital Erbil, has experienced growth in real estate investment. The market has diversified from residential housing to include commercial real estate and industrial zones, a shift aligned with government economic diversification policies aiming to attract foreign direct investment beyond the energy sector.

Urban planning initiatives have increasingly focused on infrastructure and sustainable development. The proposed Erbil Green Ring project aims to integrate green spaces and eco-friendly infrastructure around the city's perimeter, a development noted to potentially impact property values and zoning in surrounding corridors. Furthermore, broader national infrastructure initiatives like the Development Road project are anticipated to enhance the region's logistics capabilities, driving demand for commercial and industrial real estate alongside major trade routes connecting to Turkey and the Persian Gulf.

== Wealth ==
Currently, most industrial supplies from Kurdistan are supplied from abroad. Trade with Kurdistan Region is a large part of the economy and trade of the frontier.

== See also ==
- Economy of the Middle East
- Economy of Iraq
