= Ministry of Industry and Minerals (Iraq) =

Government ministry of Iraq

Coordinates: 33°19′43″N 44°25′0″E

Republic of Iraq Ministry of Industry and Minerals
- وزارة الصناعة والمعادن
- Coat of arms of Iraq

Agency overview
- Formed: 1959
- Jurisdiction: Government of Iraq
- Headquarters: Rusafa, Baghdad (Iraq)
- Minister responsible: Muhammad al-Karbouli, Minister
- Website: Official website

The Ministry of Industry and Minerals (Arabic: وزارة الصناعة والمعادن) is a central government ministry of Iraq responsible for industrial development as well as mineral exploration and extraction.

== See also ==
- Ministry of Finance
- Ministry of Planning
- Ministry of Trade
