= Abdel Falah al-Sudani =

Iraqi politician

Abdel Falah Hassan Hamadi al-Sudani is an Iraqi politician who was the Minister of Trade from May 2006 to May 2009 in the government of Nouri al-Maliki. He previously served as Education Minister in the Iraqi Transitional Government from May 2005 to May 2006.

== Background ==
Sudani was born in Basra in 1947 and went into exile in Britain in the late 1970s. In 1981 received a doctorate in Biochemistry from the University of Wales. He is a member of the Islamic Dawa Party - Iraq Organisation.

== Minister ==
Sudani was appointed as Education Minister in the Iraqi Transitional Government in May 2005. The following year, following the election of Nouri al-Maliki as Prime Minister, he was moved to Minister of Trade. In June 2006 Australian troops mistakenly shot dead one of his bodyguards, provoking a diplomatic crisis.

== Corruption charges ==
On 3 May 2009, arrest warrants were issued by the anti-corruption Integrity Commission on eight trade ministry officials, including two of al-Sudani's brothers and the head of the Iraqi Grain Board. The head of the Council of Representatives of Iraq's Integrity Committee, Sabah al-Saedi from the Islamic Virtue Party, called on al-Sudani to resign. al-Saedi said the ministry had become "a remarkable source of corruption and squandering of public funds" When the official arrived to arrest the accused, there was a fifteen-minute gunbattle between Iraqi troops and ministry bodyguards. One suspect was arrested but the other eight managed to escape.

He resigned as Trade Minister on 14 May. At first, the Prime Minister delayed accepting this whilst the parliamentary investigation was on-going. He appeared before the parliamentary committee on 16–17 May, admitting that corruption had taken place and the system had to be changed. Finally, the Prime Minister accepted his resignation on 26 May.

Al-Sudany faced a vote of no confidence on May 27 from the parliament to determine whether he should face criminal charges. Three days later he was arrested at Baghdad airport as he was trying to fly to Dubai. He was interrogated in prison by anti-corruption officials for eight days and then released on bail of 50 million dinars.

In June 2012 he was convicted in absentia and sentenced to seven years in jail for corruption relating to a food import programme.

In January 2018 he was extradited from Lebanon and handed over to Iraqi authorities after the Interpol assisted in his arrest.

In February 2018, al-Sudani was found guilty by an Iraqi court and sentenced to 21 years in jail on corruption charges.
