= Iraq and the International Monetary Fund =

Flag of Iraq

Iraq was one of the original members of the IMF, joining the IMF on December 27, 1945. Iraq provided $1663.89 million SDR, Special Drawing Rights, to the IMF, which is 0.35% of total SDR paid to the IMF. It also has 18,103 votes, which is 0.36% of the total votes distributed to the member countries of the IMF. The current Board of Governor of Iraq is Ali Muhsin Ismail with an alternative Board of Governor, Khaled Salah Alddin Mohammed Murad. Iraq is the part of the constituency with other countries such as Bahrain, Egypt, Jordan, Kuwait, Lebanon, Maldives, Oman, Qatar, United Arab Emirates, and Republic of Yemen. This constituency has 127,164 votes, 2.53% of total votes in the IMF. Since first joined, Iraq faced 4 official arrangements from the IMF: first arrangement on December 23, 2005, and the latest arrangement on July 7, 2016.

== History ==
As one of the original members of IMF, Iraq joined the IMF on December 27, 1945. According to Article II, Section I of the IMF agreements, the original members of the IMF are those countries that contributed at "the United Nations Monetary and Financial Conference" that was held in Bretton Woods, New Hampshire, from July 1 to 22nd. The chairman of Iraq at the United Nations Monetary and Financial Conference was Ibrahim Kamal.

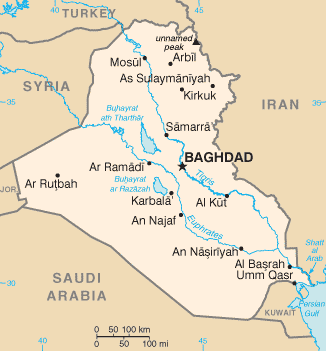
Map of Iraq

== Arrangements ==
There was a total of 4 arrangements Iraq faced from the IMF.

=== First arrangement ===
First Arrangement was on December 23, 2005. It was for 15 months cycle originally, with the expiration date of March 2007. However, the Iraqi government requested to extend the expiration date, and the first arrangement actually expired on December 18, 2007. The IMF and Iraq agreed with the amount of $475,360 SDR, which is 40% of the total quota of the Iraqi government. However, Iraq has drawn $0 from that arrangement amount agreed with the IMF. The reason why Iraq faced the arrangement from the IMF was to gain an economic background for the Iraq government's new economic development program for next year, 2006. Iraq's economic program for 2006 comprises putting emphasis on administrations, distributing resources correctly regarding the issues of oil products, and accelerating prices of oil products. The IMF and the Iraqi government decided to improve economic growth to 10% and to reduce the inflation rate to 15%.

=== Latest arrangement ===
The latest arrangement was on July 7, 2016, with a 3-year cycle. Its expiration date was July 6, 2019 with the agreed amount of 3,831,000 SDR. Iraq government has drawn 1,494,200 SDR from the agreed amount and has an outstanding amount of 1,437,325 SDR. The Iraqi government tried to settle the economy which as affected by the global decline of oil prices and the ISIS crisis. Most of those arrangements were to stabilize exchange rates and remove restrictions on exchange rates. In addition, to hinder money laundering, terrorism, and illegal economic actions. The latest arrangement faced multiple problems including military actions against ISIS and aids regarding the confliction with ISIS.
