= Ministry of Planning (Iraq) =

Government ministry of Iraq

Republic of Iraq Ministry of Planning
- وزارة التخطيط العراقية
- Coat of arms of Iraq

Agency overview
- Formed: 1959
- Jurisdiction: Government of Iraq
- Headquarters: Green Zone, Baghdad
- Minister responsible: Qutayba Ghazi Majid, Minister
- Child agency: see Agencies
- Website: Official Website

The Ministry of Planning (MoP; Arabic: وزارة التخطيط العراقية) is a central government ministry of Iraq whose task is to promote economic growth and human development through strategic planning as well as to realize sustainable development, social justice, poverty-alleviation, the reduction of unemployment, institutional reform, and development of standardisation.

== Overview ==
The ministry prepares developmental policies and strategic plans and programmes encompassing all aspects of economic and social development. It seeks to ensure the optimal investment of human and material resources as well as to enhance the quality of government performance and create partnerships in both the public and private sectors.

It collaborates with the private sector as well as international institutions, monitors the implementation of investment projects, develops economic and social policies, evaluates legislation and conducts national censuses. Furthermore, it seeks to lay the foundation for data-driven decision-making by promoting information technology and developing a comprehensive national database in line with the government's vision of creating an information society.

== Tasks ==
The strategic goals and tasks of the ministry's departments:

1. Conducting research and studies and developing plans and perceptions that achieve the goal of economic and human development in Iraq in cooperation with public and private agencies.
2. Preparing, implementing and following up the annual and five-year comprehensive development plans strategy.
3. Provide indicators, statistical data and necessary information needed by state agencies, and establish a comprehensive national information base.
4. Supervision and follow-up of the international cooperation file with regard to grants and technical assistance.
5. Work to provide the requirements for the establishment of the information society in Iraq and make the most of the information revolution, spread its culture and enhance its practices in state departments and the general community, in order to reach the goal of e-government.
6. Sponsoring and supporting the Iraqi private sector, studying the reality of this sector and overcoming the difficulties and obstacles it faces.
7. Developing a detailed framework and proposing strategic projects that require huge capital and a longer period of time for implementation, in cooperation with the rest of the state agencies.
8. Evaluation and follow-up of government contracting activity in the field of investment and development.
9. Adjusting measurement, improving the quality of imported and local goods, and promoting intellectual creativity in a way that enhances the national economy.
10. Studying human development needs to contribute to the provision of job opportunities and employment and social services for the population.
11. Preparing and implementing a strategy to reduce poverty and unemployment.
12. Preparing and proposing work plans and programs that contribute to building institutional capacities and developing the human element. It is a tool and axis for achieving development.
13. Promoting the concept of partnership and good governance and adopting international and local quality standards.
14. Follow-up evaluation of the performance of the implementation of investment projects and raise the efficiency of implementation.
15. Developing economic and social policies.
16. Evaluating legislation related to the comprehensive development process.
17. Transforming the current expected population increase from a burden on the development process into a productive force that represents a positive engine and a key actor in the development process, in order to achieve higher rates of economic growth and factors of population welfare.
18. Preparing a sectoral, spatial, rural, urban, and local strategy that achieves economic efficiency, exploits comparative advantages, and achieving social justice.

The ministry seeks to achieve these tasks by means of objectivity, participation, neutrality, transparency, integration, collaboration and sustainability.

== Organizational structure ==
The ministry is composed of the following departments:

- Department of Economic and Financial Policy
- Department of Human Development
- Department of Regional and Local Development
- Department of Sector Development
- Department of State Investment Projects
- Department of International Collaboration
- Legal Department
- Department of Public Government Contracts
- Department of Administration and Finance
- Department of Information Technology
- Department of Poverty Alleviation Strategy

== Agencies ==
- Central Statistical Organization
- Central Organization for Standardization and Quality Control
- The National Center for Management Development and Information Technology
- The Iraqi Commission for Accreditation
- Social Fund for Development

== Iraq Vision 2030 ==
In February 2019, in a step towards reform and development after a long period of wars and conflicts, the Iraqi Ministry of Planning in cooperation with the UNDP, the World Bank, and experts from three Iraqi universities (Baghdad University, Kufa University, and Nahrain University), set forth a development agenda titled "Iraq Vision 2030". It defines the challenges the country has been facing, including high population growth (unsustainable rapid urbanisation), deprivation, unemployment, indecent work, internal displacement caused by conflicts, child labor, corruption and inefficient governance, and unsustainable over-reliance on volatile oil prices for revenue. In addition, it defines the framework to solve these issues. It laid the foundation to achieve sustainable development and reform in five areas; that is, manpower, governance, economic diversification, society, and the environment.

=== Developing manpower ===
1. Create decent and protected job opportunities for all unemployed people.
2. High quality and inclusive education system.
3. Efficient and inclusive healthcare system.
4. Provide decent housing and end informal settlements.

=== Good governance ===
1. Uphold rule of law, access to justice and enhance the good governance foundations.
2. Improve administrative decentralization and public participation in decision-making.
3. Integrity, transparency, and fighting corruption.
4. Reform public financial administration and achieve financial sustainability.

=== Economic diversification ===
1. High and sustainable economic growth rate.
2. Increase the oil sector efficiency.
3. Strong private sector which contributes to development.
4. Develop the agricultural sector and achieve food security.
5. Developed infrastructure.
6. Active and well-governed financial sector.

=== Safe society ===
1. Enhance the culture of tolerance, dialogue, and community peace.
2. Appropriate development of families, women and vulnerable groups.
3. Enhance the values of citizenship and reduce the aspects of inequality.
4. Sustainable solutions for displacement and internal and external emigration.

=== Sustainable environment ===
1. Reduce environment pollution and greenhouse emissions.
2. Efficient use of water resources.
3. Environmental conservation.
4. Develop the consumption and production patterns to achieve environmental sustainability.
5. Protect biodiversity and revive the Mesopotamian marshes/

In every section, specific pertinent sub-goals are defined separately. Furthermore, an institutional framework was put in place to guarantee the implementation of the agenda and monitor its progress. It includes the Follow-up Unit (comprising the minister and undersecretaries, as well as other experts), the National Committee of Sustainable Development, and the provincial Sustainable Development Committees.

=== Strategic Plan 2022–2025 ===
The Ministry of Planning is responsible for adopting the relevant practical strategic frameworks used in order to fulfil its vision of achieving comprehensive sustainable development and those goals in line with Vision 2030 and other programs. In 2022 the ministry prepared a short-term 3 year-long strategic plan in this regard.

The short-term strategic plan seeks to be participatory, in that the collaboration of senior leadership, undersecretaries, heads of agencies and general managers during all stages of preparation and implementation must be guaranteed; and responsive/flexible in responding to short-term and long-term challenges and overcoming them; and realistic in that the plan and policymaking is based on and guided by objective facts and realistic circumstances and time-frames; and compatible in that the strategic plan of the ministry is in line with the general strategic vision of the state; and implementable in that standards and benchmarks are set in place in order to monitor the progress of the plan's implementation; and rateable/reviewable in that a report on the progress of the plan's implementation is presented and analysed annually and the results are utilized in preparing new short-term strategic plans; and deliverable in that the vision of the ministry is communicated effectively to all personnel in order to ensure correct understanding and implementation of the strategic plan, and receive feedback.

=== Strategic Plan 2026–2030 ===
Ministry of Planning spokesman Abdul Zahra al-Hindawi announced on 27 June 2025, that "the [Ministry's] Supreme Technical Committee, headed by Deputy Prime Minister and Minister of Planning Mohammed Ali Tamim, approved the third poverty alleviation strategy for the years 2026–2030 and that "the approved strategy will be submitted to the Council of Ministers for approval in its final and official form, to enter into force at the beginning of 2026 and until the end of 2030." The strategy is defined by seven main axes, from which more than 38 activities are distributed across various sectors, focusing on supporting the poor and vulnerable members of society specifically in the following areas: health, housing, education, income and food, in addition to elderly care and people with disabilities, children as well as women's empowerment, and the effects of climate change and facing emergencies such as epidemics. The Ministry of Planning laid out general policies, plans and procedures to be implemented by institutions such as the Ministries of Health, Construction and Housing, Education, Higher Education, Labour and Social Affairs, as well as local governments and the private sector. The strategy aims to reduce the poverty rate in Iraq by 50% over the next five years, from the current 17.5% to between 8–9%.

== Ministers of Planning ==
- Tal'at Al-Shaybani (1959–1963)
- Abdul Karim Al-Ali (1963–1964)
- Abdul Hassan Zalzala (1964–1966)
- Salman Abdul Razaq Al-Aswad (1966–1967)
- Mohammed Yaqub Al-Asadi (1967–1968)
- Jawad Hashim (1968–1971)
- Rasheed Al-Rifai (1971–1979)
- Taha Ibrahim Al-Abdullah (1979–1981)
- Thamer Razuqi Al-Shaykhali (1981–1982)
- Samal Majeed Faraj (1982–1993)
- Hassan Abdul Munim Khattab (1993–2003)
- Mohammed Ali Al-Hakim (2003–2004)
- Mehdi Al-Hafidh (2004–2005)
- Barham Salih (2005–2006)
- Ali Ghaleb Baban (2006–2011)
- Nassar Al-Rubayie (2011)
- Ali Yusuf Al-Shukri (2011–2014)
- Fuad Hussein (2014)
- Salman Al-Jamili (2014–2018)
- Nouri Sabah Al-Dulaymi (2018–2020)
- Khalid Battal Najim (2020–2022)
- Mohammed Ali Tamim (2022–present)

== See also ==
- Ministry of Finance
- Ministry of Industry
- Ministry of Trade
