= Agrarian Reform Law of 1970 =

Iraqi land redistribution law

The Iraqi Agrarian Reform Law No. 117 of 1970 was a law that sought to remove control of land owned by the traditional rural elites and redistribute it to peasant families under the Ba'ath Party of Saddam Hussein. The law is broken into 52 articles providing different institutions that enforce the law, as well as defining the various types of land to be redistributed, and how much is to be redistributed. Although there were land reform laws passed before, the 1970 Agrarian Land Reform Law took it further. This law reduced the maximum amount of holdings of land to between 10 and 150 hectares (1 hectare= 2.471 acres) of irrigated land and to between 250 and 500 hectares of non-irrigated land. The government also reserved the right to lower the holding ceiling and to get rid of old and new landowners through eminent domain.

== Article 1 ==
Sets up the Supreme Agricultural Council, which will be responsible for redistributing state owned land. A cultivator is defined as someone who was assigned to cultivate an agricultural unit under the abolished Sirf-Miri Land Law No. 43 of 1951. A "tenant" is defined as the person with whom the owner of the land agrees on reclaiming and planting trees in a specific area for a specific period and under specific terms. A "peasant" is defined as any person that took up farming as a profession and who carries out land work in return for a certain share of the crop. An "agricultural laborer" is someone who works the land in return for wages. A "Landlord" is someone who owns the land as registered with the Tapu (Land Registration Department) or to whom the land is leased by Lezma.

== Article 2 ==
Article 2 establishes the amounts given to areas that are considered "Rain-Irrigated Land" and "Irrigated Areas." The areas of agricultural land possessed by a person Tapu-authorized or granted under long lease (rain-irrigated land, irrigated areas) shall not exceed the limits defined in article 2.

== Article 3 ==
Establishes the regulations regarding how much land can be owned via inheritance and how the amount of land can change in cooperation with state activities.

== Article 4-6 ==
Gives specifications regarding ownership and the control of land by the state if it goes over the stipulations in Article 2.

== Results ==
The Agrarian Reform Law of 1970 placed more limitations on the size of land holdings "and authorized the government to expropriate additional acreage from large landowners."

The government redistributed most of the land seized under the law and gave it to landless peasants and small land owners, although some of the land was rented out. The redistribution was huge; "Between 1970 and 1982, 264,400 farmers received grants of land."

Although the original purpose of the land reform law had been to do away with large estates and to establish small owner operated farms, fragmentation of the farms occurred and this made mechanization of farms difficult to achieve. Therefore, in the 1970s, the government turned to collectivization and by 1981 the government established 28 collective state farms that employed 1,346 people and utilized 180,000 hectares of land. "In the 1980s, however, the government expressed disappointment at the slow pace of agricultural development, conceding that collectivized state farms were not profitable."
