= Humanitarian crises of the Iraq War =

The Iraq War resulted in multiple humanitarian crises.

== Humanitarian crises ==
On December 14, 2008, a New York Times article by James Glanz and T. Christian Miller discussed the pending release of a report that criticizes the Bush administration for failing to effectively plan for post-combat operations in Iraq. The 513-page report was authored by US Republican Party lawyer Stuart Bowen, who is the Special Inspector General for Iraq Reconstruction. According to the article, the report "depicts an effort crippled before the invasion by Pentagon planners who were hostile to the idea of rebuilding a foreign country, and then molded into a $100 billion failure by bureaucratic turf wars, spiraling violence and ignorance of the basic elements of Iraqi society and infrastructure." The report was to have been officially presented on February 2, 2008, but was apparently leaked by civilians working reconstruction activities in Iraq.

=== Iraqi health care deterioration ===
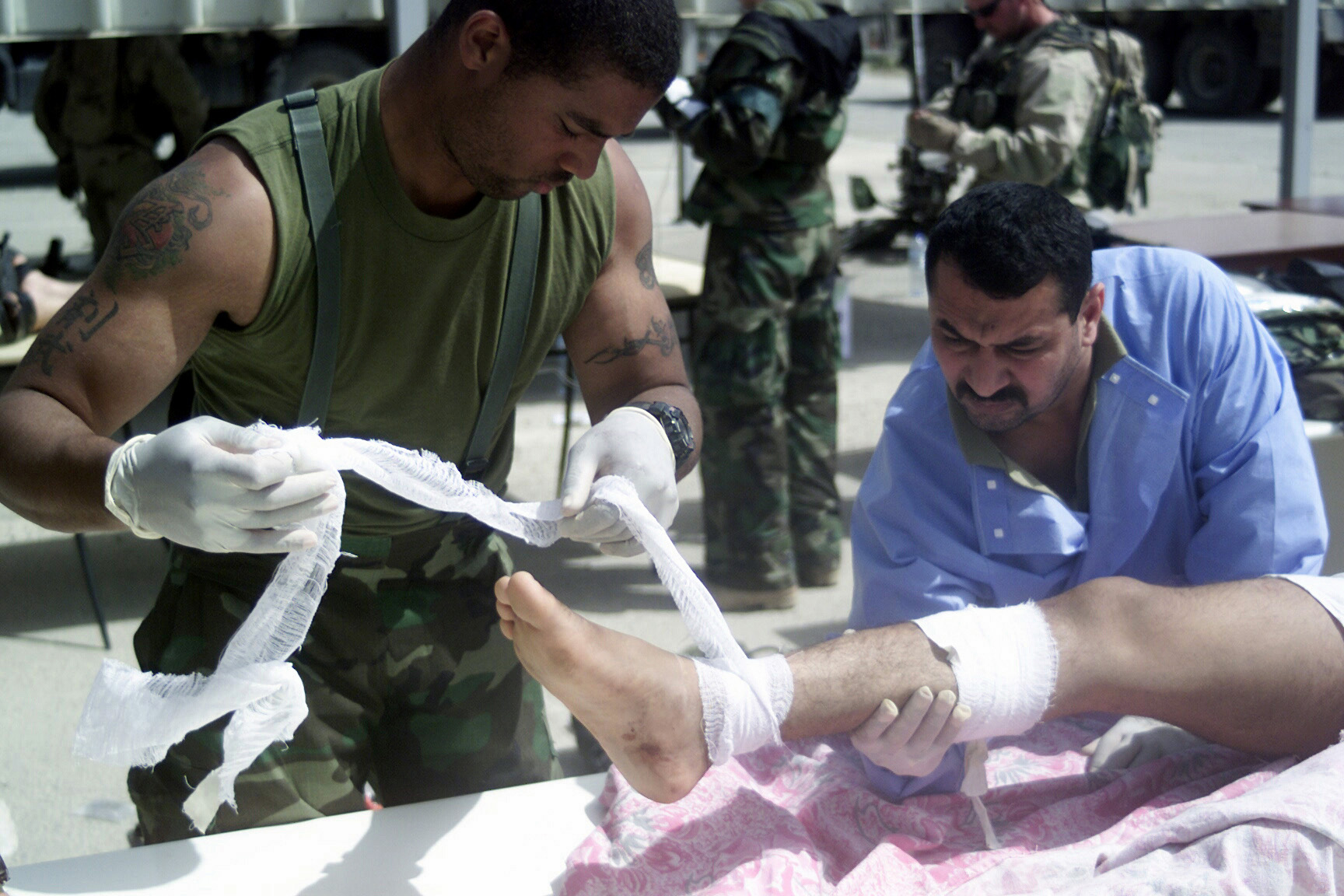
A US Navy (USN) Hospital Corpsman and Iraqi doctor, provide medical aid to an Iraqi civilian, injured during fighting between Insurgents and Coalition forces near Umm Qasr, Iraq, in March 2003.

In a report entitled "Civilians without Protection: The Ever-Worsening Humanitarian Crisis in Iraq", produced well after the stepped-up US-led military operations in Baghdad began on February 14, 2007, the International Red Cross and Red Crescent Movement said that millions of Iraqis are in a disastrous situation that is getting worse, with medical professionals fleeing the country after their colleagues were killed or abducted. Mothers are appealing for someone to pick up the bodies on the street so their children will be spared the horror of looking at them on their way to school. Red Cross Director of Operations Pierre Kraehenbuehl said that hospitals and other key services are desperately short of staff, with more than half the doctors said to have already left the country.

According to an anonymous Iraqi government official, 1,944 civilians and at least 174 soldiers and policemen were killed in May, 2007, a 29% increase in civilian deaths over April. The Iraqi government's estimate of the number of civilian deaths has always been much lower than reports from independent researchers, such as the Lancet surveys of Iraq War casualties. Mortar attacks in the capital are becoming deadlier.

Between June 18 and July 18, 2007, up to 592 unidentified bodies were found dumped in Baghdad. Most of the approximately 20 per day found by the police have been bound, blindfolded and shot execution style. The police attribute these deaths to Sunni and Shi'ite death squads. According to Baghdad medical sources, many have also shown signs of torture and mutilation. Despite official Iraqi and U.S. statements to the contrary, the reports indicated that the number of unidentified bodies in the capital rose to pre-surge levels in July. Media reports have indicated that the U.S. military has usually focused on areas where they have been attacked rather than districts witnessing such sectarian reprisal killings.

Iraq's health has deteriorated to a level not seen since the 1950s, said Joseph Chamie, former director of the U.N. Population Division and an Iraq specialist. "They were at the forefront", he said, referring to health care just before the 1991 Persian Gulf War. "Now they're looking more and more like a country in sub-Saharan Africa." Malnutrition rates have risen from 19% before the US-led invasion to a national average of 28% four years later. 68% of Iraqis have no access to safe drinking water. A cholera outbreak in northern Iraq is thought to be the result of poor water quality. As many as half of Iraqi doctors have left the country since 2003.

In December 2007 the Iraqi government announced plans to cut food rations and subsidies by almost 50 per cent as part of its overall 2008 budget because of insufficient funds and rising inflation. Apart from the cut in subsidies, Baghdad also wants to reduce the number of people dependent on the rationing system by five million. Rationing was first introduced in 1991 after the UN Security Council imposed sanctions on Iraq but the country has seen an alarming rise in poverty since the 2003 invasion. Nearly 10 million Iraqis living in poverty now depend heavily on the rationing system.

=== Orphans ===
On December 15, 2007, a conference dedicated to orphans in Iraq was held in Baghdad. Moussa Faraj, chief of Iraq's anti-corruption board reported that official government statistics revealed that there were five million orphans in Iraq. During the same conference, Wijdan Salem Mikhail, the Iraqi Minister of Human Rights, stated that the phenomenon of orphans in Iraq "is one of the most passive things that grew immensely during the past few years due to destructive wars and unbridled violence in the country." The Iraqi parliament's women and family committee have proposed a draft law to set up a fund for the orphans.

On January 21, 2008, an NGO called Monitoring Net of Human Rights in Iraq (MHRI) said the Iraqi Ministry of Labor and Social Affairs released a report estimating that there were 4.5 million Iraqi orphans, with 500,000 living on the streets without any home or family care. The report further said there were only 459 orphans in governmental houses of orphans while there were 800 Iraqi orphans in American Iraqi prisons. Amal Kashefal-Ghetaa, the president of the Islamic Foundation of Woman and Child, explained that "a massive change took place in the lives of children that forced many of them to leave their schools and friends to go to work; a matter that affects them mentally." Sociologist Atheer Kareem said the negative situation that children in Iraq are experiencing would increase their suffering unless the government in Iraq responds by issuing legislation.

In March 2012, Nael al-Musawi, the chairman of the Baghdad Provincial Council's social welfare committee reported on the council's draft law to provide comprehensive care for orphaned children in Iraq. He stated that "there are around 100,000 orphans in Baghdad," noting that "this number differs from estimates made by some local civil society organisations, which claimed the number of orphaned children in Baghdad alone has surpassed one million." He also reported that the Council estimates "the overall number of orphans across Iraq to be no more than 400,000." A report from the United Nations in 2008 said that there was "around 870,000 children orphaned by the death of one or both parents in Iraq."

A survey headed by UNICEF called the Multiple Indicator Cluster Survey 2011 (MICS4), published in December 2012, measured the prevalence of orphans in Iraq. The survey found that, "about five percent of children aged 0–17 years are orphans who have lost one or both parents, and about two percent are not living with a biological parent and 92 percent of children live with both parents." The highest proportion of orphans was found in the governorates of Diala, Baghdad and Al-Anbar. A report on the survey published by the BBC estimated that these rates correspond to a finding that "between 800,000 to a million Iraqi children have lost one or both of their parents." The survey was the largest ever conducted in Iraq, sampling 36,580 households.

=== Iraqi refugees ===
There are more than 4.7 million refugees of Iraq, more than 16.3% of the population. Two million fled Iraq while approximately 2.7 million are internally displaced people. The United Nations High Commissioner for Refugees estimated on April 29, 2008, that 2 million Iraqis had fled to neighboring countries and 2.7 million were displaced internally, with nearly 100,000 Iraqis fleeing to Syria and Jordan each month.

Roughly 40% of Iraq's middle class is believed to have fled, the U.N. said. Most are fleeing systematic persecution and have no desire to return. All kinds of people, from university professors to bakers, have been targeted by militias, insurgents and criminals. An estimated 331 school teachers were slain in the first four months of 2006, according to Human Rights Watch, and at least 2,000 Iraqi doctors have been murdered and 250 kidnapped since the 2003 U.S. invasion. Iraqi refugees in Syria and Jordan live in impoverished communities with little international attention to their plight and little legal protection. Many of the Iraqi women fleeing the war in Iraq are turning to prostitution.

Although Christians represent less than 5% of the total Iraqi population, they make up 40% of the refugees now living in nearby countries, according to U.N. High Commissioner for Refugees. UNHCR estimates that Christians comprise 24% of Iraqis currently seeking asylum in Syria. The census in 1987 counted 1.4 million Christians, however since the 2003 invasion radicalized Iraqi culture, the total number of Christians dropped to about 500,000, half of which live in Baghdad.

=== Ethnic cleansing ===
Between October 2003 and March 2005 alone, 36% of the 700,000 Iraqis who fled to Syria were Assyrians and other Iraqi Christians, judging from a sample of those registering for asylum on political or religious grounds. Furthermore, the small Mandaean and Yazidi communities are at the risk of elimination due to ethnic cleansing by Islamist extremists.

Entire neighborhoods in Baghdad were ethnically cleansed by Shia and Sunni militias and sectarian violence has broken out in every Iraqi city where there is a mixed population. Sunnis have fled Basra, while Shias were driven out of cities and towns north of Baghdad such as Samarra or Baquba. Satellite shows ethnic cleansing in Iraq was key factor in "surge" success. Some areas are being evacuated by every member of a particular group due to lack of security, moving into new areas because of fear of reprisal killings.

For decades, President Hussein 'Arabised' northern Iraq. Now his ethnic cleansing is being reversed. Thousands of ethnic Kurds pushed into lands formerly held by Iraqi Arabs, forcing at least 100,000 of them to flee to refugee camps. Sunni Arabs have driven out at least 70,000 Kurds from Mosul's western half. The policies of Kurdification by KDP and PUK after 2003 (with non-Kurds being pressured to move, in particular Assyrian Christians and Iraqi Turkmen) have prompted serious inter-ethnic problems.
