= Ministry of Trade (Iraq) =

Government ministry of Iraq

Coordinates: 33°19′17″N 44°22′0″E

Republic of Iraq Ministry of Trade
- وزارة التجارة
- Coat of arms of Iraq

Agency overview
- Headquarters: Baghdad, Iraq
- Minister responsible: Atheer Daoud Al-Ghurairy, Minister
- Child agency: see Establishments
- Website: mot.gov.iq

iThe Ministry of Trade (MoT; Arabic: وزارة التجارة) is a central government ministry of Iraq tasked with regulating and facilitating trade activities. It owns a conglomeration of state-owned enterprises and operates a nearly $6bn annual budget that provides a monthly public food distribution program for Iraqis. This conglomerate also manages the import of grain, seeds, and construction materials.

While Iraq is a potentially wealthy country due to huge oil deposits, decades of wars and sanctions have led to the collapse of infrastructure and social services. These occurrences have resulted in many people being left without sufficient food or nutrition. A 2008 survey estimated that 930,000 Iraqis were food insecure, with an additional 6.4 million vulnerable to food security without the Public Distribution System (PDS).

== History ==
Iraq's food rationing system was established in 1995 as part of the United Nations Oil-for-Food Programme following Iraq's invasion of Kuwait. Under the Public Distribution System (PDS) every Iraqi, irrespective of income level, is entitled to a monthly food ration for a nominal fee. Most of the Ministry's 3,000 trucks and 400 warehouses are dedicated to the PDS. However, the program has been plagued by mismanagement and corruption since the 2003 US-led invasion. With annual costs running at more than US$4 billion, the Iraqi government is looking at ways to reform the system to target only the most vulnerable people in need of such assistance.

Anti-corruption officials and the Iraqi army went to the ministry's offices in central Baghdad on April 29, 2009, to detain nine people on corruption charges. Their attempted roundup triggered a 15-minute gunfight between the military and the minister's security team. Only the minister's spokesman, Mohammed Hanoun was detained. Two ofIraqi Trade Minister Abdel Falah al-Sudani's brothers, one who worked for the ministry and one who headed the Iraqi Grain Board, were arrested the following day.

In May 2009, Sudani resigned as trade minister and was later arrested amid allegations of corruption and embezzlement linked to the nation's food assistance program. Sudani, a member of Prime Minister Nouri al-Maliki's Shiite Dawa faction, had been questioned by parliament over claims relating to imports for Iraq's food rationing program. The minister was accused of importing expired commodities—sugar—and procuring illegal contracts as well as failing to fight corruption in his ministry.

In December 2009, the United Nations World Food Programme and the Iraqi Ministry of Trade signed a 'Memorandum of Understanding' under which the two parties agreed to work together to improve the supply chain management of the Public Distribution System (PDS) which provides a monthly food ration to millions of Iraqis. The agreement was signed in Baghdad by Edward Kallon and the Iraqi Minister of Trade, Dr Safa Al-Deen Alsafi.

== Mission statement ==
The official stated purpose of the Iraqi Ministry of Trade is to facilitate and promote trade and commerce in Iraq. It aims to encourage private sector development by removing regulations blocking trade and investment, eliminating import licensing rules, and embarking on wide-ranging projects to promote a new trading environment in Iraq: an anti-corruption drive, a consumer welfare and protection unit, a “Baghdad International Fair" site and the leasing of Iraqi shopping centers to private developers.

== Associated companies ==
The Iraqi Ministry of Trade has a number of associated State Companies: Iraqi Fairs, Food Stuff Trading, Constructions Stuff Trading, Grains Production, Grains Trading, Central Markets, and Vehicles and Machines Trading. In addition, there are also a number of 'directorates' for Private Sector Development, Planning and Purveying, Administrative and Financial Affairs, Economic and Foreign Affairs, and the Registration of Companies Department.

== Establishments ==
Establishment	Website
State Company for Iraqi Fairs and Commercial Services	https://web.archive.org/web/20130112094501/http://www.fairs.mot.gov.iq/
General Automobile and Machinery Company	https://www.gamcoiraq.gov.iq
State Trading Company for Construction Materials	http://www.trading-construction.com/
State Company for Foodstuff Trading	http://www.iraqsfsc.org/
Iraq Grain Company	http://www.iqgrainb.com
Central Markets Company

== List of countries with an Iraqi Commercial Attaché ==
- Iraqi Commercial Attaché Bulgaria
- Iraqi Commercial Attaché China
- Iraqi Commercial Attaché Egypt
- Iraqi Commercial Attaché France
- Iraqi Commercial Attaché India
- Iraqi Commercial Attaché Italy
- Iraqi Commercial Attaché Japan
- Iraqi Commercial Attaché Jordan
- Iraqi Commercial Attaché Russia
- Iraqi Commercial Attaché Tunis
- Iraqi Commercial Attaché Turkey
- Iraqi Commercial Attaché UK
- Iraqi Commercial Attaché USA

== See also ==
- Ministry of Agriculture
- Ministry of Finance
- Ministry of Industry
- Ministry of Planning
