= Illegal drug trade in Iraq =

The illegal drug trade in Iraq is complex, involving numerous countries. Traffickers in Syria, with its unstable security conditions, export drugs produced within its borders, as well as those from Lebanon, into Iraq. Iran plays a major role in Iraq's drug problem, with Iranian producers exporting drugs to Iraq and Iranian intermediaries facilitating the transport of Afghan drugs to southern Iraq, particularly to the Persian Gulf port city of Basra.

== Overview ==
Before the US invasion in April 2003, illicit drug activity in Iraq was minimal, as Saddam Hussein’s regime enforced severe penalties, including the death sentence, for both drug dealers and users. However, the situation shifted dramatically following the fall of the regime. Political and economic instability in Iraq has also contributed to the growth of criminal networks.

From 2019 to 2023, the country saw an increase of nearly 3,380 percent in the confiscation of Captagon, with over 4.1 tons of the drug seized in 2023.

Alcohol, hashish, and prescription drugs are the most commonly used substances in Iraq. Newer drugs emerging in the country's drug scene include the amphetamines "Captagon" and crystal methamphetamine, as well as the painkiller tramadol. Seizures of Captagon, methamphetamine, Afghan opium, theriac (a crude form of opium), and heroin at border crossings suggest these substances may be gaining popularity.

Iraqi authorities have reduced cross-border drug smuggling, particularly concerning the flow of Captagon from Syria. Captagon is trafficked from southern Syria, where Lebanese Hezbollah operates several factories to manufacture the drug, and is transported to Gulf states through Iraq and Jordan, with support from Iran-linked Iraqi militias.

While law enforcement agencies in Iraq have improved their technical capabilities in drug interdiction, the country's political leadership has not fully recognized Iraq's increasing role as both a transit hub and consumer of illegal drugs.

Interior ministers of Jordan, Syria, Lebanon, and Iraq have recognized "that there is a big problem, and it is drugs, and all our societies are suffering from this issue."

== See also ==
- Corruption in Iraq
- 2025 Lebanese government war on drugs
