= Federal government of Iraq =

Federal executive organ of Iraq

Federal Government of Iraq
- حكومة العراق
- Central government
- Coat of arms of Iraq

Overview
- Established: 28 December 2005; 20 years ago
- State: Iraq
- Leader: Prime Minister of Iraq
- Appointed by: President of Iraq
- Main organ: Cabinet
- Ministries: 23
- Responsible to: Council of Representatives
- Headquarters: Baghdad

The federal government of Iraq is the central executive authority of the Republic of Iraq. The Council of Ministers is the organ that represents it.

== Government ==
=== Executive branch ===
The executive branch is composed of the President and the Council of Ministers.

==== President ====
The President of the Republic is the head of state and "safeguards the commitment to the Constitution and the preservation of Iraq's independence, sovereignty, unity, the security of its territories in accordance with the provisions of the Constitution." The President is elected by the Council of Representatives by a two-thirds majority, and is limited to two four-year terms. The President ratifies treaties and laws passed by the Council of Representatives, issues pardons on the recommendation of the Prime Minister, and performs the "duty of the Higher Command of the armed forces for ceremonial and honorary purposes."

There is also a Vice President which assumes the office of the President in case of his absence or removal.

==== Council of Ministers ====
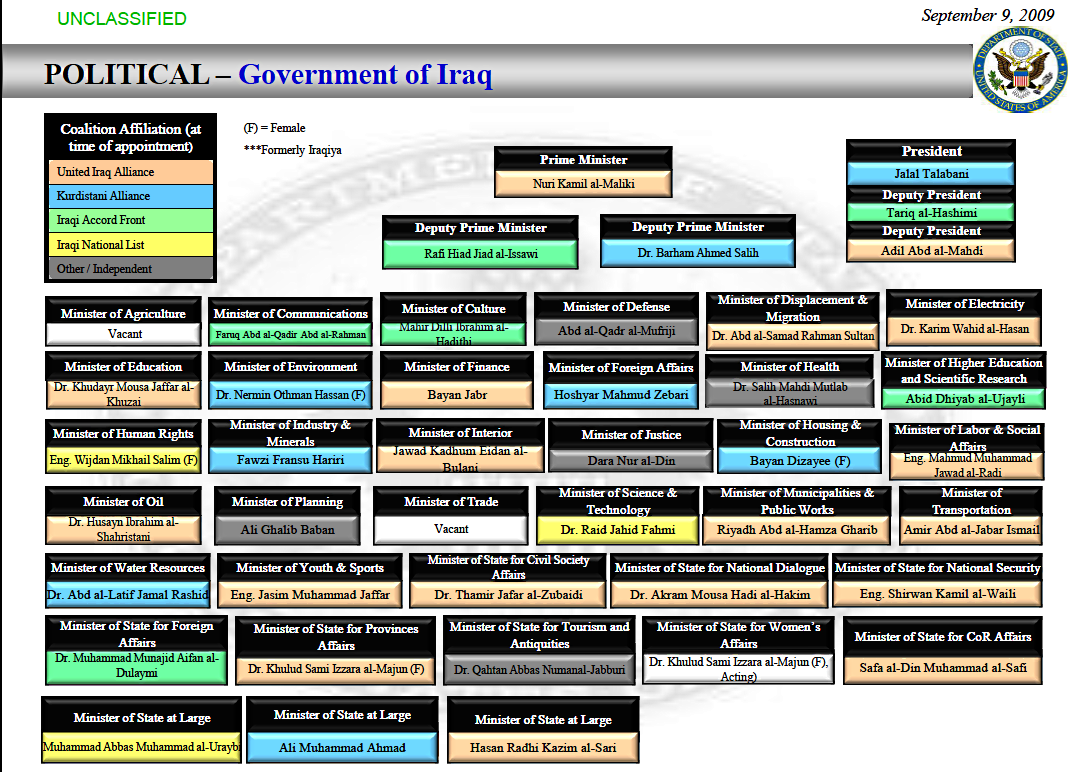
Composition of the Iraqi Government in September 2009

The Council of Ministers is composed of the Prime Minister as head of government and his cabinet. The President of Iraq names the nominee of the Council of Representatives bloc with the largest number to form the Cabinet. The Prime Minister is the direct executive authority responsible for the general policy of the State and the commander-in-chief of the armed forces, directs the Council of Ministers, and presides over its meetings and has the right to dismiss the Ministers on the consent of the Council of Representatives.

The cabinet is responsible for overseeing their respective ministries, proposing laws, preparing the budget, negotiating and signing international agreements and treaties, and appointing undersecretaries, ambassadors, the Chief of Staff of the Armed Forces and his assistants, Division Commanders or higher, the Director of the National Intelligence Service, and heads of security institutions.

==== List of ministries ====
- Ministry of Defense
- Ministry of Migration and Displaced
- Ministry of Electricity
- Ministry of Agriculture
- Ministry of Finance
- Ministry of Justice
- Ministry of Construction, Housing, Municipalities, and Public Works
- Ministry of Culture, Tourism and Antiquities
- Ministry of Communications
- Ministry of Education
- Ministry of Health
- Ministry of Environment
- Ministry of Industry and Minerals
- Ministry of Interior
- Ministry of Labor and Social Affairs
- Ministry of Oil
- Ministry of Planning
- Ministry of Trade
- Ministry of Transportation
- Ministry of Water Resources
- Ministry of Youth and Sports
- Ministry of Higher Education and Scientific Research
- Ministry of Foreign Affairs

==== Dissolved or merged ministries ====
- Ministry of Human Rights (dissolved in 2015)
- Ministry of Science and Technology (merged with Ministry of Higher Education and Scientific Research in 2015)
- Ministry of Construction and Housing (merged with Ministry of Municipalities and Public Works in 2015)
- Ministry of Municipalities and Public Works (merged with Ministry of Construction and Housing in 2015)

== See also ==
- Politics of Iraq
- Regions of Iraq
- Governorates of Iraq
- Kingdom of Iraq under British Administration
