= Al Abadi Government =

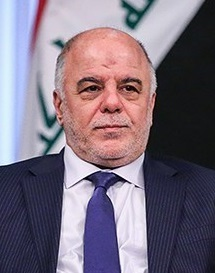
Haider al-Abadi, Iraqi Prime Minister from September 2014 to October 2018.

The Al Abadi government was approved by the Assembly on 8 September 2014, following the Iraqi general election in April 2014. The names of thirty-five ministers were approved, with the defense and interior ministries not yet filled. On 18 October 2014, the Iraqi parliament named Khaled al-Obaidi, a member of parliament's Sunni Arab Itihad al-Quwa al-Wataniyah bloc as defense minister, and Mohammed Al-Ghabban, a member of the Shiite Badr bloc, as interior minister. In August 2015, following popular protests against corruption and lack of services, backed by senior cleric Ali al-Sistani, the Prime Minister reduced the cabinet to 22 members.

== Composition ==
Portfolio	Website	Minister	Coalition	Party	Dates
Prime Minister		Haider al-Abadi	State of Law Coalition	Islamic Dawa Party	8 September 2014 - 25 October 2018
Sovereign Ministries
Interior Minister	www.moi.gov.iq	Mohammed Al-Ghabban	State of Law Coalition	Badr Organization	18 October 2014 - 25 October 2018
Finance Minister	www.mof.gov.iq	Hoshyar Zebari	?	?	18 October 2014 - 8 July 2016
Foreign Minister	www.mofa.gov.iq	Ibrahim al-Jaafari	?	?	8 September 2014 - 18 October 2014
Defense Minister	www.mod.mil.iq	Khaled al-Obaidi	Uniters for Reform	Iraqi Forces Alliance	18 October 2014 - 19 August 2016
Oil Minister	www.oil.gov.iq	Adil Abdul-Mahdi	Al-Muwatin Coalition	Islamic Supreme Council of Iraq	8 September 2014 - 19 July 2016
Other Ministries
Agriculture Minister		Falah Hassan al-Zidan	?	?	8 September 2014 -
Communications Minister	www.iraqimoc.net www.nmc.gov.iq	Kazem Hassan Rashed	?	?	8 September 2014 -
Construction & Housing Minister	www.moch.gov.iq	Tariq Kikhany	?	?	8 September 2014 -
Culture Minister	www.mocul.gov.iq	Faryad Rawandozi	?	?	8 September 2014 -
Displacement and Migration Minister	ww.momd.gov.iq	?	?	?	?
Education Minister		Mohammad Iqbal Omar	?	?	8 September 2014 -
Electricity Minister	www.moelc.gov.iq	Qasim Al-Fahadawi	Anbar Loyalty Coalition	?	8 September 2014 - 29 July 2018
Environment Minister	www.moen.gov.iq	Qutaiba al-Jubouri	?	?	8 September 2014 -
Health Minister	www.moh.gov.iq	Dr Adila Mahmoud Hussein	?	?	8 September 2014 -
Higher Education & Scientific Research Minister	www.mohesr.gov.iq	Hussain al-Shahristani	?	?	8 September 2014 -
Human Rights Minister	www.humanrights.gov.iq	Mohammed Mahdi al-Bayati	State of Law Coalition	Badr Organisation	9 September 2014 - 16 August 2015
Human Rights Minister	www.humanrights.gov.iq	post abolished			
Industry & Minerals Minister	www.industry.gov.iq	Naseer al-Issawi	?	?	8 September 2014 -
Justice Minister	www.moj.gov.iq	Haidar al-Zamli	?	?	8 September 2014 -
Labour & Social Affairs Minister	www.molsa.gov.iq	Mohammed Shia al-Sudani	?	?	8 September 2014 -
Municipalities and Public Works Minister	www.mmpw.gov.iq	?	?	?	?
Science & Technology Minister	www.most.gov.iq	Fars Younes Jeju	?	?	8 September 2014 -
Trade Minister	www.mot.gov.iq	Malas Abdulkarim al-Kasnazani	al-Wataniya	?	8 September 2014 - December 2015
Transport Minister	www.motrans.gov.iq	Baqir al-Zubaidi	Al-Muwatin Coalition	?	8 September 2014 -
Tourism & Antiquities Minister		?	?	?	?
Water Resources Minister	www.mowr.gov.iq	?	?	?	?
Women's Affairs Minister		Bayan Nouri	?	?	18 October 2014 - 16 August 2015
Women's Affairs Minister		post abolished			
Works & Planning Minister		Abadi Government	?	?	8 September 2014 -
Youth & Sport Minister	www.moys.gov.iq	Abdel Hussein Abdel Reza Abtan	?	?	8 September 2014 -
Ministers of State
Minister of State and Government spokesman	www.goi-s.com	?	?	?	?
Minister of State for Parliament Affairs		?	?	?	?
Minister of State		?	?	?	?
Minister of State		?	?	?	?
Minister of State		?	?	?	?
Minister of State		?	?	?	?
Minister of State for National Reconciliation		?	?	?	?
Minister of State for National Dialogue		?	?	?	?
Minister of State for Foreign Affairs		?	?	?	?
Minister of State for Tribal Affairs		?	?	?	?
Minister of State		?	?	?	?
Minister of State		?	?	?	?
Minister of State for National Security		?	?	?	?
Minister of State for Provincial Affairs		Ahmed Abdullah al-Jubouri	Al-Arabiya Coalition	Iraqi People’s Coalition	8 September 2014 - 16 August 2015
Minister of State for Provincial Affairs		post abolished			
Minister of State for Municipalities		Abdel Karim Younis	?	?	8 September 2014 -
Minister of State for Non-Governmental Organizations		?	?	?	?

Preceded by Al Maliki II Government	Al Abadi Government; 8 September 2014 – 25 October 2018	Succeeded by Abdul Mahdi Government
