= Mohammed Shia' al-Sudani =

Prime Minister of Iraq from 2022 to 2026

- محمد شياع السوداني
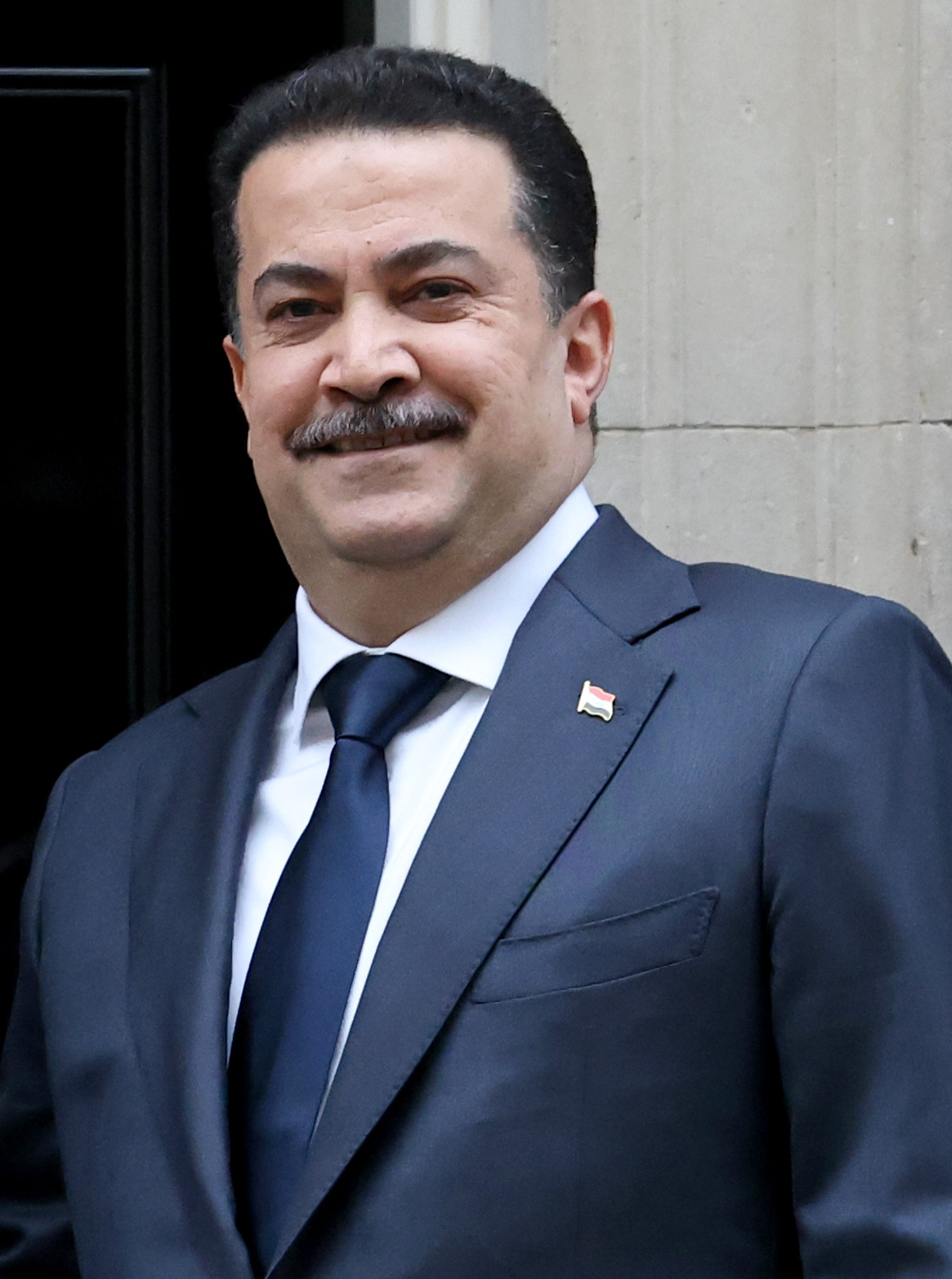
- Al-Sudani in 2025

Prime Minister of Iraq
- In office 27 October 2022 – 14 May 2026
- President: Abdul Latif Rashid; Nizar Amidi
- Preceded by: Mustafa Al-Kadhimi
- Succeeded by: Ali al-Zaidi

Minister of Defense
- Acting
- In office 28 January 2026 – 14 May 2026
- Prime Minister: Himself
- Preceded by: Thabit al-Abbasi
- Succeeded by: Nayif al-Shammari

Minister of Labour and Social Affairs
- In office 8 September 2014 – 25 October 2018
- Prime Minister: Haider al-Abadi
- Preceded by: Nassar al-Rubaye
- Succeeded by: Bassem al-Rubaye

Minister of Industry and Minerals
- Acting; 14 August 2016 – 25 October 2018
- Prime Minister: Haider al-Abadi
- Preceded by: Nasser Al Esawi
- Succeeded by: Salih Abdullah al-Jubouri

Minister of Trade
- Acting; 2016–2017
- Prime Minister: Haider al-Abadi
- Preceded by: Malas Abdulkarim al-Kasnazani
- Succeeded by: Salman al-Jamili

Minister of Migration and the Displaced
- Acting; 2014–2015
- Prime Minister: Haider al-Abadi
- Preceded by: Dindar Najman
- Succeeded by: Jassim Mohammed al-Jaf

Minister of Finance
- Acting; 8 September 2014 – 18 October 2014
- Prime Minister: Haider al-Abadi
- Preceded by: Najeeba Najeeb
- Succeeded by: Hoshyar Zebari

Minister of Agriculture
- Acting; 8 March 2013 – 8 September 2014
- Prime Minister: Nouri al-Maliki
- Preceded by: Izz al-Din al-Dawla
- Succeeded by: Falah Hassan al-Zidan

Minister of Human Rights
- In office 21 December 2010 – 18 October 2014
- Prime Minister: Nouri al-Maliki
- Preceded by: Wijdan Michael Salim
- Succeeded by: Mohammed Mahdi al-Bayati

Governor of Maysan Province
- In office 2009–2010
- Prime Minister: Nouri al-Maliki
- Preceded by: Adil Mahwadar Radi
- Succeeded by: Ali Dawai Lazem

Mayor of Amarah City
- In office 2004–2005

Personal details
- Born: 4 March 1970 (age 56) Baghdad, Iraqi Republic
- Party: Furatayn Movement (since 2019); Dawa (2003–2019)
- Other political affiliations: Reconstruction and Development Coalition (since 2025)
- Children: 4
- Education: University of Baghdad (Master's Degree)
- Profession: Politician

Mohammed Shia' Sabbar al-Sudani (Note: Arabic: محمد شياع صبار السوداني, romanized: Muḥammad Shiaʿ Sabbar al-Sūdānī) (born 4 March 1970) is an Iraqi politician and former agricultural engineer who served as the prime minister of Iraq from 2022 to 2026. Towards the end of his term, he also served temporarily as the acting minister of defence. Prior to his premiership, he held a number of ministerial positions; namely, minister of labour and social affairs, acting minister of industry and minerals, acting minister of trade, acting minister of migration and the displaced, acting minister of finance, acting minister of agriculture, and minister of human rights.

He has also held the position of governor of Maysan, and mayor of Amarah. In 2025, The Muslim 500 included him among the most influential Muslim politicians. He is a member of the Coordination Framework.

== Early life and education ==
Mohammed Shia' al-Sudani was born in Baghdad on 4 March 1970, to a middle-class Shia Arab family. Hailing originally from the province of Maysan in southern Iraq, his father worked as an employee at the Agricultural Cooperative Bank of Iraq. When Al-Sudani was around 10 years old, his father as well as five other members of his family were executed for being members of the Islamic Dawa Party, a banned party at the time that opposed the Ba'athist rule of Saddam Hussein in Iraq.

Al-Sudani graduated from the University of Baghdad and holds a bachelor's degree in agricultural science and a master's degree in project management.

== Early career ==
Before the invasion of Iraq, al-Sudani lived a modest apolitical life as an agricultural engineer. In 1997, al-Sudani joined the Maysan Agriculture Office, where he was subsequently appointed to a number of senior positions in the office such as the head of the Agriculture department, head of the Ali Al-Sharqi City Agriculture department, and head of the Agricultural Production department. He was also the supervising engineer in the National Research Program with the Food and Agriculture Organization of the United Nations.

== Political career ==
After the invasion of Iraq in 2003, al-Sudani joined the Islamic Dawa Party and worked as a coordinator between the Maysan province administration and the Coalition Provisional Authority. In 2004 he was appointed mayor of Amarah City, and in the 2005 provincial elections he was elected as a member of Maysan Provincial Council. He was re-elected in 2009 and appointed governor of Maysan.

=== Ministerial positions ===
He was appointed by Prime Minister Nouri al-Maliki as the Minister of Human Rights after the 2010 parliamentary election, being approved by parliament on 21 December 2010.

His ministry was in charge of finding mass graves in Iraq from the regime of Saddam Hussein. Two were found in 2011, one in Anbar and another in Al Diwaniyah. During 2011, he was briefly chairman of the Supreme National De-Baathification Commission/Justice and Accountability Commission for De-Ba'athification, which had the power to bar individuals from government for links to the former ruling Ba'ath Party. He coordinated with the ministry of migration to help Iraqi citizens residing in Syria to return to Iraq during the Syrian Civil War.

He was minister in August 2014 when thousands of Yazidis were massacred in northern Iraq by the Islamic State (ISIL or Daesh). He described it as "a vicious atrocity" and said it was the "responsibility of the international community to take a firm stand against the Daesh" and to "start the war on Daesh to stop genocides and atrocities against civilians". He asked the United Nations Human Rights Council to launch an investigation into crimes against civilians committed by ISIL. He described their crimes as amounting to genocide and crimes against humanity. "We are facing a terrorist monster", he explained. "Their movement must be curbed. Their assets should be frozen and confiscated. Their military capacities must be destroyed."

He was appointed minister of Labour and Social Affairs in 2014, and his post in the ministry of human rights was succeeded by Mohammed Mahdi Ameen al-Bayati in October 2014, when the government of Haider al-Abadi took office.

==== Interim ministerial positions ====
During his political career, al-Sudani has worked as the acting minister of a number of ministries: Agriculture, Finance, Migration and the Displaced, Industry and Minerals, and Trade.

=== Furatayn Movement ===
In December 2019, al-Sudani announced his departure from the Islamic Dawa Party and in January 2019, he announced the formation of the Furatayn Movement. His is a reformist-centrist party, which he said was born out of the necessity to "correct the trajectory of the State against corrupters". Furatayn Movement won one seat in 2021 Iraqi parliamentary election, which increased to 3 after mass resignation of Sadrist deputies.

== Premiership ==
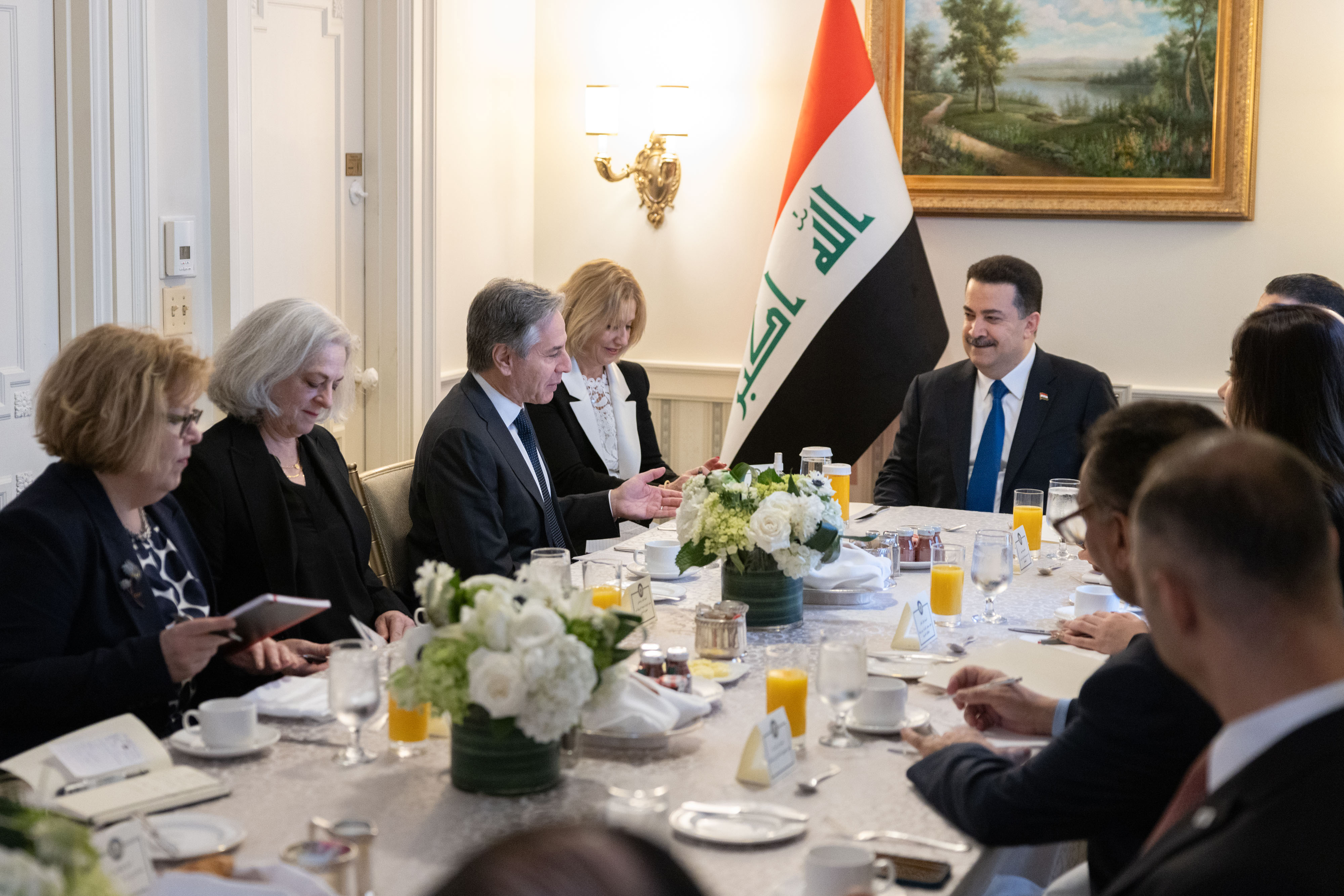
Al-Sudani with US Secretary of State Antony Blinken in April 2024

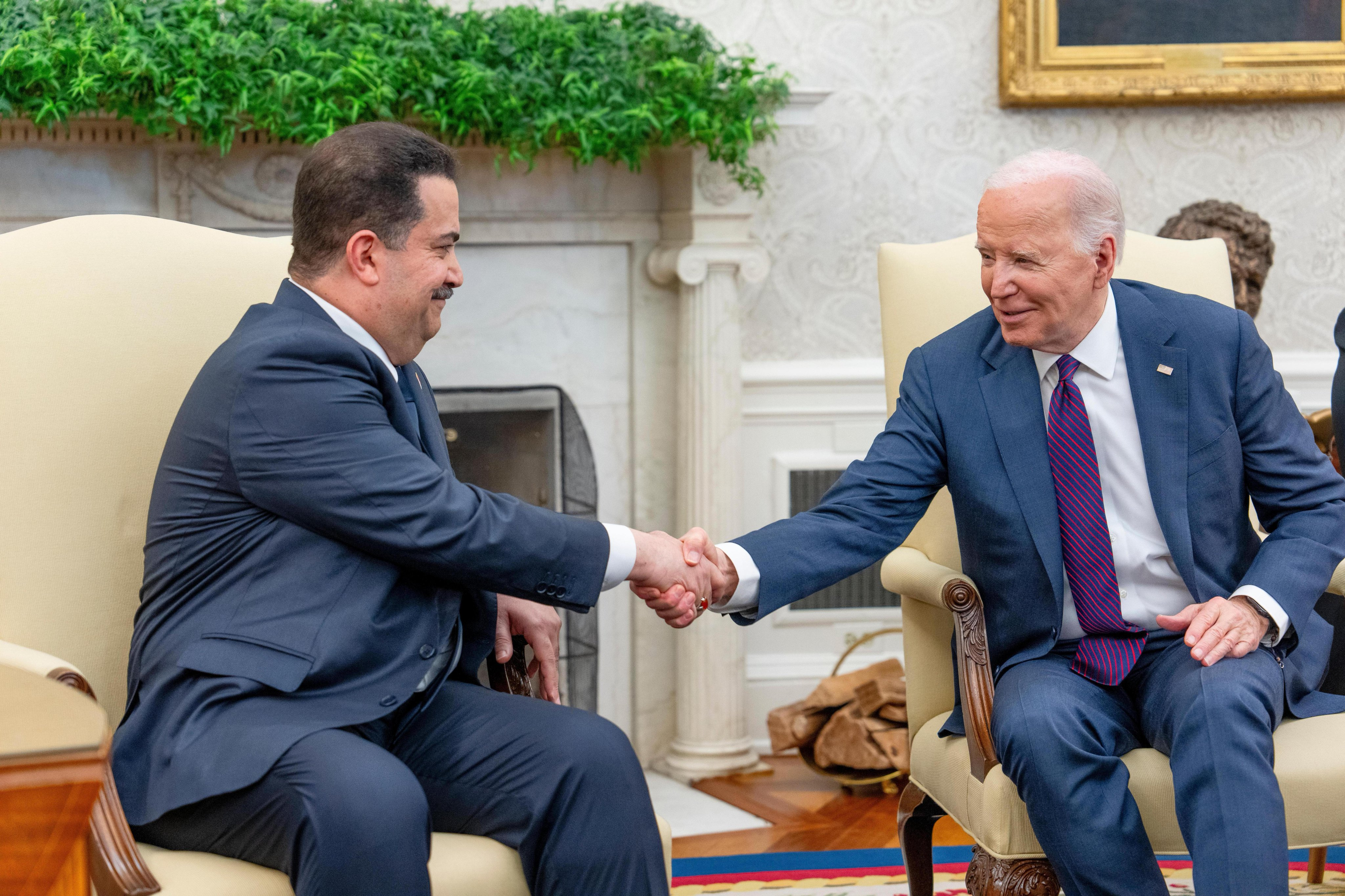
Al-Sudani with US President Joe Biden in April 2024

In a bid to end the 2022 Iraqi political crisis, the Coordination Framework officially nominated Al-Sudani for the post of prime minister in May 2022, . He succeeded in forming a government, which was approved by the Council of Representatives on 27 October.

In January 2023, in an interview with The Wall Street Journal, al-Sudani defended the presence of U.S. troops in his country and set no timetable for their withdrawal, referring to the U.S. and NATO troop contingents that train and assist Iraqi units in countering the Islamic State, but largely stay out of combat, though he mentioned that the U.S.-led military coalition in Iraq is no longer needed.

On 20 July 2023, al-Sudani expelled the Swedish ambassador to Iraq and revoked work permits for Swedish companies after Sweden permitted a planned Quran burning.

In April 2024, al-Sudani condemned the Israeli bombing of the Iranian embassy in Damascus. Also in this same month he visited the United States and met with President Joe Biden. He also received the Turkish president Recep Tayyip Erdoğan to sign the Iraq–Europe Development Road project.

In September 2024 at the United Nations General Assembly he condemned the Israeli airstrikes on Lebanon and met various leaders who discussed bilateral relations with him.

During the 2024 Syrian opposition offensives against the Assad regime, he stated that "what is happening in Syria today is in the interest of the Zionist entity Israel, which deliberately bombed Syrian Army sites in a way that paved the way for terrorist groups to control additional areas in Syria." However, he avoided intervening in the conflict on the side of Bashar al-Assad despite pressure to do so from some domestic groups.

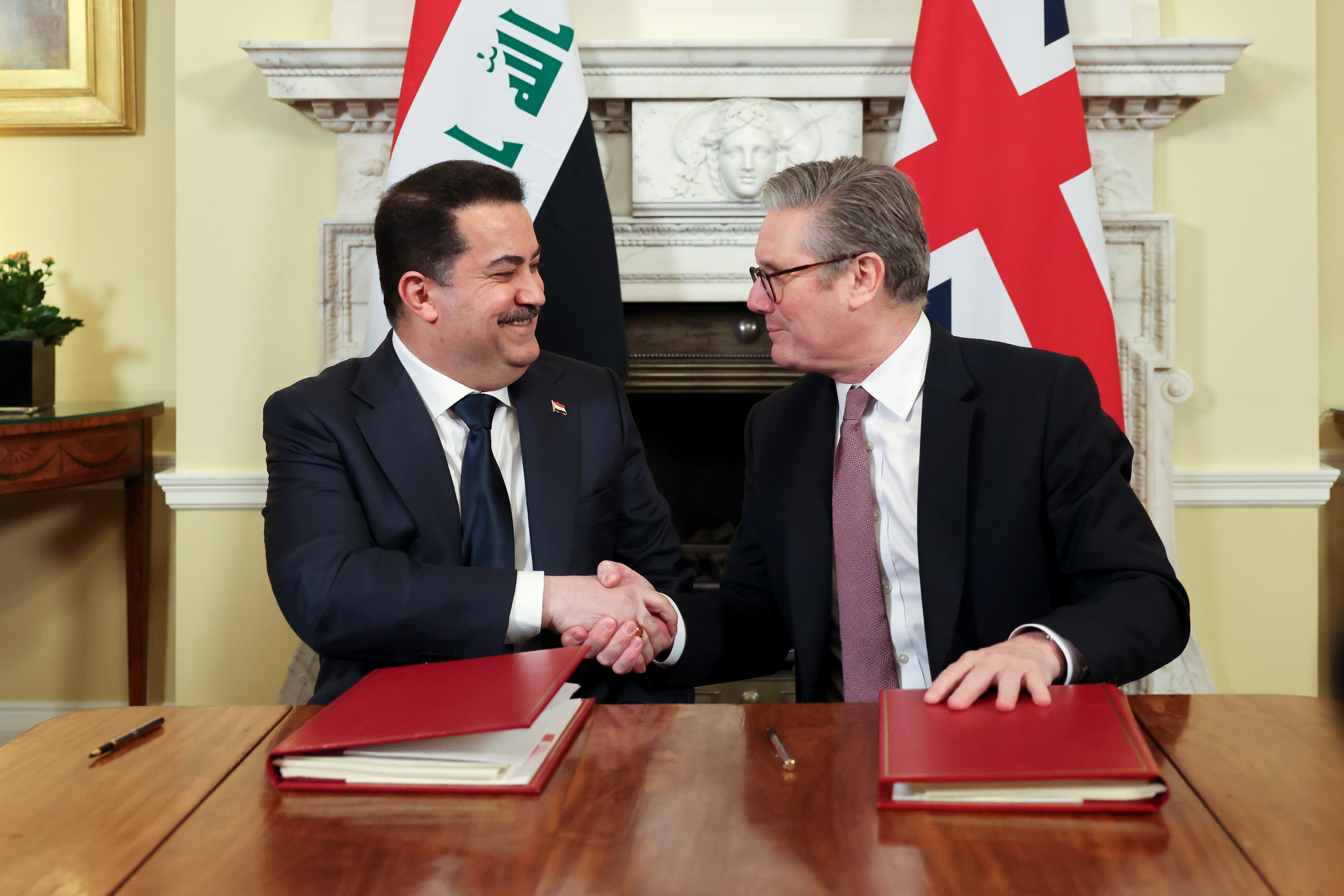
Al-Sudani with UK Prime Minister Keir Starmer in January 2025

On 29 July 2025, in an interview with The Associated Press, al-Sudani revealed that during the Twelve Day War, the Iraqi government thwarted 29 attempts by pro-Iran militias to launch drones and missiles towards Israel, stating, "we know that the (Israeli) government had a policy — and still does — of expanding the war in the region ... we made sure not to give any excuse to any party to target Iraq".

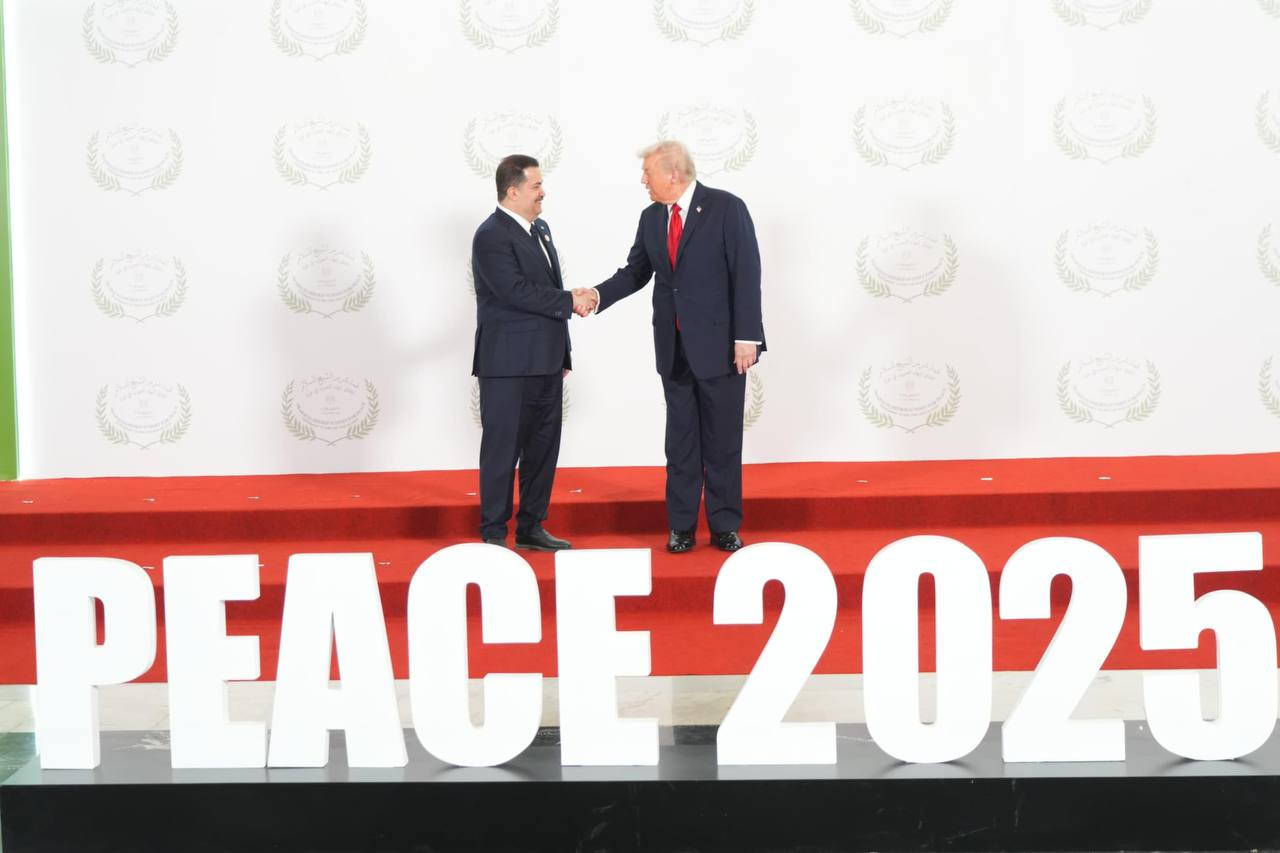
Al-Sudani and U.S. President Donald Trump at the Peace 2025 Conference.

On 9 September 2025, al-Sudani announced on Twitter that Elizabeth Tsurkov, a Russian-Israeli researcher who had been kidnapped by Kataib Hezbollah, had been released after 903 days of captivity. US State Department spokesperson stated that her release came after "a decisive partnership with [Iraqi] Prime Minister Mohammed Shia al-Sudani".

The Economist described Baghdad construction boom taking place under al-Sudani, as well as digitalisation of government services.

=== Relations with PMF and Coordination Framework ===
The Economist has said that al-Sudani is affiliated with the Popular Mobilization Forces (PMF), and his tenure has seen their influence further increase in Iraq. His government increased the number of troops for the PMF by 116,000, increasing the total number to around 230,000, and has set its budget to US$2.7 billion. It also launched a construction company affiliated with the PMF, named after killed PMF commander Abu Mahdi al-Muhandis; the company gives preferential access to government contractors and the government has awarded the company with strategic land.

Relationship with Coordination Framework, especially with Nouri al-Maliki worsened, the two becoming rivals. Al-Sudani created his own Reconstruction and Development Coalition (RDC).

On 8 August 2025, the government announced the dismissal of Kataib Hezbollah commanders within PMF, after Kataib Hezbollah stormed the agriculture ministry building.

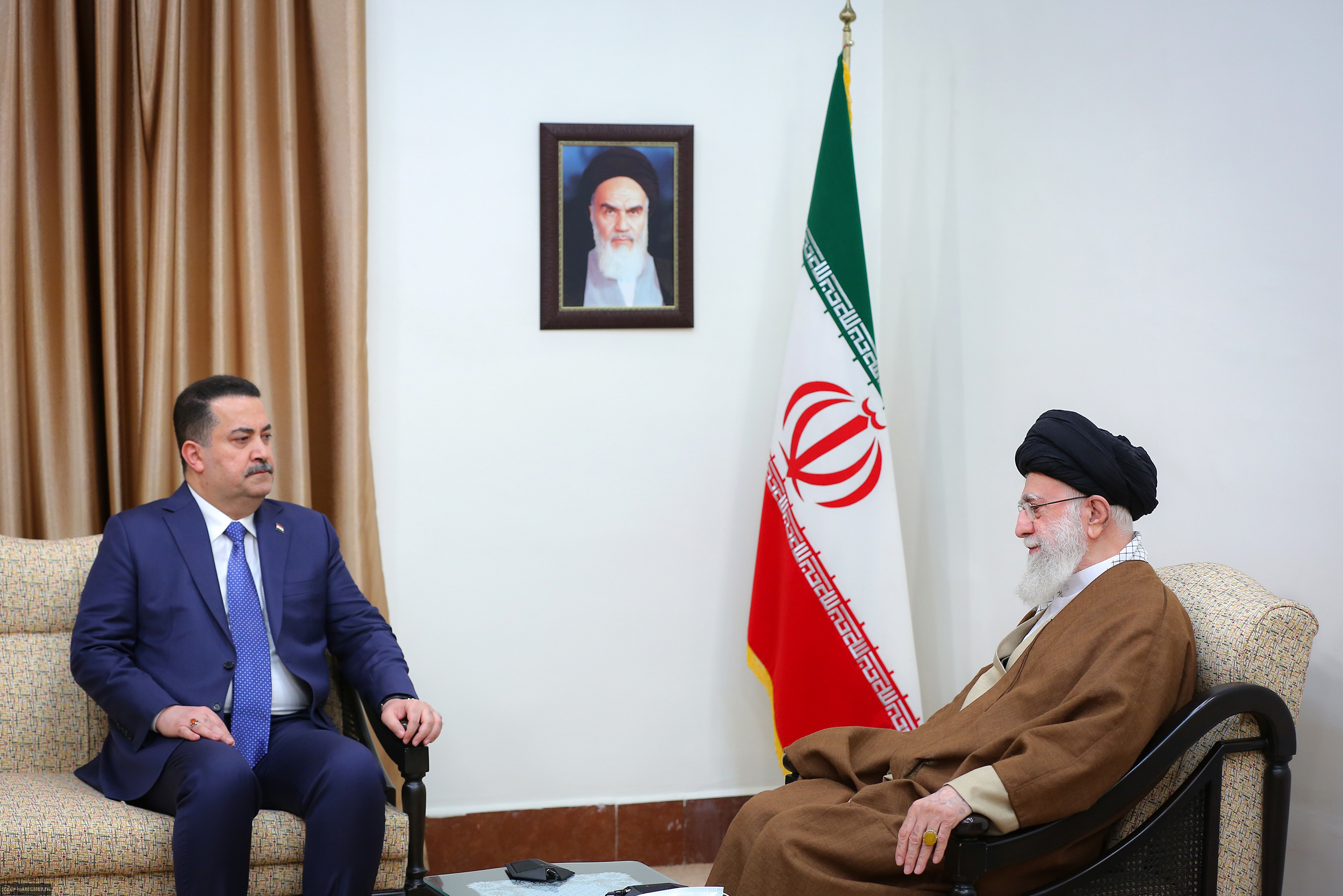
Al-Sudani with Iran's Supreme Leader Ayatollah Ali Khamenei in November 2023

=== Foreign visits ===
On 10 October 2023, al-Sudani arrived in Moscow and met with Russian president Vladimir Putin. On 21 October 2023, he called for a ceasefire in the Gaza war.

On 17 February 2024, he met with German chancellor Olaf Scholz in Munich while he was attending the Munich Security Conference where he met with various world leaders.

In May 2024, he attended the memorial ceremony for President Ebrahim Raisi, who died in a helicopter crash, in the Iranian capital, Tehran.

In April 2025, he made an unannounced visit to Qatar and met with Syrian President Ahmed al-Sharaa and Qatari Emir Tamim bin Hamad Al Thani.

=== 2025 election ===
Al-Sudani's alliance finished first in the 2025 parliamentary elections. His coalition (RDC) received the ministries of oil, agriculture and electricity in the cabinet of Ali al-Zaidi.

== Leadership ==
Al-Sudani is currently the leader of two political movements; the Furatayn Movement, which he founded on 19 January 2019, and the Reconstruction and Development Coalition, an electoral alliance which he established on 20 May 2025 to contest the 2025 parliamentary elections.

His "Iraq First" agenda has been compared to that of the U.S. President Donald Trump. Newsweek drew parallels between Trump's MAGA slogan and al-Sudani's leadership, describing the latter as a man who wants to "Make Iraq Great Again". During his tenure, al-Sudani has repeatedly emphasized the importance of strong Iraq–United States relations.

== Personal life ==
Al-Sudani is married and has four sons. His firstborn, Mustafa (born 2001), has a son named Mohammed.
