= Abdul Mahdi Government =

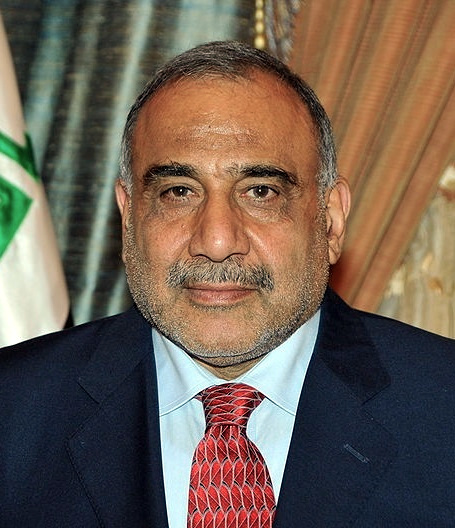
Adil Abdul Mahdi, the head of government

The Abdul Mahdi government was the government of Iraq, headed by Prime Minister Adil Abdul-Mahdi. It was approved by the Council of Representatives on 24 October 2018 and followed a general election in May 2018. The United Nations described the formation as an "exemplary peaceful transfer of power".

== Background ==
The general election in May 2018 returned the most divided parliament since the invasion of Iraq in 2003. The most successful coalition was Marching Towards Reform (Saairun), whose principle components were Sadrists – followers of the nationalist cleric Muqtada al-Sadr, whose support comes mainly from Shi'a poor – and the leftist Iraqi Communist Party. They gained 54 seats – just 16% of the total. Other significant parties were the Fatah Alliance with 47 – formed by leading members of the Popular Mobilization Forces (Al-Hashd al-Sha'abi), who had taken a leading role in the fight to defeat the Islamic State of Iraq and the Levant, who took control of much of Iraq in 2014 – and the Victory Alliance (42) of Prime Minister Haider al-Abadi. The Kurdistan Democratic Party and the State of Law party of former Prime Minister Nouri al-Maliki both won 25 seats.

Government formation was delayed due to widespread complaints of electoral fraud associated with the electronic voting machines. The outgoing parliament ordered a manual recount, supervised by the courts. This was appealed to the Supreme Court, which ordered a recount on June 21. The final results were announced on August 9 – nearly three months after the vote – starting the constitutional process to form a new government.

Parliament convened on 3 September, but were unable to elect a speaker due to rivalries between two blocs who both claimed to be the largest coalition, entitled to nominate the Prime Minister. Al-Abadi presented an alliance with Saairun, Wataniya, Hikma and other smaller lists who between then held a majority of seats. However, Fatah also claimed to have a majority, based on an alliance with State of Law and with members of Abadi's coalition who had defected. Two weeks later parliament reconvened and elected a speaker in a secret ballot, with candidates from each of the rival blocs. Muhammad al-Halbusi, backed by Fatah was elected.

At the same time, violent protests occurred in Basra and other cities in the south over polluted water – which had hospitalised tens of thousands of people – and the lack of reliable electricity. Religious leaders called for a new Prime Minister who hadn't been in government before. Abadi announced on 13 September 2018 that he would respect this call and not run for a second term as prime minister.

The vote for the President took place on 2 October. Previously, the president had always been a member of the second-largest Kurdish party, the Patriotic Union of Kurdistan, under an agreement with the Kurdistan Democratic Party whereby the KDP would be president of Iraqi Kurdistan. However, the KDP fielded a separate candidate, Fuad Hussein, insisting that they had the right to the Presidency as the largest party. Both candidates went to a vote in the parliament, with the PUK's Barham Salih winning. He immediately nominated independent Shi'ite Adel Abdul Mahdi, a former oil minister seen as acceptable to all parties and to both Iran and the United States, as Prime Minister-designate.

Abdul Mahdi invited people to apply to a new online website if they wanted to be a minister, in a bid to bring in new faces and appoint a cabinet of technocrats. He also asked for parties to nominate multiple candidates for the ministries so that he could choose the best candidate among them. He presented his 22 ministers to parliament on 26 October – none of whom had come through the online applications. Fourteen candidates were approved, but parliament refused to vote on 8 candidates. The session was delayed until 8 November, with Abdul Mahdi filling the posts personally on a temporary basis. The candidates not voted on were:

1. Hassan al-Rubaie, a commander of the Asa'ib Ahl al-Haq militia, nominated Culture Minister;
2. Faisal al-Jarba, an air force pilot, nominated Defense Minister
3. Faleh al-Fayyad, head of the Hashd al-Shaabi, nominated Interior Minister

Hassan al-Rubaie withdrew his candidacy on 12 November.

Three further ministers were approved on 18 December, after Fatah and Saairun agreed to have a vote on the ministries "not shrouded in disagreements" – a reference to the on-going controversy with the Interior and Defence Minister nominations. The Ministers of Planning, Higher Education and Culture were confirmed, with the Ministers of Education and Displacement not receiving enough votes. Ministers of Education and Displacement were approved in a session on 24 December but when al-Fayyad was proposed again for Interior Minister, Saairun walked out denying parliament its quorum.

== Members ==
Portfolio	Website	Minister	Coalition	Party	Dates
Prime Minister		Adil Abdul-Mahdi		none	24 October 2018
Sovereign Ministries
Interior Minister	www.moi.gov.iq	Yassin al-Yasiri		National Wisdom Movement	24 June 2019
Finance Minister	www.mof.gov.iq	Fuad Hussein	Kurdistan Democratic Party	Kurdistan Democratic Party	24 October 2018
Foreign Minister	www.mofa.gov.iq	Mohamed Ali Alhakim	none	none	24 October 2018
Defense Minister	www.mod.mil.iq	Najah al-Shammari	al-Wataniya		24 June 2019
Oil Minister	www.oil.gov.iq	Thamir Ghadhban	none	none	24 October 2018
Other Ministries
Agriculture Minister		Salih al-Hassani		none	24 October 2018
Communications Minister	www.nmc.gov.iq	Naim al-Rubaye	independent		24 October 2018
Culture Minister	http://www.mocul.gov.iq/	Abdulameer al-Hamdani			18 December 2018
Housing & Reconstruction Minister	www.moch.gov.iq	Bangin Rekani	Kurdistan Democratic Party	Kurdistan Democratic Party	24 October 2018
Electricity Minister	www.moelc.gov.iq	Luay al-Khatteeb		none	24 October 2018
Education Minister		Suha Khalil Al-Ali Beg			24 December 2018
Health Minister	www.moh.gov.iq	Alaa Al-Awani			24 October 2018
Higher Education Minister		Qusay al-Suhail		Sadrist Movement	18 December 2018
Industry & Minerals Minister	www.industry.gov.iq	Abdullah al-Jubouri		none	24 October 2018
Labour & Social Affairs Minister	www.molsa.gov.iq	Bassem al-Rubaye		none	24 October 2018
Migration Minister		Nawfal Moussa			24 December 2018
Planning Minister		Nuri al-Dulaimi		Iraqi Islamic Party	18 December 2018
Trade Minister	www.mot.gov.iq	Mohammad Hashim		none	24 October 2018
Transport Minister	www.motrans.gov.iq	Abdullah Luaibi		none	24 October 2018
Water Resources Minister	www.mowr.gov.iq	Jamal al-Adil		none	24 October 2018
Youth & Sport Minister	www.moys.gov.iq	Ahmed Obeidi		none	24 October 2018

Preceded by Al Abadi Government	Abdul Mahdi Government; 24 October 2018 – 7 May 2020	Succeeded by Al-Kadhimi Government
