= Naim al-Rubaye =

Iraqi minister, politician, professor (born 1970)

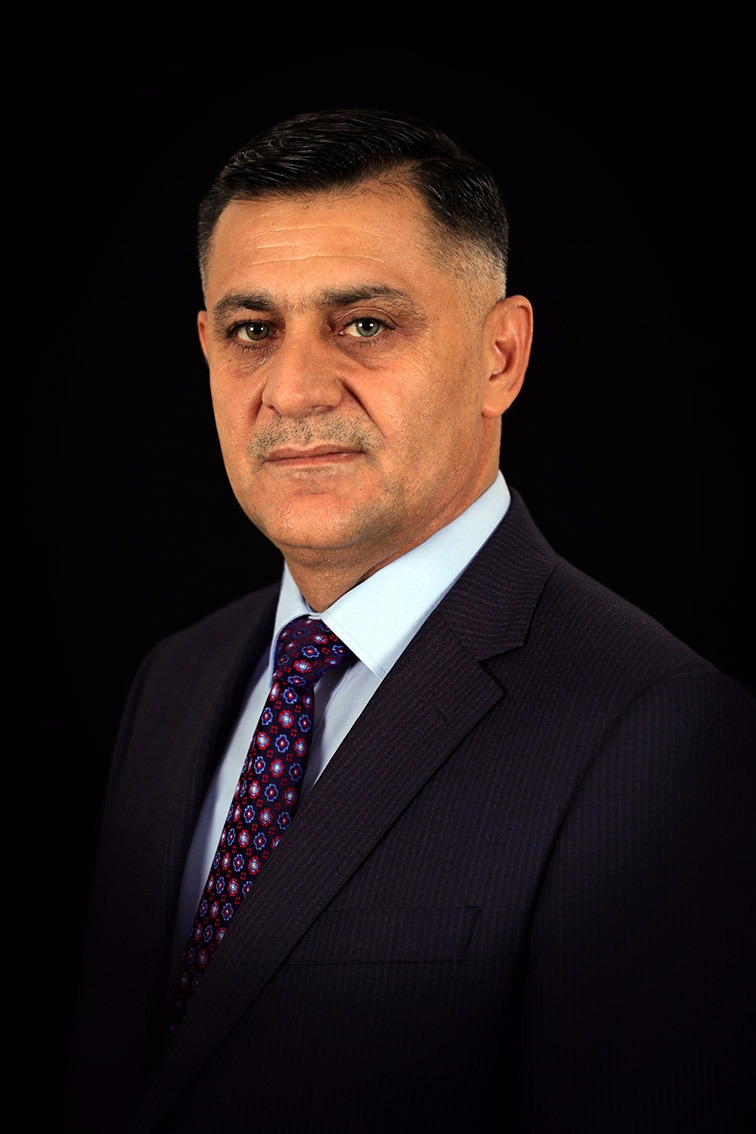

Minister of Communications
- In office 25 October 2018 – 7 May 2020
- Prime Minister: Adil Abdul-Mahdi
- Preceded by: Kazem Hassan Rashed
- Succeeded by: Arkan Shahab

Personal details
- Born: 1970 (age 55–56)
- Citizenship: Iraq
- Party: Independent
- Education: Hacettepe University (PhD)
- Occupation: Minister; politician; professor

Naim Thjeel Yousir Al-Rubaie (Arabic: نعيم الربيعي; born 1970) is an Iraqi independent politician who was Communications Minister from 2018 to 2020 in the Government of Adil Abdul-Mahdi. He was approved by the Council of Representatives on 24 October 2018.

He earned a PhD degree in computer engineering from Hacettepe University 2014.

Just two weeks after his approval, the Accountability and Justice Commission, which vets officials, wrote to parliament to notify them that Al-Rubaye had been a mid-level Ba'ath Party official and had been the Director of the Directorate of Information and Communication Technology – Iraqi National Intelligence Service (2015–2018).
