= Malas =

Malas may refer to:

- Malas language, a dialect of the Papuan Manep language
- Mala (caste), an ethnic group from the Indian states of Andhra Pradesh, Telangana and Karnataka

== Places ==
- Málaš, a village and municipality in Levice District, Nitra Region, Slovakia
- Malas River, a river in Papua New Guinea

== People ==
- Malas (surname)
- Malas Abdulkarim al-Kasnazani (fl. 2014–2015), Iraqi politician and government minister

== Others ==
- Malas or Buddhist prayer beads
- Malas (ayurveda), the waste products of the body in ayurveda
- Malas Compañías, a 1980 album by Spanish singer-songwriter Joaquín Sabina
- A world in the online game Ultima Online

== See also ==
- Mala (disambiguation)
