= Luay al-Khatteeb =

Iraqi politician

Luay al-Khatteeb لؤي الخطيب
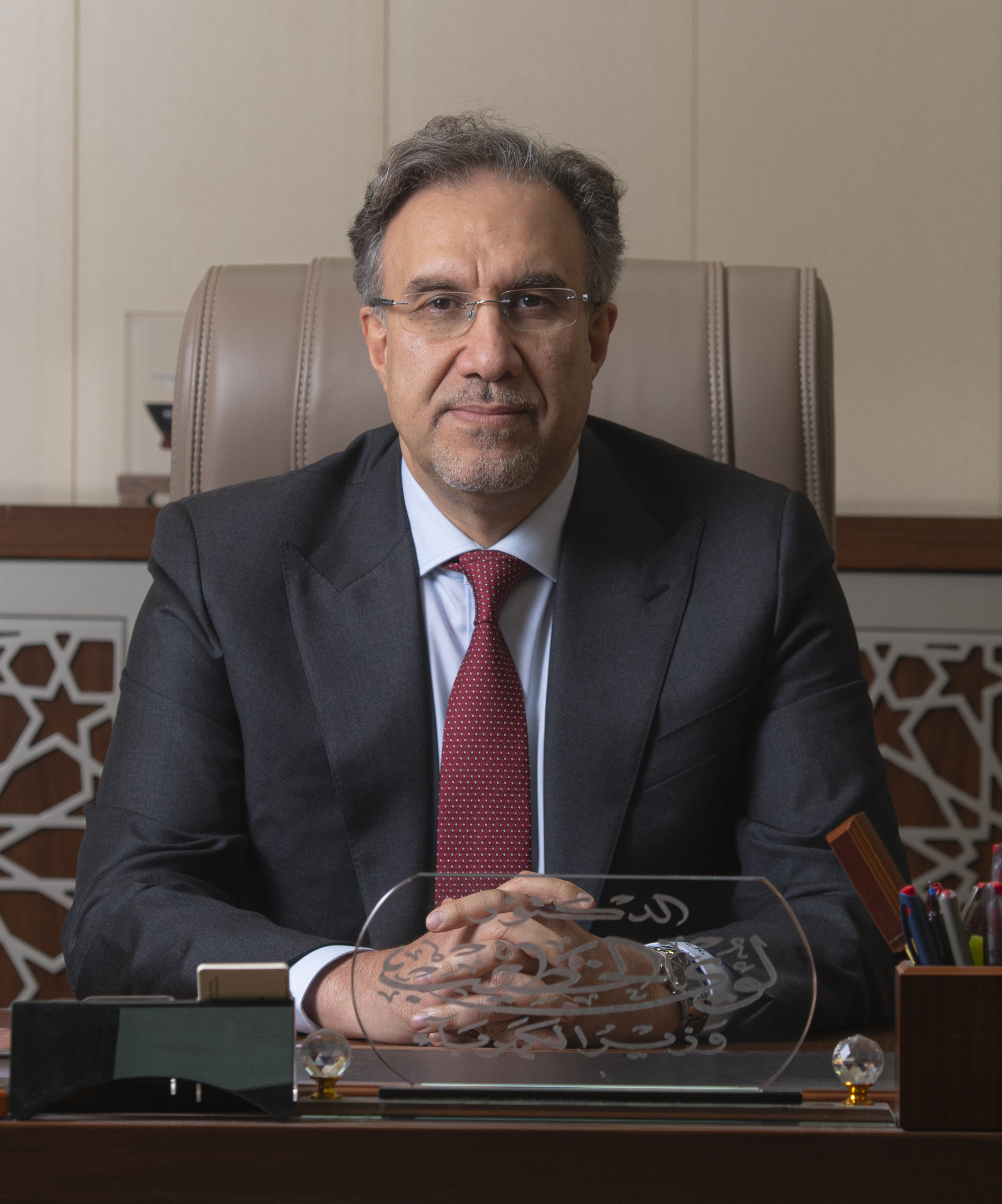

Minister of Electricity of Iraq
- In office 25 October 2018 – 6 May 2020
- Prime Minister: Adil Abdul-Mahdi
- Preceded by: Qasim Al-Fahadawi
- Succeeded by: Majid Mahdi Hantoush

Founder and Executive Director of Iraq Energy Institute
- In office 2008–2018

Personal details
- Citizenship: Iraq
- Party: Independent
- Spouse: Istabrack Jawad
- Education: Kingston University (BSc); University of Exeter (PhD)
- Website: www.alkhatteeb.org

Dr. Luay al-Khatteeb is an Iraqi independent politician who was the former Electricity Minister and member of the Federal Energy Council in the Government of Adil Abdul-Mahdi. Prior to this, he was the founding director of the Iraq Energy Institute, a think tank producing scholarship and analysis on current, historic and future energy, economy and technology trends in Iraq, as well as organizing high-level fora on energy reform in Iraq and the region.

A frequent commentator on Iraq's energy strategic policies and an advocate of sector-wide reforms, Al-Khatteeb is also a non-resident Fellow at the Center on Global Energy Policy (Columbia University-SIPA.) He has written articles and published reports for Foreign Affairs, The New York Times, Brookings Institution, Harvard University, Columbia University, The National Interest, The Huffington Post, Al-Monitor, CNN, MEES, the Petroleum-Economist and The National among many others.

Previously, he served as honorary advisor to the Federal Parliament of Iraq on Energy and Economy. Between 2014 and 2016 he was a non-resident fellow at the Brookings Institution, where he focused on the geopolitics and political economy of the GCC and Iraq.

During this time, he authored and co-authored multiple articles on oil and gas in Iraq, as well as regional politics, advocating balanced public and private sector participation in the energy sector.

Al-Khatteeb has held a number of longstanding positions on energy in Iraq and the region, being an outspoken advocate of modern gas to power strategies, eliminating gas flaring and providing feedstock for power and linked industries, particularly in Iraq.

== Early life ==
Luay al-Khatteeb was born in 1968 in Baghdad, the son of a respected Iraqi legal scholar, Hamid Jawad al-Khatteeb. His family have historically been close to the Holy Grand Marjiya of Najaf, Iraq's supreme religious authority, often playing advocacy roles for the Shia quietest clergy during Iraq's turbulent modern history.

His grandfather Jawad-Khatteeb was subsequently honored by Grand Ayatullah sayid Muhsin al-Hakim on his passing in 1963; Ayatollah al-Hakim led prayers during his funeral. Jawad-Khatteeb was buried inside the Holy Shrine of Imam Ali, next to Grand Ayatullah Abu l-Hasan al-Isfahani.

During the 1980s, Shia religious activists in Najaf were increasingly targeted by the Baath regime; as a result Luay al Khatteeb was sent by his family to seek refuge in the Kurdish region, where he lived with his sister until 1986. That year he returned to Baghdad to complete his education, where he remained until 26 June 1990. That year, political conditions finally convinced his family that it was no longer safe to remain in Iraq.

== Career and education ==
Al-Khatteeb graduated in 1994 with a degree in business information technology from Kingston University, in London, England, later becoming a researcher on the Iraq Petroleum industry, Sustainable development, and Policy Formulation project at Salford University.

Following the invasion of Iraq in 2004, he was asked by British-Dutch International Oil Company Shell to advise on the development of an exploration and production strategy for Iraq between 2004 and 2008, believing it to be a patriotic duty to help Iraq's oil sector recover from conflict. He would later go on to work at various roles assisting international oil companies to enter the Iraqi market. Returning to academia some years later, he would go on to receive a doctorate from Exeter University in political economy.

Following a period of advisory work for the Iraqi Council of Representatives (COR) on energy strategy, Al Khatteeb was approved by COR on 24 October 2018 and sworn in as Minister of Electricity. Perceived as someone unconnected to the post 2003 political elite, Al-Khatteeb was selected for the portfolio as part of an informal agreement between political parties to form a "technocratic cabinet," which would reduce political interference in government.

== Minister of Electricity ==
During his time as Minister of Electricity, Al-Khatteeb expedited the completion of a number of vital power projects in Iraq's Sunni majority provinces that had been liberated from the Islamic State, as well as finalizing new projects in liberated areas, such as the Baiji power plant. In Basra, following the electricity crisis of 2018, Al-Khatteeb became known for rallying resources to ensure substations and critical work on grid maintenance and upgrading was ready for the summer of 2019, avoiding a serious crisis of electricity provision.

On 30 April 2019, Al-Khatteeb signed an implementation agreement between Iraq's Ministry of Electricity and Siemens to pave the way for the full execution of the Iraq Roadmap, a series of power projects with a short, medium- and long-term scope of adding highly efficient power generation capacity to Iraq's ailing electricity sector. Three contracts were signed that included rehabilitation, upgrades of power generation plants, expansion of transmission and distribution networks with the first phase valued at EUR 700 million. The signing saw high level bilateral governmental support with Iraq's former Prime Minister Adil Abdul-Mahdi and Germany's Chancellor Angela Merkel attending the event in Berlin.

Under Al-Khateeb, Iraq's Ministry of Electricity developed a national roadmap that incorporated power projects by Siemens, GE, Chinese and international energy firms in addition to goals for implementing renewable energy projects. During his 18 months tenure, Iraq was at the final stages of finalising a mega deal with GE to rebuild the power grid in liberated areas and expand transmission in Western Iraq. The GE contract was worth $727 million with another $500 million contract where GE would bring 500 MW in gas-to-power streams in the provinces of Dhi Qar and Samawa. Later in August 2020, these contracts were officially concluded by his successors.

In May 2019, Iraq invited interested companies to pre-qualify for 7 utility scale solar projects in five provinces. Al-Khatteeb's strategy was for renewable energy to provide 20% of the country's power mix by 2030. He abolished the previously repressive 3.5¢/kWh Feed-In-Tariff and levelled the playing field for international energy firms to bid on Independent Power Purchasing (PPP) basis.

In September 2019, Al-Khatteeb signed a power interconnectivity agreement with the Gulf Cooperation Council Interconnection Authority (GCCIA) to import electricity from Gulf nations. The first phase was to import 500 MW via Kuwait. Part of his strategy was to make Iraq an energy hub in the region as his administration entered negotiations with Jordan, Saudi Arabia and Turkey with the aim of diversifying Iraq's electricity imports and augment regional interconnectivity.

Overall, under Al-Khatteeb's leadership, Iraq's Ministry of Electricity added approximately 3.5 GW in power capacity with the recorded peak supply increasing from 15.8 GW to 19.27 GW. In October 2019, the World Bank concluded that Iraq's non-oil sector improvement in 2019 was underpinned by better electricity production among other factors.

== Personal life ==
Dr. Luay Al-Khatteeb is married to Dr. Istabrack Jawad, a dentist and a member of the Royal College of Surgeons. Her experience includes 10 years in private practice and over 16 years as a general dental practitioner. They have 4 children.

== Key publications ==
- Natural gas in the Republic of Iraq. Published by Harvard Kennedy School Belfer Center for Science and International Affairs.
- Turn a Light On: Electricity Sector Reform in Iraq. Co-authored with Harry H. Istenpanian. Published by Brookings Doha Center.
- Struggling with low oil prices: from bad to worse in crisis-torn Iraq? Chapter in The Political and Economic Challenges of Energy in the Middle East and North Africa. Published by Routledge.
- Rising from the Ashes: natural gas in Iraq. Chapter in The Future of Gas in the Gulf: Continuity and Change. Published by The Oxford Institute for Energy Studies.
- Fixing Iraqi federalism. Published by the International Journal of Contemporary Iraqi Studies.
