= Abdullah al-Jubouri =

Iraqi politician

Saleh Abdullah al-Jubouri is an Iraqi independent politician who is the current Industry Minister in the Government of Adil Abdul-Mahdi. He was approved by the Council of Representatives on 24 October 2018.
