= Bangen Rekani =

Iraqi politician

Hon. Bangen Abdullah Rekani
- بنكين ريكاني
- Born: April 2, 1966 (age 60)
- Occupation: Politician
- Years active: 2010–present
- Known for: Minister of Construction, Housing, Municipalities, and Public Works; Deputy Minister of Transportation (2010–2014); Minister of Justice (under Adil Abdul-Mahdi government)
- Title: Minister of Construction, Housing, Municipalities, and Public Works
- Term: 2018–present
- Political party: Kurdistan Democratic Party

Bangen Abdullah Rekani (Arabic: بنكين ريكاني; Kurdish: Bengîn Rêkanî, born 2 April 1966) is an Iraqi politician from the Kurdistan Democratic Party. He is the Minister of Construction, Housing, Municipalities, and Public works since 2018. He had previously served as Minister of Justice in the Government of Adil Abdul-Mahdi.

He was approved by the Council of Representatives on 24 October 2018. Rekani was also the representative of the Kurdistan Democratic Party and the representative of Masoud Barzani, former President of the Kurdistan region. He was head of relations between the Kurdish and Iraqi political parties and the government in Baghdad.

From 2010 to 2014 he was Deputy Minister of Transportation under the second government of Nouri al-Maliki.
