= Salih al-Hassani =

Iraqi politician

Salih Hussein Jabr al-Hassani is an Iraqi independent politician who is the current Agriculture Minister in the Government of Adil Abdul-Mahdi.

He was approved by the Council of Representatives on 24 October 2018.
