= Ahmed Obeidi =

Iraqi politician

Ahmed Riad Obeidi is an Iraqi independent politician and a former Youth & Sport Minister in the Government of Adil Abdul-Mahdi. He was proposed by the al-Hal movement and approved by the Council of Representatives on 24 October 2018.

Just two weeks after his approval, the Accountability and Justice Commission, which vets officials, wrote to parliament to notify them that they had concerns about Obedi. There were claims that he was a senior leader of the Islamic State of Iraq and the Levant.
