= Hussain al-Shahristani =

Iraqi politician

Hussain Al-Shahristani
- حسين الشهرستاني
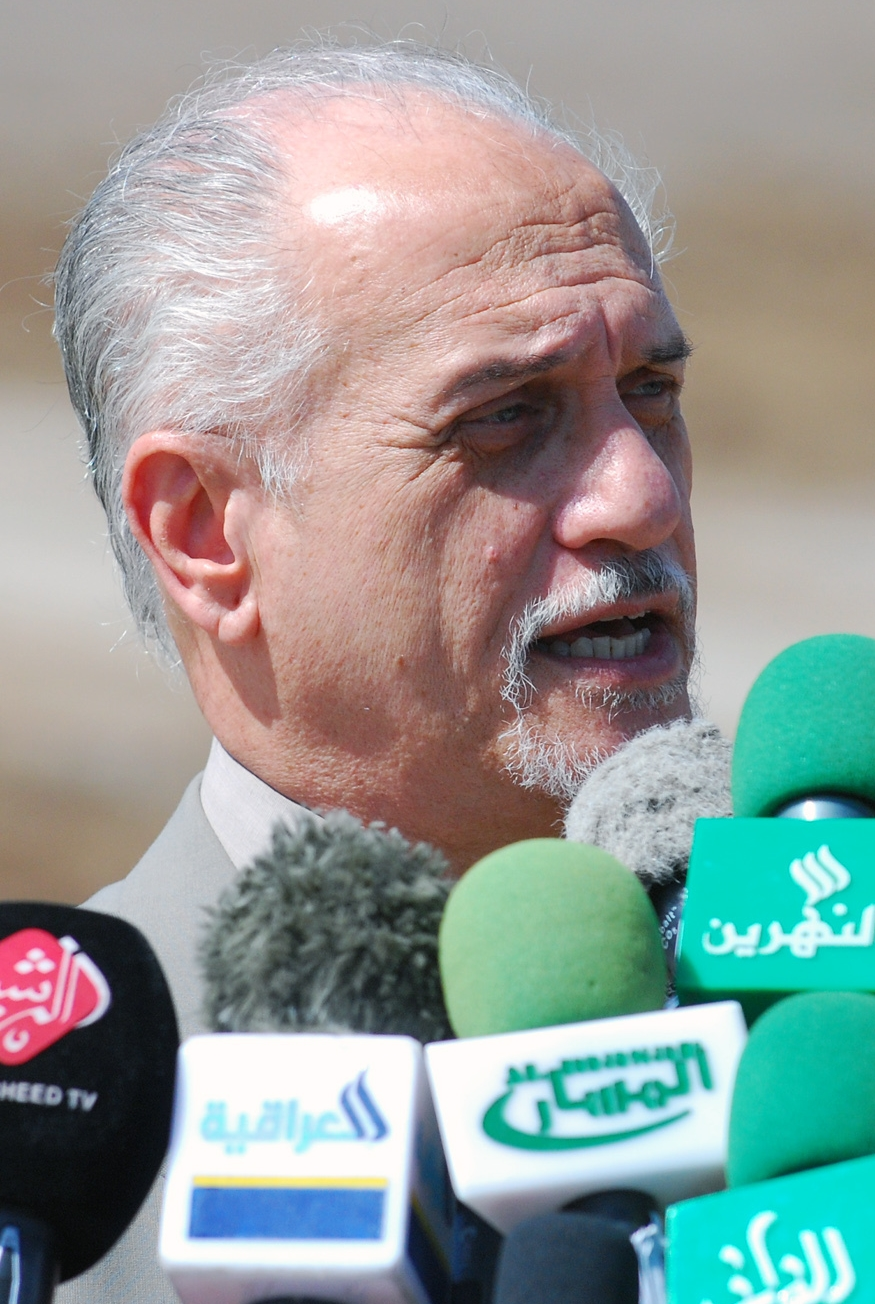
- Shahristani in 2009

Minister of Higher Education and Scientific Research
- In office 8 September 2014 – 15 August 2016
- Prime Minister: Haider al-Abadi
- Preceded by: Ali al-Adeeb
- Succeeded by: Abdul Razzaq al-Issa

Deputy Prime Minister of Iraq
- In office 21 December 2010 – 8 September 2014 Serving with Saleh al-Mutlaq and Rowsch Shaways
- Prime Minister: Nouri al-Maliki
- Preceded by: Barham Salih; Salam al-Zobaie; Raffie al-Issawi
- Succeeded by: Hoshyar Zebari

Acting Minister of Foreign Affairs
- In office 11 July 2014 – 8 September 2014
- Prime Minister: Nouri al-Maliki
- Preceded by: Hoshyar Zebari
- Succeeded by: Ibrahim al-Jaafari

Minister of Oil
- In office 20 May 2006 – 21 December 2010
- Prime Minister: Nouri al-Maliki
- Preceded by: Ibrahim Bahr al-Uloum
- Succeeded by: Abdul Karim Luaibi

Personal details
- Born: Hussain Ibrahim Saleh al-Shahristani; 1942 (age 83–84) Karbala, Iraq
- Party: State of Law Coalition
- Education: Imperial College London; University of Toronto

Hussain Ibrahim Saleh al-Shahristani (Note: Arabic: حسين إبراهيم صالح الشهرستاني) (born 1942) is an Iraqi politician who served in different cabinet posts, including as Iraq's minister of oil and minister of higher education.

== Early life and education ==
Hussain Ibrahim Saleh al-Shahristani was born in 1942 in Karbala, Iraq. He hails from the al-Shahristani family, a well-known Shia clerical family. In addition to his native Arabic he has strong command of English and Persian as second languages. Shahristani showed an exceptional aptitude for science in Secondary School.

He earned a BSc in chemical engineering from Imperial College London in 1965, and an MSc from the University of Toronto in 1967, from where he also received a PhD in chemical engineering in 1970. He specialised in the design and building of nuclear reactors. Part of his education was also in Russia.

== Career ==
He was tipped to be the Iraqi Prime Minister during the 2004 discussions, a position which he refused to take it and stated "I have always concentrated on serving the people and providing them with their basic needs, rather than party politics."

A senior member of the State of Law alliance, he was previously the deputy speaker of the Iraqi National Assembly under the Iraqi Transitional Government and was considered for the post of prime minister in both the current government and the interim government.

He was appointed oil minister in May 2006 after the withdrawal of the Islamic Virtue Party Minister, which was also a Shia from the government coalition. By August, however, he was under pressure as there was a fuel crisis.

In December 2012 he was named the head of the committee responsible for receiving and addressing the demands of the demonstrators. He has made some significant achievements in period of December 2012 to February 2013.

From 2006 to 2010, Shahristani was Iraq's minister of oil, and he served as acting minister of electricity in 2010.

Before his arrest and imprisonment Shahristani served as Chief Scientific Advisor to the Iraqi Atomic Energy Commission. Prior to that, he was a lecturer at Mosul University (1973), an assistant professor at Baghdad University (1974), Chief of Baghdad University's Radioisotope Production Department from 1975 to 1977, and Chief of the Nuclear Chemistry Department from 1977 to 1979.

He is recognised as the architect of Iraq's oil future and during his time Iraq oil output reached a 20-year high.

He was tipped by analysts close to decision makers in Iraq as a serious contender for the PM position in 2014. On 11 July 2014 he assumed the role of acting foreign minister in addition to his deputy prime ministership, after Kurdish politicians including former Foreign Minister Hoshiyar Zebari withdrew from the government of Prime Minister Nouri al-Maliki.

== Imprisonment ==
Former government officials, including Khidir Hamza his successor, have claimed Hussain al-Shahristani was imprisoned for his refusal to cooperate with Saddam's WMD program and his intentions to build nuclear weapons. He was imprisoned personally by Saddam Hussein and was threatened directly by him too. "While imprisoned and tortured at Abu Ghraib prison for 11 years under Saddam Hussein he refused to help build a nuclear weapon for the country."

He was later sentenced to death in an effort to terrorize him but the sentence was reduced to lifetime imprisonment as the regime always hoped it could benefit from his skills and expertise one day—a false hope which never materialized for Saddam's regime. He was put in a solitary confinement prison cell for 8 years and was not allowed to make any communication with his family or the outside world during that period.

In his memoir, Escaping to Freedom, he mentions that "the sound of a defective neon light was the highlight of his time during that period since silence was all he could listen to". He could not have a conversation even with his prison guards and food was passed to him through the gap under the prison cell's door. He escaped from Abu Ghraib during the 1991 Gulf War and went to Iran, where he left for UK. He obtained his freedom in an extremely daring 'Hollywood' style escape plan which was conceived, orchestrated and implemented by him. He went on to set up humanitarian aid organisations for the millions of Iraqi refugees during the Saddam era.

Having spent more than a decade (1979–1991) as a political prisoner in the infamous Abu Ghraib prison under the regime of Saddam, he escaped during an allied bombing raid on Baghdad during the First Gulf War. H.E. al-Shahristani fled to Iran where he served as head of the Gulf War Victims Organization from 1991 to 1995. He later continued his support for the victims of Saddams's regime and the Gulf War as head of the Iraqi Political Prisoners Union (2003) and as Chief of the Iraqi Refugees Relief Committee (1998–2003).

== Other positions ==
Shahristani was a visiting professor at the University of Surrey United Kingdom.

In 2004, he taught as a professor at Baghdad University, and from 2002 to 2004 he was concurrently a visiting professor at Surrey University in the United Kingdom. In 2003 he was head of the Iraqi National Academy of Sciences, and prior to his role there, from 1998 to 2002 was an advisor to the International Technical Research Centre, London, United Kingdom.

== Awards ==
Shahristani was awarded Roosevelt Freedom from Fear Award 2012. In a video of the award on YouTube Prof. al-Shahristani was presented the award by Maria van der Hoeven, executive director of the International Energy Agency IEA.

In his speech during the award ceremony he said "I confronted my fear in December 1979 when I had to make a choice: either to work on Saddam’s nuclear weapon program, or pay a price. The choice was simple, and the price turned out to be 11 years and 3 months in prison."

== Conversation with Saddam's half-brother ==
After seven months in jail, Shahristani was taken in front of Saddam's half-brother, Barzan al-Tikriti, who offered to free him if he would work on Iraq's secret nuclear weapons programme. "Anybody who refuses to serve his country does not deserve to be alive," Shahristani quoted Tikriti as telling him.

"I agree with you that the person must serve his country but what you are asking me is not a service to the country," Shahristani replied, he said in his book Escaping to Freedom (1999). He was eventually sentenced to 20 years and spent 11 in prison, some in solitary confinement.

== Reaction to Saddam's trial ==
"This is the day that the Iraqis have been waiting for. There are tens of thousands, hundreds of thousands of families who have lost their dear ones. They have been waiting for justice to be executed, and I think that Iraqis have received the news that they've been waiting for too many years."

== Notes ==
Political offices
Preceded by Ahmed Chalabi	Minister of Oil; 2006–2010	Succeeded by Abdul Karim Al Luaibi
Preceded by Barham Salih	Deputy Prime Minister for Oil; 2010–2014	Succeeded by Hoshyar Zebari
Preceded by Hoshyar Zebari	Minister of Foreign Affairs; 2014	Succeeded by Ibrahim al-Jaafari
Preceded by Mohammad Al Jabouri	Ministry of Higher Education and Scientific Research; 2014–2016	Succeeded by Abdul Razzaq al-Issa
