= Muhammad Hashim =

Muhammad Hashim may refer to:

- Muhammad (c. 570–632), Arab prophet
- Muhammad Hashim Gazdar (1893–1968), Pakistani politician
- Mohammad Hashim, Iraqi politician
