= Taif Sami Mohammed =

Iraqi politician

- طيف سامي محمد
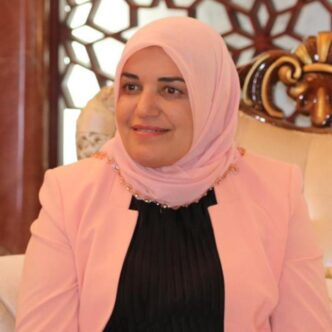
- Taif Sami in 2022

Minister of Finance
- In office 27 October 2022 – 4 July 2026
- Prime Minister: Mohammed Shia' Al Sudani
- Preceded by: Ali Allawi
- Succeeded by: Falih al-Sari

Personal details
- Born: 1963 (age 62–63) Baghdad, Iraq
- Party: Non-partisan
- Education: University of Baghdad (Bachelor's degree)
- Awards: International Women of Courage Award (2022)

Taif Sami Mohammed al-Shakarchi (Arabic: طيف سامي محمد الشكرجي) is an Iraqi politician who served as the minister of finance from 2022 to 2026. A career bureaucrat nicknamed "Iron Woman", she was at one point described as being "in the forefront in preventing and deterring budget corruption in Iraq". She was awarded the U.S. Secretary of State's International Women of Courage Award in 2022. In 2026 she was implicated in a major corruption scandal herself.

== Early life and education ==
Al-Shakarchi was born in 1963 in Baghdad. She received a bachelor's degree in economics from the University of Baghdad in 1985. In 1990, she received a diploma from the Arab Planning Institute based in Kuwait.

== Career ==
Al-Shakarchi began working in the Ministry of Finance in 1985, starting in budget analysis and eventually working her way up to the position of Deputy Director General of the Budget Department. In 2005 she became the Director General of the Budget Department, and eventually the Deputy Minister of Finance. In October 2022, she was named Minister of Finance during the premiership of Mohammed Shia al-Sudani.

== Visa revocation and FBI terror watchlist ==
On 28 August 2026, the U.S. Department of State announced that it had revoked Al-Shakarchi's U.S. visa following her placement on the Federal Bureau of Investigation's terror watchlist. Assistant Secretary of State for Global Public Affairs Dylan Johnson stated that Al-Shakarchi was no longer present in the United States at the time of the announcement. No specific evidence or criminal charges were publicly disclosed in connection with the watchlist designation.

The development marked a dramatic reversal in her standing with Washington. In the preceding year, Republican members of Congress had accused her of facilitating terrorist financing through Iraq's financial system and urged the Trump administration to take action against her.

Separately, an Iraqi court had summoned Al-Shakarchi in August 2025 as part of a broader domestic corruption investigation into former senior government officials, and she was reported to have been outside Iraq at the time.
