= Abdullah Luaibi =

Iraqi politician

Abdullah Luaibi is an Iraqi independent politician who was the transport minister in the Government of Adil Abdul-Mahdi.

He was approved by the Council of Representatives on 24 October 2018.
