= Abdul Razzaq al-Issa =

Iraqi politician

- عبد الرزاق العيسى
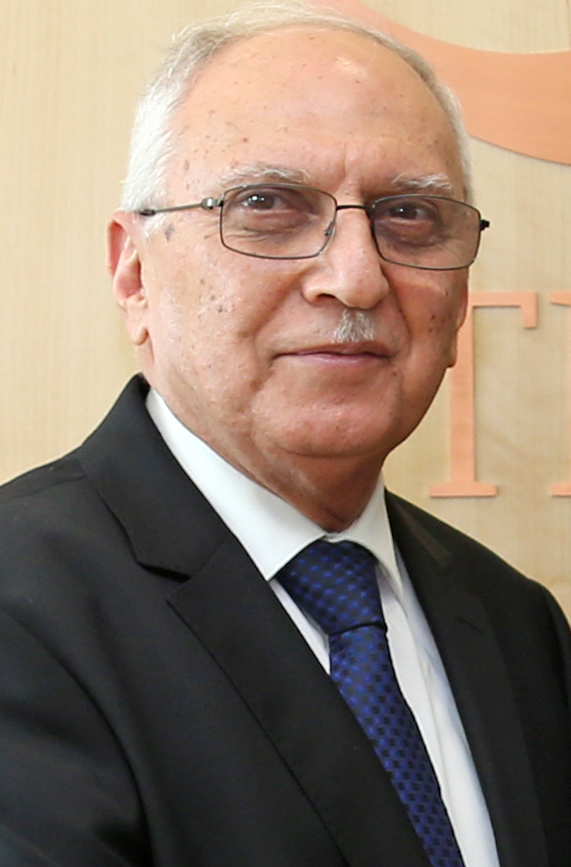
- Abdul Razzaq al-Issa in 2018

Minister of Higher Education and Scientific Research
- In office 15 August 2016 – 25 October 2018
- Prime Minister: Haider al-Abadi
- Preceded by: Hussain al-Shahristani
- Succeeded by: Jamal al-Adil

Minister of Finance Acting
- In office 21 September 2016 – 25 October 2018
- Prime Minister: Haider al-Abadi
- Preceded by: Hoshyar Zebari
- Succeeded by: Fuad Hussein

Personal details
- Born: Abdul Razzaq Abdul Jalel al-Issa; July 1, 1949 (age 77) Najaf, Iraq
- Education: University of Basrah; University of Liverpool

Abdul Razzaq Abdul Jalel al-Issa (Arabic:عبد الرزاق العيسى) (born 1 July 1949) is an Iraqi politician who served in different cabinet posts. He was recently Iraq's Minister of Higher Education.

== Early life and education ==
al-Issa was born in 1949 in Najaf, Iraq. He studied chemistry at the University of Basra in 1971 and received his doctorate from University of Liverpool in 1979. He served as president of the University of Kufa from 2006 until 2011 and in 2015 became a consultant to the Minister of Higher Education "Hussain al-Shahristani". In April 2016, Minister Haider al-Abadi to the government of technocrats to assume the post of Ministry of Higher Education and in August 2016 was approved in the Iraqi parliament to take office.

Political offices
Preceded by Hussain al-Shahristani	Ministry of Higher Education and Scientific Research; 2016–2018	Succeeded by Jamal al-Adil
