= Fuad Hussein =

Iraqi politician (born 1949)

- فؤاد حسين فوئاد حوسێن
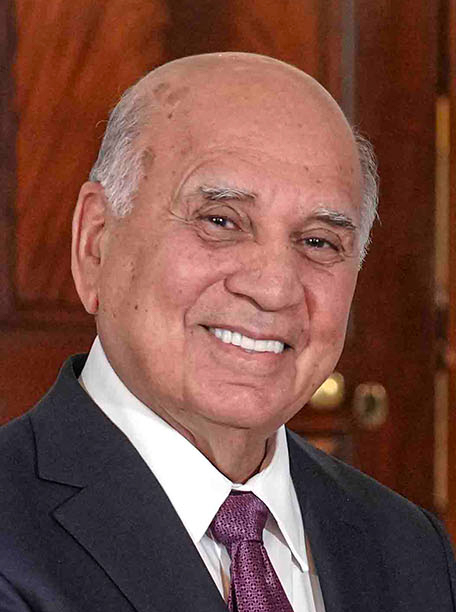
- Hussein in 2025

Minister of Foreign Affairs
- Incumbent
- Assumed office 6 June 2020
- Prime Minister: Mustafa Al-Kadhimi; Mohammed Shia' Al Sudani; Ali al-Zaidi
- Preceded by: Mustafa Al-Kadhimi (acting)

Deputy Prime Minister of Iraq
- In office 6 June 2020 – 14 May 2026
- President: Nizar Amidi; Abdul Latif Rashid; Barham Salih
- Prime Minister: Ali al-Zaidi; Mohammed Shia' al-Sudani; Mustafa Al-Kadhimi
- In office 24 October 2018 – 7 March 2020
- President: Barham Salih
- Prime Minister: Adil Abdul-Mahdi

Minister of Finance
- In office 25 October 2018 – 7 May 2020
- Prime Minister: Adil Abdul-Mahdi
- Preceded by: Abdul Razzaq al-Issa
- Succeeded by: Ali Allawi

Chief of Staff President of Iraqi Kurdistan
- In office 14 June 2005 – 1 November 2017
- President: Masoud Barzani
- Succeeded by: Vacant

Personal details
- Born: 1 July 1949 (age 77) Khanaqin, Kingdom of Iraq
- Party: Kurdistan Democratic (1966–1974, since 1983); Patriotic Union of Kurdistan (1974–1983)
- Education: University of Baghdad

Fuad Mohammed Hussein (Arabic: فؤاد محمد حسين; Sorani Kurdish: فوئاد حوسێن; born July 1, 1949) is an Iraqi politician from the Kurdistan Democratic Party who is the current minister of foreign affairs. He was previously the minister of finance in the Government of Adil Abdul-Mahdi.

== Background ==
Hussein was born in Khanaqin, a city in Diyala Province, Iraq, in 1946. He is Feyli Kurdish, Shia Muslim and married to a Dutch woman. He moved to Baghdad in 1967 and graduated from Baghdad University in 1971 with a degree in English literature. While in Baghdad he joined the Kurdish Student Union and then the Kurdistan Democratic Party. In 1975, after the Kurdish defeat in the Second Iraqi–Kurdish War, Hussein moved to the Netherlands, where he attained a Bachelor's and Master's degree in international relations from Vrije Universiteit Amsterdam. He led the Kurdish students union abroad from 1976 and became the deputy head of the Kurdish Institute in Paris in 1987. He married a Dutch woman while in the Netherlands.

He speaks fluent Kurdish, Arabic, Dutch and English. After the removal of Saddam Hussein, he was an adviser to the Ministry of Education and was in charge of designing a new educational curriculum.

It was reported that Iraqi Deputy Prime Minister and Minister of Finance Fuad Hussein held a meeting with Turkish Treasury and Finance Minister Berat Albayrak on the development of economic relations between Iraq and Turkey at the 49th World Economic Forum (WEF) summit held in Davos, Switzerland in 2019.

== Politics ==
He was appointed as Chief of Staff of Masoud Barzani, the President of the Kurdistan Regional Government. In September 2018, the Kurdistan Democratic Party nominated him to be President of Iraq. Under the Iraqi political tradition of muḥāṣaṣah, the presidency was reserved for a Kurd. The KDP claimed the right as the largest Kurdish political party in the May general election to nominate their candidate. The Patriotic Union of Kurdistan also nominated a candidate, Barham Salih, and the two parties were unable to agree a consensus. This meant that the decision went to a secret ballot of the newly elected MPs in the Council of Representatives—a first since the invasion of Iraq. Salih won the election with 219 votes to 22.

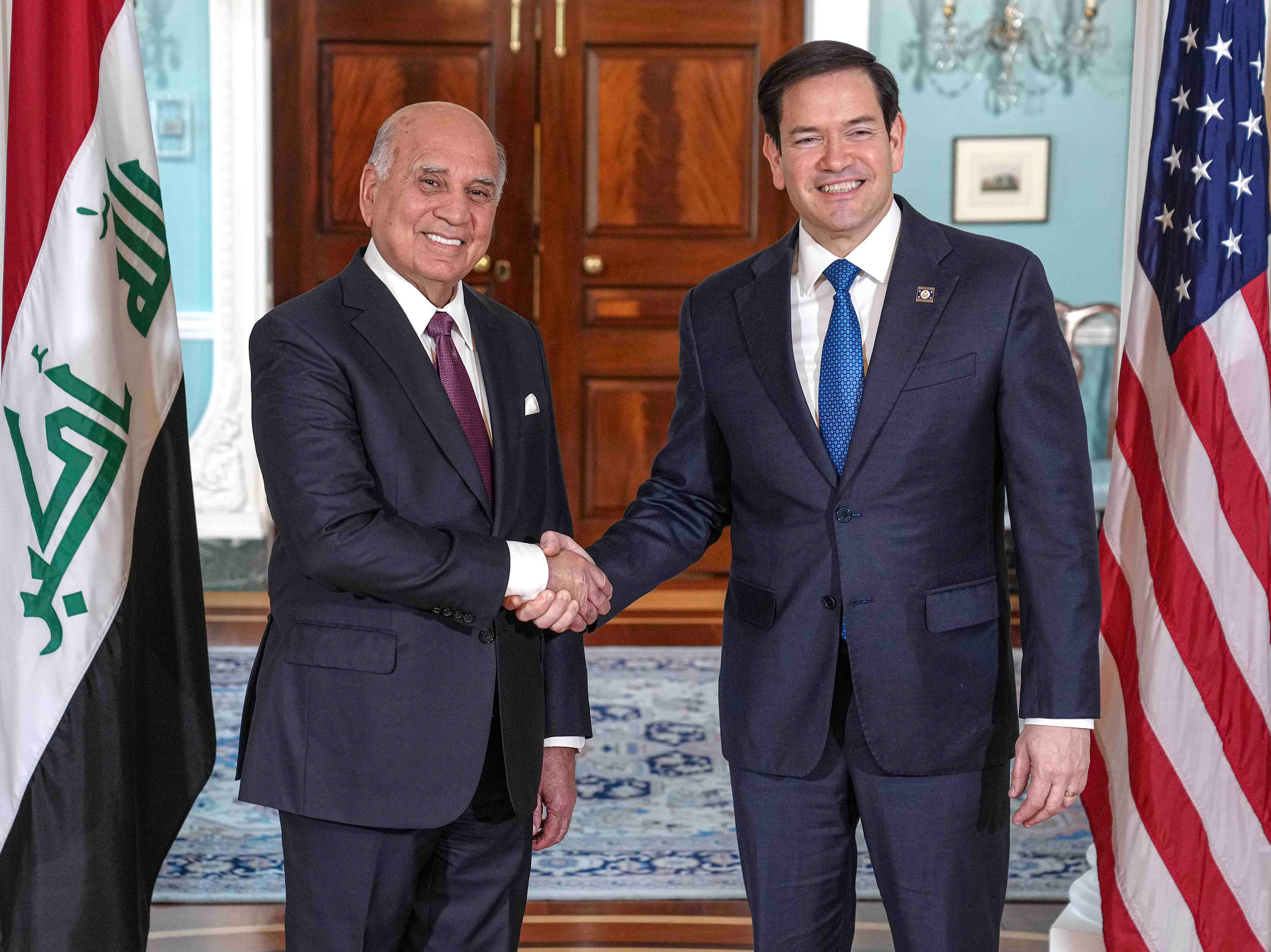
Hussein meets with U.S. Secretary of State Marco Rubio at the U.S. Department of State in Washington, D.C., in April 2025.

Less than a month afterwards, Hussein was nominated as a KDP candidate for the Finance Ministry. Prime Minister Adil Abdul-Mahdi proposed him and this was approved by parliament on 24 October 2018.

In August 2020, during a joint news conference with U.S. Secretary of State Mike Pompeo in Washington D.C., Hussein said that his country had signed an agreement with U.S. oil company Chevron Corporation as a memorandum of understanding with Iraq to execute the exploration work in Iraq's southern Nassiriya oilfield, one of the country's large oil fields, which is estimated to hold about 4.4 billion barrels of crude.

In February 2024, he told BBC News that Iraq could potentially be pushed into conflict due to escalations in the Iran–Israel proxy conflict.

Political offices
Preceded by Abdul Razzaq al-Issa	Minister of Finance of Iraq; 2018–2020	Succeeded by Ali Allawi
Preceded by Baha Araji	Deputy Prime Minister of Iraq; 2018–present	Incumbent
