= Qusay al-Suhail =

Iraqi politician

Dr. Qusay Abdul Wahab al-Suhail is an Iraqi politician from the Sadrist Movement who is the current Minister of Higher Education in the Government of Adil Abdul-Mahdi.

== Background ==
He graduated from Baghdad University with an MSc and a PhD in Hydrology and went on to be an assistant professor at the University of Basrah.

== Political activities ==
For the 2010 Iraqi parliamentary election, the Shiite Islamist National Iraqi Alliance split, with Prime Minister Nouri al-Maliki leading his own State of Law Coalition. The cross-sectarian Iraqiya party won the most seats but fell well short of a majority. The Sadrists significantly increased their number of MPs and became the second largest component of the NAI. After eight months of negotiations, a national unity government incorporating all the main blocs was agreed. An Iraqiya MP, Osama al-Nujaifi, was elected Speaker of the Council of Representatives, with al-Suhail elected his first deputy. His election was seen as a sign that the Sadrists wanted to demonstrate that they had responsible professionals who were able to govern Iraq and move on from the insurgency against the United States army. He was also one of the first major politicians elected since the 2003 invasion of Iraq who was not from among the opposition politicians who organised themselves from exile under Saddam Hussein.

He was nominated as Minister for Higher Education by Prime Minister Adil Abdul Mahdi in October 2018, but was not approved by parliament due to disagreements between the Sadrists and the second largest bloc, Fatah. Suhail was eventually approved by the Council of Representatives on 18 December 2018, after they agreed to allow parliament to vote on five further ministries which were "not shrouded in disagreements" - a reference to the Interior and Defence Ministers.
