= Mustafa Jabar Sanad =

Iraqi politician (born 1985)

- مصطفى جبار سند

Minister of Communications
- Incumbent
- Assumed office 14 May 2026
- President: Nizar Amidi
- Prime Minister: Ali al-Zaidi
- Preceded by: Hiam Abboud Kazem

Personal details
- Born: Mustafa Jabar Sanad Zabin al-Maryani; 13 July 1985 (age 41) Basra, Iraq
- Occupation: Politician

Mustafa Jabar Sanad Zabin al-Maryani (Arabic: مصطفى جبار سند زبن المرياني; born 13 July 1985) is an Iraqi politician who has served as Minister of Communications in the government of Ali al-Zaidi since 14 May 2026.

== Life ==
Sanad was born in Basra Governorate in 1985. Mustafa obtained a Bachelor’s degree in Petrochemical Engineering Technology from the Southern Technical University, which is a university in Basra, and he obtained a Bachelor’s degree in Industrial Management for Oil and Gas from the University of Basra for Oil and Gas.
