= Furatayn Movement =

Political party in Iraq

Furatayn Movement تيار الفراتين (Arabic)
- Leader: Mohammed Shia' al-Sudani
- Secretary: Bashar al-Saedi
- Founder: Mohammed Shia' al-Sudani
- Founded: 19 January 2019; 7 years ago
- Split from: Dawa
- Headquarters: Baghdad, Iraq
- Ideology: Iraqi nationalism; Centrism; Reformism
- Political position: Centre
- National affiliation: Reconstruction and Development Coalition
- Slogan: Citizenship, Centrism, Justice
- Seats in the Council of Representatives of Iraq: 11 / 329
- Seats in the Governorate Councils: 0 / 440

The Furatayn Movement (Arabic: تيار الفراتين, romanized: Tayyār al-Furātayn) is an Iraqi centrist political party founded by Mohammed Shia al-Sudani. The party secretary is Bashar al-Saedi.

== History ==
On December 13, 2018, Mohammed Shia al-Sudani announced his departure from the Dawa Party and the State of Law Coalition. On January 19, 2019, he announced the formation of a new political party. Al-Sudani's official statement read: "Furatayn Movement is a genuine Iraqi political movement born to correct the trajectory of the State's work and stand against corruption and corruptors," he added "young people represent the backbone of the Furatayn Movement and are the spearhead of the coming reform." He also emphasized the intent for the party to be diverse and include all components of Iraqi society.

In the 2021 parliamentary elections, al-Sudani successfully won a seat in the Council of Representatives of Iraq, and in October 2022 after a period of deadlock, he was sworn in as the Prime Minister of Iraq.

In 2023, Furatayn announced that it will not participate in the 2023 Iraqi governorate elections.

In 2024, ahead of the 2025 Iraqi parliamentary election, there were reports of a potential alliance between Furatayn and Sadrist Movement.

On 20 May 2025, Mohammed Shia al-Sudani announced the formation of a new political alliance named Reconstruction and Development Coalition (Arabic: ائتلاف الإعمار والتنمية, romanized: Iʼtilāf al-Iʻmār wa-al-tanmiyah), that will participate in the upcoming 2025 parliamentary elections. It is composed of Furatayn Movement, National Contract Coalition headed by Falih Al-Fayyadh, Wataniya Coalition headed by Ayad Allawi, Ibdaa Karbala Coalition headed by Nassif Jassim, current governor of Karbala Governorate; Bilad Sumer group headed by Ahmed Al Asadi, Minister of Labour and Social Affairs; Ajyal group headed by Mohammed al-Sahyoud, the Shaykh of the Al Sudani tribe in Iraq; and Huloul Coalition headed by Mohammed Sahib al-Daraji.

== Electoral results ==
The party contested in the 2021 Iraqi parliamentary election and initially won 1 out of 329 seats. However, 73 seats in parliament became vacant due to the resignation of Sadrist Movement, allowing Furatayn to gain an additional 2 seats.

Election	Votes	%	Seats	+/–	Position	Government
2021	39,682	0.45%	1 / 329	New	27th	Coalition
2025	As part of RDC		11 / 329	▲10	▲1st	Coalition
