= Abdul Karim Luaibi =

Iraqi politician

Abdul Karim Luaibi Bahedh

Minister of Oil
- In office December 2010 – 8 September 2014
- Prime Minister: Nouri Maliki
- Preceded by: Hussain Al Shahristani
- Succeeded by: Adil Abdul-Mahdi

Personal details
- Born: 1959 (age 66–67) Baghdad, Iraqi Republic (now in Republic of Iraq)
- Children: Six
- Education: Baghdad University

Abdul Karim Luaibi Bahedh (born 1959) is an Iraqi politician who served as the minister of oil of Iraq between December 2010 and 8 September 2014.

== Early life and education ==
Luaibi was born into a Shiite family in Baghdad in 1959. He holds a Bachelor of Science degree in petroleum engineering, which he received from Baghdad University in 1982.

== Career and activities ==
From 1982 to 1998, Luaibi worked in several oil companies. He began to work at state-owned South Oil Company in 1982. In 1998, he joined the ministry of oil, and served in different positions until 2009. He was appointed deputy minister of oil in charge with the upstream operations in 2009, and was in office until 2010. During his tenure, he was instrumental in securing the oil and gas contracts with international oil companies and other oil-related agreements with neighboring countries of Iraq.

In December 2010, he was appointed oil minister, replacing Hussain Al Shahristani, to the cabinet headed by prime minister Nouri Maliki. Luaibi was part of the Iraqi National Alliance. He acted as the president of OPEC's 162nd ordinary meeting which was held in Vienna on 12 December 2012.

== Corruption ==
In March 2016, an investigate report published on the Huffington Post revealed that Luaibi was part of a major corruption ring in the Iraqi oil industry. The report noted that Luaibi played a role in securing oil contracts for foreign oil companies in exchange for bribes.

== Family ==
Luaibi is married and has six children.

Political offices
Preceded by Hussain Al Shahristani	Oil Minister of Iraq; 2010 – present	Succeeded by Incumbent
