= Jamal al-Adili =

Iraqi politician

Jamal Abbas al-Adili is an Iraqi independent politician who is the current Water Resources Minister in the Government of Adil Abdul-Mahdi.

He was approved by the Council of Representatives on 24 October 2018.
