= Thamir Ghadhban =

Iraqi politician

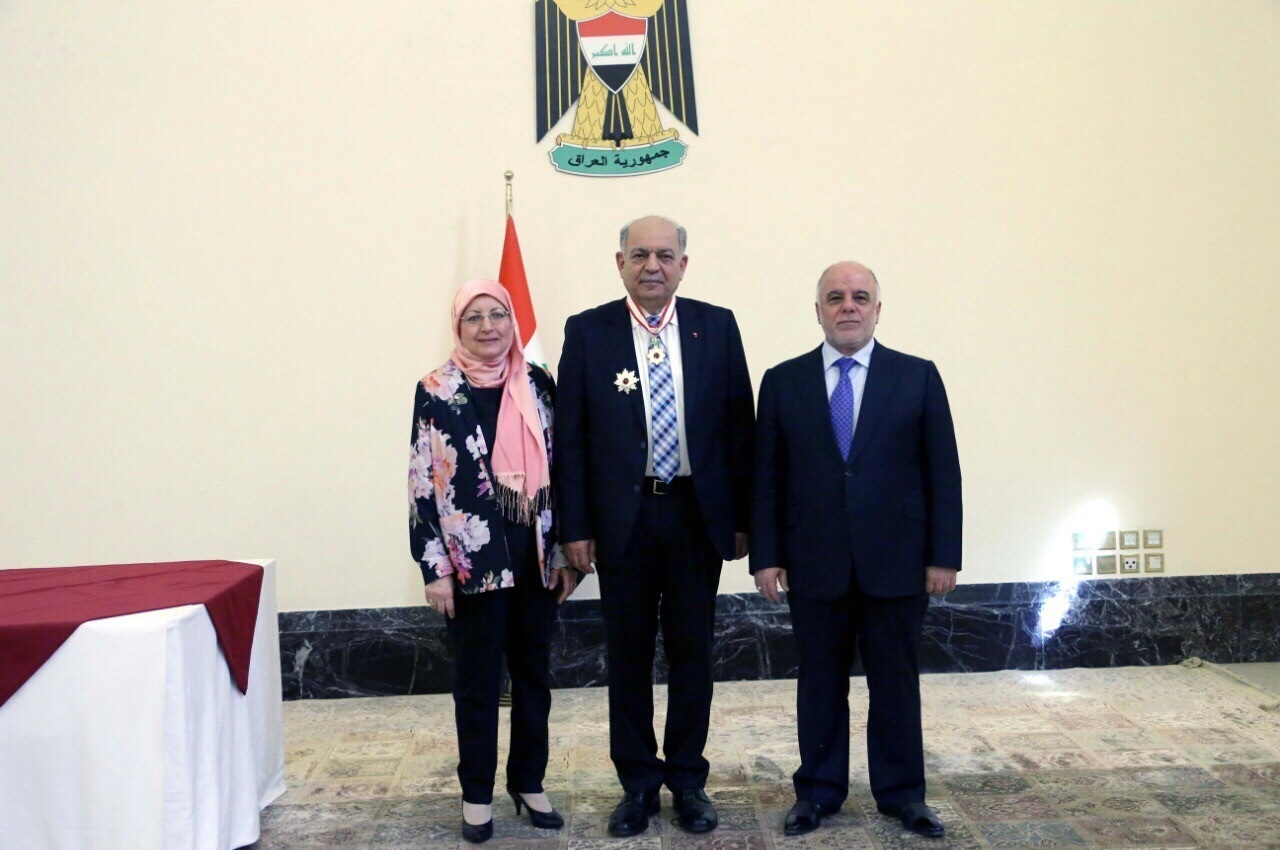
- Japanese Imperial Decorations ceremony. Mr. Thamir Ghadhban (middle), Mrs. Ghadhban (left), and Prime Minister Haider al-Abadi (right). May 2016.

Deputy Prime Minister of Iraq
- In office 25 October 2018 – 6 May 2020
- Prime Minister: Adil Abdul-Mahdi
- Preceded by: Saleh al-Mutlaq
- Succeeded by: Ali Allawi

Minister of Oil
- In office 25 October 2018 – 6 May 2020
- Prime Minister: Adil Abdul-Mahdi
- Preceded by: Jabbar Alluaibi
- Succeeded by: Ihsan Abdul Jabbar Ismaael

Personal details
- Born: 16 April 1945 (age 81) Karbala, Iraq
- Party: Independent politician
- Education: University College London, B.Sc; Imperial College London, M.Sc
- Website: ghadhban.com

Thamir Abbas Ghadhban (Arabic: ثامر عباس غضبان) (born in Karbala, 16 April 1945) is an Iraqi civil servant and politician.

Thamir has specialised in the oil industry since the early 1970s. After the war in 2003 he became chief executive officer of the Ministry of Oil, and in mid of the following year he served as Interim Oil Minister in the interim government headed by interim prime minister Ayad Allawi. In 2005 he became a Parliament member and the head of one of the six committees, his committee was in charge of writing chapter four: Powers of the Federal Authorities in the permanent constitution Constitution of Iraq#Chapter Four: Powers of the Federal Authorities and one of three technocrats to draft Iraq's much debated oil and gas law, which is still waiting to be approved by the parliament. In late April 2006, there was strong speculation that he would again be appointed Minister of Oil, this time by the government of Nuri al-Maliki. In 2012 and 2016 he was nominated by Iraq to be secretary-general of OPEC. Up until early 2018 he served as the chairman of the prime minister's advisory committee. In April 2016 he was awarded the Japanese Imperial Decorations the Order of the Rising Sun, Silver Star, and Gold Star by Emperor Akihito of Japan, in recognition of his contribution to developing economic relations and promoting mutual understanding between Japan and Iraq. On 24 October 2018, Mr Ghadhban returned to serve as Deputy Prime Minister for Energy and Minister of Oil of Iraq, this time as part of the newly approved government of Prime Minister Adil Abdul Mahdi .

== Education ==
- BSc. in geology from University College London, in 1970.
- MSc. in petroleum reservoir engineering from Imperial College London, in 1973.

== Professional career ==
- Joined Basrah Petroleum Company (BPC) in 1973 and moved to Iraq National Oil Company (INOC) in 1989.
- At BPC worked in petroleum and reservoir engineering on oil fields in the south of the country, and then became head of the Petroleum and Reservoir Engineering department for several years until 1989.
- 1989-1990: Director General of Reservoir and Field Development at the Iraqi Oil Ministry.
- 1991-1992: Director General of Planning and Studies at the Oil Ministry.
- 1992 Arrested for three months in Directorate of General Security by Saddam Hussein regime for criticizing, Hussein Kamel al-Majid ordered to remove him form his post.
- 1993-2001: Technical advisor to the Oil Ministry. During this period, ran numerous specialist committees responsible for conducting studies and producing plans, as well as committees negotiating with international oil companies for oil development or other projects.
- 2001-April 2003: Director General of Planning at the Oil Ministry.
- From 3 May 2003: Chief Executive Officer of the Oil Ministry.
- June 2004-May 2005: Minister of Oil under Ayad Allawi government.
- 30 January 2005: Elected to the National Assembly.
- 2005-2006: Advisor of Vice President of Iraq Adil Abdul-Mahdi.
- 2006-2016: Chairman of Prime Minister's Advisers committee under Prime Minister Nouri al-Maliki and his successor Haider al-Abadi.
- 2016-2018: Adviser of Prime Minister Haider al-Abadi.
- 24 October 2018 – 6 May 2020: Deputy Prime Minister for Energy and Minister of Oil.

== Studies and reports ==
- Author or co-author of more than 50 studies, patents, reports and technical papers as well as numerous papers and presentations on different aspects of the Iraqi oil industry presented on the occasion of international oil and gas conferences.
- In 2000 OAPEC granted Thamir Abbas Ghadhban its Distinguished Science Award.

Political offices
| Preceded by Amer Rasheed Al Obaydi | Minister of Oil; April 2003 – September 2003 | Succeeded by Ibrahim Mohammad Bahr al-Ulloum |
| Preceded by Ibrahim Mohammad Bahr al-Ulloum | Minister of Oil; June 2004 – May 2005 | Succeeded by Ahmed Chalabi |
| Preceded by Jabbar Alluaibi | Minister of Oil; October 2018 – Present | Succeeded by Incumbent |
