= Bassem al-Rubaye =

Iraqi politician

Bassem al-Rubaye is an Iraqi independent politician who was the Labour & Social Affairs Minister in the Government of Adil Abdul-Mahdi.

He was approved by the Council of Representatives on 24 October 2018.
