= Kamel al-Kilani =

Iraqi politician

Kamel Mubdir al-Kilani (Arabic: كامل مبدر الكيلاني) (born 1958) was Minister of Finance in the cabinet appointed by the Interim Iraq Governing Council in September 2003. A Sunni Muslim and contractor, al-Kilani remained in Iraq during the span of the Saddam Hussein government. He holds a diploma degree in economics and public administration from Mustansiriyah University in Baghdad

Preceded by Coalition Provisional Authority	Minister of Finance; September 2003 – June 2004	Succeeded by Adil Abdel-Mahdi
