= Jabbar Alluaibi =

Iraqi politician (born 1945)

Minister of Oil
- In office 19 July 2016 – 24 October 2018
- Prime Minister: Haider al-Abadi
- Preceded by: Adil Abdul-Mahdi
- Succeeded by: Thamir Ghadhban

Personal details
- Born: 13 June 1945 (age 80) Baghdad

Jabbar Ali Hussein Alluaibi (Arabic: جبار اللعيبي; born 13 June 1945) is an Iraqi politician who was in the position of the Iraqi Minister of Oil. He is the CEO of Iraq National Oil Company (INOC).

== Education ==
- Bachelor's degree in chemical engineering.
- Diploma in engineering / UK.

== The positions in which he worked ==
- 1973: Assistant engineer / field exploration and fielding.
- 1974: Assistant engineer / engineer loading oil in export / Fao port.
- 1975: Engineer / production engineer in Rumaila fields.
- 1977: Production Engineer oldest.
- 1978: Engineer production area.
- 1980: Senior Engineer / Head of the Technical Division in the Production Department.
- 1982: Senior engineer / export outlets director / assistant director of production department + assistant director of gas department.
- 1983: Warehouse Manager – Pipeline Section.
- 1985: Senior engineer / director of water injection department / First Deputy Director of General Operations + Deputy Director of Maintenance Department.
- 1987: Senior Engineer, Director of Production Department + First Deputy Director of General Operations + Deputy Director General Directorate of Security and Airfields.
- 1998: Expert / Production Division Manager / First Assistant Director of Operations Division.
- 1999: Expert / Director of Planning Department (Directorate of Planning and Budgeting).
- 2000: Expert / Head of the Directorate of Planning and Projects Studies.
- 2001: Expert / Director of Project Management Department.
- 2002: Expert / Director of Project Directorate.
- 2003: Expert / general manager of South Oil Company.
- 2008: Expert / Advisor to the Minister.
- 2009–2010: South Oil Company Director General
- 2016–2018: Iraqi Minister of Oil

== Minister of Oil ==
Alluaibi was approved as Minister of Oil by Iraq's parliament in August 2016 and on 15 August 2016 was sworn in as minister in the cabinet of Prime Minister Haider al-Abadi. Alluaibi replaced former Minister of Oil Adel Abdul Mahdi, who had suspended his cabinet seat in March 2016. Alluaibi is not formally connected to any political party and had been criticizing the inefficiency of the ministry of oil as early as 2009. In December 2017 Aluaibi signed a crude-oil exchange deal with Iran for one year, to export oil from northern Iraqi Kirkuk oilfield. In early 2018 Iraq also signed a deal with a U.S. company to further develop oil and gas fields in the south. The deal was described as an "important step" by Alluaibi.

Aluaibi regularly appears on national and international media, commenting on the developments within Iraq's oil and gas sector.

== See also ==
- Haider al-Abadi
