= Mohammad Hashim =

Iraqi politician

Mohammad Hashim is an Iraqi independent politician who served as Trade Minister in the Government of Adil Abdul-Mahdi.

He was approved by the Council of Representatives on 24 October 2018.
