= Ali Allawi =

Iraqi politician and academic (born 1947)

- علي علاوي
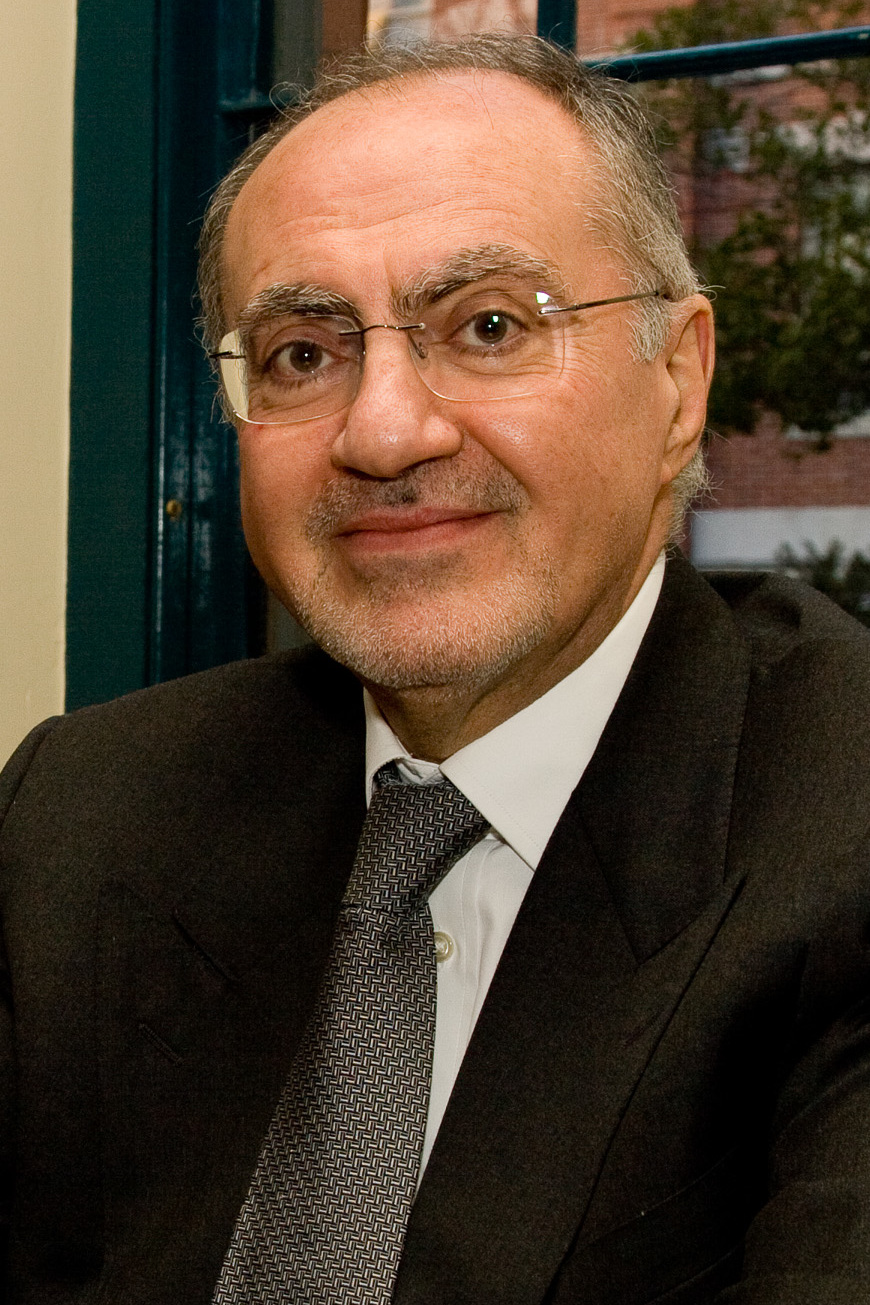
- Allawi in 2008

Iraq’s Deputy Prime Minister and Finance Minister
- In office 7 May 2020 – 16 August 2022
- President: Barham Salih
- Prime Minister: Mustafa Al-Kadhimi
- Preceded by: Fuad Hussein
- Succeeded by: Taif Sami Mohammed
- In office 6 April 2005 – May 2006
- President: Jalal Talabani
- Prime Minister: Ibrahim al-Jaafari
- Preceded by: Adil Abdul-Mahdi
- Succeeded by: Baqir Jabr al-Zubeidi

Minister of Defence
- In office April 2004 – June 2004
- President: Ghazi Mashal
- Prime Minister: Ayad Allawi
- Succeeded by: Hazim al-Shaalan

Minister of Trade
- In office September 2003 – June 2004
- Preceded by: Coalition Provisional Authority
- Succeeded by: Adil Abdul-Mahdi

Personal details
- Born: 1947 (age 78–79) Baghdad, Kingdom of Iraq
- Citizenship: Iraq, United Kingdom
- Party: Non-partisan
- Relations: Ahmed Chalabi (uncle); Ayad Allawi (cousin)
- Education: Massachusetts Institute of Technology; London School of Economics; Harvard University

Ali Abdul-Amir Allawi (Arabic: علي عبد الأمير علاوي; born 1947) is an Iraqi banker, businessman, politician, historian and political economist. His research focuses on the history and political economy of the modern Middle East and the economic history of the developing world. Allawi is a former visiting professor at Harvard, Princeton, and Oxford.

From May 2020 to August 2022, he served as Iraq's deputy prime minister and finance minister. He resigned from the post of finance minister on 16 August 2022 due to the deteriorating political situation in Iraq.

He was minister of trade and minister of defense in the cabinet appointed by the Interim Iraq Governing Council from September 2003 until 2004, and subsequently minister of finance in the Iraqi Transitional Government between 2005 and 2006.

== Background ==
Allawi was born in Baghdad in 1947 but spent most of his life in exile. He first left Iraq in 1958. His family had been deeply involved in the politics of the kingdom but found themselves on the wrong side of the 14 July Revolution. After the Ba’athist Ramadan Revolution in 1963, Allawi knew a return to Iraq would be impossible. He went to school in the United Kingdom, later moving to the United States to pursue higher education. In 1968, he graduated from Massachusetts Institute of Technology with a BSc in Transportation and Urban Planning, continuing his studies in Regional Planning at London School of Economics and graduating in 1971 with an MBA from Harvard University in Economics and International Finance.

== Banking career ==
After graduation he worked as an investment officer at the World Bank's Young Professionals Program based in Washington, D.C., and in 1978, after working as a consultant at the Arab Fund based in Kuwait, he co-founded the Arab International Finance merchant bank in London. In 1992 he founded Fisa Group which manages hedge funds.

== Academic career ==
Between 1999–2002 Allawi was a Senior Associate at St Antony's College, Oxford's Centre for Middle Eastern Studies. He is the author of The Occupation of Iraq: Winning the War, Losing the Peace and The Crisis of Islamic Civilization. Both books were well received by critics and the reading public. The New York Times Book Review called The Occupation of Iraq "...the most comprehensive historical account of the disastrous aftermath of the American Invasion.

In January 2007, Allawi received the Robert and Joanna Bendetson Global Public Diplomacy Award by the Institute for Global Leadership at Tufts University.

Between 2008–2009, Allawi was a Senior Fellow at Princeton University, and in June 2009, he became a Senior Visiting Fellow for the 2009–2010 academic years at the Carr Center, Harvard Kennedy School, Harvard University.

In October 2009, the Washington Institute for Near East Policy announced that his book The Crisis of Islamic Civilization was awarded the Silver Prize of its annual book prize. In December 2009, The Economist named The Crisis of Islamic Civilization one of the Best Books of 2009. In a 2009 interview with The Diplomat he discussed his views on modern Islamic civilization. He considers that, as a result of the expansion of Western colonial powers and modernization over the last 200 years, Islamic civilization is fast losing its "élan" and has been reduced to two aspects - political and religious - while economic and cultural aspects no longer affect the Muslim world.

In 2010, Allawi received an Honorary Professorship from Beloit College.

Allawi was appointed a Visiting Research Professor at the National University of Singapore in 2013–14. He was named 4th most influential thinker by Prospect in 2013.

In March 2014, Allawi's biography of Faisal I of Iraq, published by Yale University Press, was released to wide critical acclaim.

On 23 April 2024, Yale University Press published Allawi’s latest book titled Rich World, Poor World: The Struggle to Escape Poverty. In a review published by Foreign Affairs, Barry Eichengreen described the book "strong because it is so comprehensive, covering more than a century of development experience over much of the world", and wrote that he was impressed by Allawi’s achievement in "so fluently and concisely summarizing a century of global economic development and underdevelopment".

== Views ==
In January 2007, The Independent published an article by Allawi outlining a blueprint for peace in Iraq. Allawi recommended devolution within Iraq, economic and political regional integration in the Middle East, and the setting up of independent boards to oversee reconstruction and security issues. The article was praised by Independent commentator Patrick Cockburn, who argued that it was "by far the most perceptive analysis of the extent of the disaster in his country, and how it might best be resolved," and "it is in sharp contrast to the ill-thought-out maunderings of experts and officials devising fresh policies in the White House and Downing Street".

== Interviews ==
- Ali Allawi on Charlie Rose 04/11/07
- Interview with Ali Allawi for Guernica Magazine (guernicamag.com)
- http://www.foreignpolicy.com/story/cms.php?story_id=3330&print=1
- After Words interview with Allawi on The Occupation of Iraq, April 14, 2007
- Yale University Press site: listen to an interview with Ali A. Allawi on the Yale Press Podcast and to Allawi's first public radio interview on The Diane Rehm Show on WAMU 88.5 FM, American University Radio
- Interview on ABC's Lateline 12th Sep 07
- Interview with Kurt Schemers on Traders Nation about his book, The Crisis of Islamic Civilization, June 2009
- Interview with Ali Allawi The Diplomat, 2 June 2009

Preceded by Adel Abdul Mahdi	Minister of Finance of Iraq; 2005–2006	Succeeded by Bayan Jabr
Preceded by Fuad Hussein	Minister of Finance of Iraq; 2020–2022	Succeeded by Taif Sami Mohammed
