= Haidar Al Zamily =

Iraqi politician (born 1975)

Haidar Al Zamily حيدر الزاملي

Iraqi Minister of Justice
- Incumbent
- Assumed office 2016-2021
- President: Fuad Masum

Personal details
- Born: Wasit Province, Iraq
- Party: Islamic Virtue Party
- Occupation: politician

Haidar Nateq Jasim Al Zamili (born in Baghdad, 1975) (Arabic: حيدر الزاملي; ) is an Iraqi politician and Iraqi Minister of Justice. He is a candidate for the Islamic Virtue Party. He holds a PhD in computer science from the University of Petra in Jordan in 2011. He participated in the formation of the Islamic Virtue Party in Wasit., And included in the political work and assigned several tasks, including the head of the Office of "Essaouira", and became an assistant to the Secretary-General for the affairs of central provinces, and is now a member of the Political Bureau of the party.
