= Falah Hassan al-Zidan =

Iraqi politician

Falah Hassan al-Zidan فلاح حسن الزيدان

Minister of Agriculture
- In office 2014–2018
- President: Fuad Masum

Personal details
- Born: 1974 (age 51–52) Mosul, Iraq
- Occupation: Politician

Falah Hassan al-Zidan Al Luhaibi (born in Mosul, 1974) (Arabic: فلاح حسن الزيدان; ) is an Iraqi politician and Minister of Agriculture.

== Academic achievement and the places where he worked ==
- Bachelor of Civil Engineering / Al-Mustansiriya University
- Graduation year / 1996–1997

1 – Worked in the field of specialization in various companies in the private sector from 1998 to 2005 and was the last executive director of Eagle General Contracting Co. Ltd.

2 – Member of the House of Representatives in its first session 2006–2010

3 – Member of the Committee of Services in the House of Representatives in 2006–2007

4 – Member of the Security and Defense Committee in the House of Representatives 2008–2010

5. Member of the House of Representatives at its second session 2010–2014

6 – Member of the Security and Defense Committee in the House of Representatives 2010–2014

7 – Member of the House of Representatives in its third session 2014

8 – Minister of Agriculture in the Government of 2014
