= Malas (surname) =

Malas is a surname with multiple etymologies. Notable people include:

- Khaled Malas (born 1981), Syrian architect and art historian
- Mohammad Malas (born 1945), Syrian filmmaker
- Spiro Malas (1933–2019), American opera singer and actor
- Stavros Malas (born 1967), Cypriot politician
- Ewa Małas-Godlewska (born 1957), Polish opera singer
