= Ibrahim Bahr al-Uloom =

Iraqi politician (born 1954)

Muhammad-Ibrahim Bahr al-Uloom
- ابراهيم بحر العلوم
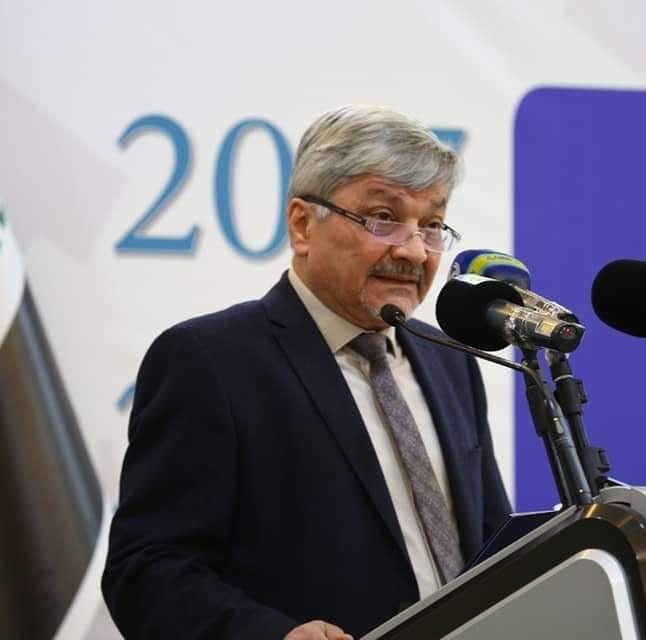

Oil Minister of Iraqi Interim Government
- In office 2003
- Preceded by: Thamir Ghadhban
- Succeeded by: Thamir Ghadhban

Oil Minister of Iraq
- In office May 2005 – December 2005
- Preceded by: Ahmed Chalabi
- Succeeded by: Ahmed Chalabi

Personal details
- Born: 1954 (age 71–72) Najaf, Iraq
- Party: Independent
- Relations: Mohammad Bahr al-Uloom (father); Razi Shirazi (maternal uncle)

Sayyid Dr. Muhammad-Ibrahim Bahr al-Uloom (Arabic: محمد ابراهيم بحر العلوم; born 1954) is an Iraqi politician, academician, and petroleum expert. He has served twice as the Iraqi Minister of Oil. He first took the ministerial role as part of the cabinet appointed by the Interim Iraq Governing Council in September 2003 until June 2004. Bahr al-Uloom went on to serve a second term as the minister in 2005 where he then submitted his resignation in protest against a governmental decision to increase the price of oil products five-fold.

== Early life and education ==
Bahr al-Uloom was born in 1954 in Najaf to Mohammad Bahr al-Uloom. From both sides, he hails from prominent scholarly families. From his paternal side he is from the Bahr al-Uloom family. From his mother's side, he hails from the Shirazi family. He claims agnatic descent from Muhammad's daughter Fatimah and her husband, Ali, the first Shia Imam.

Bahraluloom was educated in the United States, earning a Ph.D. in Petroleum Engineering from the New Mexico Tech. He previously worked for the Kuwaiti Oil Ministry after graduating from the University of Baghdad in BSc Petroleum Engineering. He worked for the Petroleum Recovery Research Center in New Mexico, and later as an oil and gas consultant in London, United Kingdom.

== Political career ==
Bahraluloom ran for parliament by forming his own independent political group, the Future Iraq Grouping. He was elected as a member of the National Iraqi Assembly in 2005, and was elected for another term as a member of parliament from 2014 - 2018. He was a member of the Oil & Energy Parliamentary committee where he headed the committee in forming the legislation for the Iraqi National Oil Company Law. The law was passed in March 2018.

He is a founding member of the Alalamain Institute for Higher Education. The first and only private higher education institute specialising in law and political science for postgraduate studies in Iraq. Bahraluloom is the chairman of the Iraqi Energy Academy, a scientific establishment whose mission is to develop human resources for the energy sector through the process of training and qualification. He survived an assassination attempt in Iraq in 2003 and another in 2005.

Preceded by Thamir Ghadhban	Minister of Oil; September 2003	Succeeded by Thamir Ghadhban
Preceded by Ahmed Chalabi	Minister of Oil; May 2005	Succeeded by Ahmed Chalabi
