= Ministry of Agriculture (Iraq) =

Ministry of Agriculture of Iraq
- Incumbent; Abdul-Rahim al-Shammari since 2022
- Appointer: Council of Representatives of Iraq
- Formation: 1921
- Salary: NONE
- Website: Official Website

The Ministry of Agriculture (Arabic: وزارة الزراعة العراقية) is one of the ministries of the Iraqi government. The ministry manages public and private agriculture in Iraq. Since 14 May 2026 the minister is Abdul-Rahim al-Shammari.
