= Mohammed Mahdi al-Bayati =

Iraqi politician

Mohammed Mahdi Ameen al-Bayati (Arabic: محمد مهدي أمين البياتي, Turkish: Muhammed Mehdi Emin Beyati; born 1962) is an Iraqi politician who was the Minister of Human Rights from 9 September 2014 to 16 August 2015. He is a Shia Turkmen from Amirli. He is a leading member of the Badr Organization, a Shia militia that opposed the government of Saddam Hussein.

== Political activities ==
An ethnic Turkmen and a Shia, he was elected to the Council of Representatives of Iraq in December 2005 as part of the National Iraqi Alliance, a pan-Shia list that won a plurality of the seats in the election. He was allocated a seat as a representative of the Badr Organization. While serving as an MP, in 2007, his convoy was attacked as he travelled to Kirkuk, killing four of his relatives. He opposed the presence of the Peshmerga in areas without a Kurdish majority, saying it was "unconstitutional".

He was appointed Human Rights minister in the cabinet of Prime Minister Haider al-Abadi, which was confirmed by the Council of Representatives on 9 September 2014. He denied the alleged human rights abuses against Iraq's Sunni Arabs and described the number of human rights violations committed by the Popular Mobilization Forces as "tiny". He said the government had "little choice" but to rely on the Shia militias, otherwise ISIS would have taken over the entire country. He was a very vocal activist during the Iraqi Turkmen genocide. His ministry also purchased thousands of Yazidi sex slaves from ISIS and emancipated them immediately after the purchases.

He asked the United Arab Emirates to remove the Badr Organisation and Saraya al-Salam, a militia from the Sadrist Movement, from their list of terrorist organisations.

He supported the use of the death penalty in Iraq, claiming that it would scare foreign ISIS fighters, saying "if they hear the news that we have stopped the death penalty, the whole world will come to Iraq to fight". He strongly opposed an amnesty for those facing the death penalty, asking "how about an amnesty for all those who were put in their graves by terrorists?"

In January 2015 he was involved in a controversy when his security guards allegedly attacked traffic police who stopped his convoy as it drove through the Yarmouk district of the capital Baghdad. The prime minister announced an investigation into the incident.

In August 2015, responding to popular demonstrations against government corruption and inefficiency, Prime Minister Haider al-Abadi announced a reduction in the number of ministers, abolishing the Human Rights ministry. As a result, al-Bayati left the cabinet.
