= Hoshyar Zebari =

Iraqi - Kurdish politician

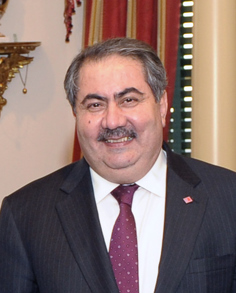

Deputy Prime Minister of Iraq
- In office 8 September 2014 – 18 October 2014 Serving with Saleh al-Mutlaq and Baha Araji
- Prime Minister: Haider al-Abadi
- Preceded by: Hussain al-Shahristani; Rowsch Shaways
- Succeeded by: Rowsch Shaways

Minister of Finance
- In office 18 October 2014 – 21 September 2016
- Prime Minister: Haider al-Abadi
- Preceded by: Najeeba Najeeb (acting)
- Succeeded by: Abdul Razzaq al-Issa (acting)

Minister of Foreign Affairs
- In office 1 September 2003 – 11 July 2014
- Prime Minister: Ayad Allawi; Ibrahim al Jaafari; Nouri al-Maliki
- Preceded by: Naji Sabri
- Succeeded by: Hussain al-Shahristani (acting)

Personal details
- Born: 23 September 1953 (age 73) Akre, Kingdom of Iraq
- Party: Kurdistan Democratic Party
- Spouse: Hana Abdul-Sattar al-Dulaimi
- Education: University of Essex

Hoshyar Mahmud Mohammed Zebari, or simply Hoshyar Zebari (also spelled Hoshyar Zibari, Kurdish: Hişyar Zêbarî; born 23 September 1953) is an Iraqi - Kurdish politician who served as Deputy Prime Minister of the country in 2014 and as Minister of Finance until 2016. He was Minister of Foreign Affairs from 2003 to 2014.

== Biography ==
Zebari was born to a Kurdish Iraqi family in Aqrah, a city in Duhok Governorate, and grew up in Mosul. He earned a Bachelor of Arts in Sociology from the University of Jordan in 1976. He also obtained a Master of Arts in Sociology of Development from the University of Essex in the United Kingdom in 1980. While studying in Britain, he led the Kurdish Students Society in Europe and served as the chairman of the Overseas Student Committee from 1978 to 1980.

Zebari joined the Kurdistan Democratic Party (KDP) in 1979. In the 1980s, he fought as a member of the Peshmerga in the Iraqi–Kurdish conflict against the government of Saddam Hussein. He went on to become a member of the KDP's Central Committee and its Political Bureau. In 1988, he was put in charge of its foreign relations and represented the party in the United States and the UK. In 1992, he was appointed a member of the executive committee of the Iraqi National Congress and was made part of its Presidential Council in 1999.

After the 2003 invasion of Iraq, Zebari was appointed a member of the Iraqi Governing Council. He was made foreign minister in September 2003. In July 2012, he said that al-Qaeda in Iraq members had gone to Syria, where the militants previously received support and weapons.

On 11 July 2014, Zebari was replaced as foreign minister by Hussain al-Shahristani, Iraq's deputy prime minister, who assumed the position in an acting capacity after Kurdish politicians withdrew from the government of Prime Minister Nouri al-Maliki. On 8 September 2014, he was appointed a Deputy Prime Minister under the government of the new premier, Haider al-Abadi.

On 18 October 2014, Zebari was given the post of Minister of Finance of Iraq, while Rowsch Shaways was appointed the new Deputy Prime Minister in his place. On 21 September 2016, he was dismissed from his position as finance minister after losing a no-confidence motion over allegations of corruption.

In October 2017, Iraqi politicians and officials called on the government to investigate Zebari for nepotism after it was revealed that he had appointed his wife and seven of her family members to Iraqi embassies in various European countries.

Zebari tried to participate as a candidate in the presidential elections in 2022, but was banned by the Federal Supreme Court of Iraq over allegations of corruption against him dating back to 2016. He protested the decision, stating that no court had convicted him.

== Personal life ==
Zebari is an Iraqi Kurd and a Sunni Muslim. His father was Mahmoud Agha Zebari, the chief of the Zebari clan, who was assassinated by the Iraqi Intelligence Service in 1981. Three of his older brothers were also killed by Saddam Hussein's regime. His family currently consists of three younger brothers and two younger sisters. He is also the uncle of Massoud Barzani, the former President of Iraqi Kurdistan. His late sister Hamael Mahmoud Agha Zebari had married Mustafa Barzani and gave birth to Massoud. He holds dual citizenship, being a national of both Iraq and Britain.

Zebari has been married twice. His second wife is Hana Abdul-Sattar al-Dulaimi, the daughter of Abdul-Sattar al-Dulaimi, who was an advisor to Saddam Hussein. His first wife was born in the town of Amedi in Iraq's Duhok Governorate.

Political offices
Preceded by Ba'athist Iraq: Naji Sabri; Iraq: Ghassan Muhsen (Chairman of the Steering Committee)	Minister of Foreign Affairs; 2003–2014	Succeeded by Hussain al-Shahristani
Preceded by Hussain al-Shahristani	Deputy Prime Minister of Iraq; 2014–present	Succeeded by Incumbent
Preceded by Rowsch Shaways	Minister of Finance; 2014–2016	Succeeded by Abdul Razzaq al-Issa
