= Nasser Al Esawi =

Iraqi politician

Nasser Al Esawi نصير العيساوي

Minister of Industry & Minerals
- Incumbent
- Assumed office 2014

Personal details
- Born: 27 January 1975 (age 50) Najaf, Iraq
- Profession: politician

Nasser Al Esawi (Arabic: نصير العيساوي; born 27 January 1975 in Najaf, Iraq) is an Iraqi politician, currently Minister of Industry & Minerals.

== Education ==
- Bachelor of Arts in English language at the University of Kufa
- Master of Law at the University of Kufa

== Career ==
- Member of the Teachers Syndicate
- Member of the Bar Association
- Member of the Iraqi Parliament of the First Session 2006–2011
- Member of the Iraqi Council of Representatives for the third parliamentary session
- Member of the Committee of civil society organizations for the first parliamentary session
