= Ministry of Communications (Iraq) =

Government ministry of Iraq

Republic of Iraq Ministry of Communications
- وزارة الاتصالات

Agency overview
- Jurisdiction: Government of Iraq
- Headquarters: Baghdad, Iraq
- Minister responsible: Mustafa Sanad, Minister
- Website: www.moc.gov.iq

The Ministry of Communications (MoC) of Iraq is a federal government ministry concerned with providing basic telecommunications services to the public, government, and businesses. The MoC provides postal service to the general public and manages postal savings accounts. It also runs the State Company for Internet Services and represents Iraq at international organization such as the International Telecommunication Union (ITU) and the Universal Postal Union (IPU).

== See also ==
- National Communications and Media Commission of Iraq
