= Malas Abdulkarim al-Kasnazani =

Iraqi politician

Malas Mohammad Abdulkarim al-Husseini al-Kasnazani is an Iraqi politician who was the Trade Minister from September 2014 until December 2015 under Prime Minister Haider al-Abadi.

== Background ==
Malas al-Kasnazani is of Kurdish origin, a son of Sheikh Mohammed Abdul Karim al-Kasnazani, the leader of the Kasnazani order of Sufism. During the PUK insurgency in the late 1970s, Sheikh al-Kasnazani organised a militia that fought on the side of the Iraqi government against the Kurdish peshmerga. He established the order in Baghdad, becoming involved in the oil trade and close to senior Baath Party leader (and fellow Sufi) Izzat Ibrahim al-Douri.

In the 1990s, Malas and his two brothers Nehru and Gandhi were arrested for allegedly forging the signature of then-President of Iraq, Saddam Hussein. They were released and fled with their father to Sulaymaniyah in Iraqi Kurdistan.

In advance of the 2003 invasion of Iraq led by the United States, Sheikh Kasnazani was reported to have been paid millions of US Dollars by the CIA for information and was nicknamed by then "the pope". Nehru and Gandhi were codenamed "the rockstars" and were paid by their handler a reported $1m per month, which they used to buy weapons on the black market.

The first general election following the invasion took place in January 2005. Most Sunni Arabs boycotted the election, but Nehru Kasnazani led a list called the Coalition for Iraqi National Unity. They failed to win any seats in the national vote in either January or December 2005, but won 5 seats in the 2005 provincial elections in Salahuddin and two in the 2009 provincial elections in al Anbar. In 2009 Nehru reportedly lobbied in the United States to become the next President of Iraq after Jalal Talabani.

Prior to the 2010 general election, the Accountability and Justice Committee barred the CINU from running due to links to the Baath Party of former president Saddam Hussein.

== Trade Minister ==
The general election in April 2014 elected a parliament where the State of Law party of Prime Minister Nouri al-Maliki held the most seats, but this was only 28% of MPs. A coalition was formed from across the spectrum of parties including that of Ayad Allawi, former Prime Minister and leader of the al-Wataniya party.

Kasnazani, an ally of Allawi, was proposed as Minister of Trade by newly appointed Prime Minister Haider al-Abadi. He was approved by the Council of Representatives on 8 September 2014, one of 23 ministers approved that day.

== Corruption charges ==
In October 2015, an arrest warrant was issued for the serving minister and his brother Nehru, by then a wealthy businessman based in Amman, Jordan. He was reported to have been accused of awarding contracts to firms linked to Nehru without proper tendering.

Kasnazani was sacked as Trade Minister in December 2015, officially for not attending work. He was reported to have fled to Amman.

In November 2018, Kasnazani was found guilty in absentia with two of his ministry officials of embezzling up to $14m from a rich import scheme. He was sentenced to seven years in prison.
