= Ministry of Electricity (Iraq) =

Government ministry of Iraq

Coordinates: 33.320°N 44.369°E

Republic of Iraq Ministry of Electricity
- وزارة الكهرباء

Agency overview
- Jurisdiction: Government of Iraq
- Headquarters: Baghdad (Iraq)
- Agency executive: Ali Sa'di Whaib, Minister
- Website: Official website

The Ministry of Electricity (MoE; Arabic: وزارة الكهرباء) is the Iraqi federal government ministry concerned with the production, transmission, and distribution of electrical energy in the country.

It is responsible for both the policymaking and the electricity supply throughout the country. The operational functions (power generation, transmission, load dispatch and distribution) are no longer autonomous corporatized entities, but were reorganized into 18 geographically based directorates within MoE.

== Successive ministerial resignations ==
Several Ministers of Electricity's have resigned during the summer season (a total of 18 ministers), with the latest resignation having been submitted in June 2021. That resignation by then-Minister Majed Hantoosh coincided with widespread blackouts which took place during soaring temperatures exceeding 50 °C (122 °F), caused in part by Iran having cut energy supplies to the country. Hantoosh resigned a day prior to the Iranian cutback announcement. Some experts estimate that Iraq loses 30 to 50 percent of its electrical supply to outdated circuits.
