= Adil Abdul-Mahdi =

Prime Minister of Iraq from 2018 to 2020

- عادل عبد المهدي
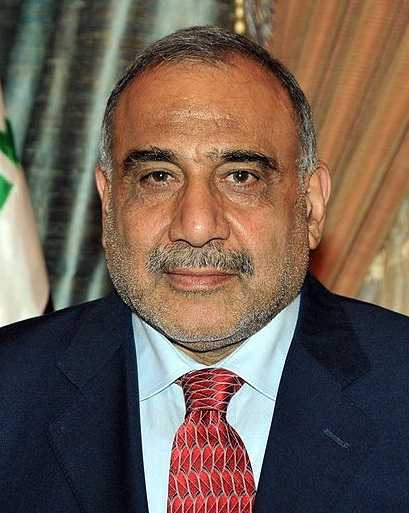
- Abdul-Mahdi in 2008

Prime Minister of Iraq
- In office 25 October 2018 – 7 May 2020
- President: Barham Salih
- Deputy: Thamir Ghadhban; Fuad Hussein
- Preceded by: Haider al-Abadi
- Succeeded by: Mustafa Al-Kadhimi

Minister of Oil
- In office 8 September 2014 – 19 July 2016
- Prime Minister: Haider al-Abadi
- Preceded by: Abdul Karim Luaibi
- Succeeded by: Jabbar Alluaibi

Vice President of Iraq
- In office 7 April 2005 – 11 July 2011 Serving with Ghazi al-Yawer (until 2006) and Tariq al-Hashimi (after 2006)
- President: Jalal Talabani
- Preceded by: Rowsch Shaways
- Succeeded by: Tariq al-Hashimi

Minister of Finance
- In office 2 June 2004 – 6 April 2005
- Prime Minister: Ayad Allawi
- Preceded by: Kamel al-Kilani
- Succeeded by: Ali Allawi

Personal details
- Born: Adil Abdul-Mahdi al-Muntafiki; 1 January 1942 (age 84) Baghdad, Iraq
- Party: Independent (since 2017); SCIRI (1982–2017); Iraqi Communist (1970s)
- Spouse: Rajah
- Education: University of Baghdad (BA); University of Poitiers (MA, PhD)
- Website: t.me/AdiIAbdAlmahdi01

Adil Abdul-Mahdi al-Muntafiki (Arabic: عادل عبد المهدي المنتفكي, born 1 January 1942) is an Iraqi politician who served as prime minister of Iraq from October 2018 until May 2020. Abdul-Mahdi is an economist and was one of the vice presidents of Iraq from 2005 to 2011. He formerly served as Minister of Finance in the Interim government and Oil Minister from 2014 to 2016.

Abdul-Mahdi is a former member of the powerful Shi'a party the Supreme Islamic Iraqi Council, or SIIC. Long based in neighboring Iran, the group opposed a United States administration while holding close ties with the other, U.S.-backed, groups that opposed Saddam Hussein, including the Kurds and the Iraqi National Congress.

Abdul-Mahdi submitted his formal resignation as prime minister in November 2019, following widespread protests over political corruption and violent police responses.

== Background ==
Mahdi was born in Baghdad in 1942, the son of a Shiite cleric, Abdul-Mahdi, originally from Dhi Qar Governorate, who was the Minister of Education in Iraq's monarchy, and a mother from Syria. He attended high school at Baghdad College, an elite American Jesuit secondary school. After graduating, he attended Baghdad University, where he earned a Bachelor of Arts degree in economics in 1963. He worked as a secretary for the Iraqi foreign ministry in 1965 and was an early supporter of the Iraqi Ba'ath Party, but left due to ideological disagreements. In 1969, he moved to France where he worked for French think tanks and edited magazines in French and Arabic. In 1972 he obtained another Master of Arts degree in political economy from the University of Poitiers. He later obtained a PhD in economics. Abdul-Mahdi is a French citizen, as are his children, and he returned to Iraq after the overthrow of Saddam Hussein in 2003.

== Early career ==
In the 1970s, Abdul-Mahdi was a leading member of the Iraqi Communist Party. The party split into two separate factions, the ICP-Central Committee, which was more accommodating of the military governments that had ruled Iraq since 1958, and the ICP-Central Leadership, which rejected all forms of cooperation of what it regarded as anti-progressive regimes, in 1967. Abdul-Mahdi joined the ICP-Central Leadership, and continued being active until he was expelled in and formed his own splinter claiming to be the legitimate ICP-Central Leadership. Both the ICP-Central Leadership and Abdul-Mahdi's splinter gradually disappeared by the early 1980s. By that time, Abdul-Mahdi adopted Iranian Islamic ideas, eventually merging with the Islamists when Ayatollah Khomeini eradicated the communists and liberal opposition groups in Iran. Abdul-Mahdi continued his association with Iran and gradually amalgamated his group within the ICP-Central Leadership with the Iranians, rejecting his Marxist past and devoting all his group's time to propagating Khomeini's ideas in France, where he lived at the time. He eventually was made a member of the Supreme Council for the Islamic Revolution in Iraq, an exiled opposition party and militia that was formed by Iran in Tehran in 1982 but composed exclusively of Iraqi exiles.

== Vice-president ==
In 2006, Abdul-Mahdi, outgoing Vice President in the transitional government, unsuccessfully ran for the United Iraqi Alliance's nomination for Prime Minister against incumbent Ibrahim al-Jaafari. He lost by one vote. He was reportedly considered to be a possibility for Prime Minister once again until Nouri al-Maliki became the UIA nominee. Subsequently, Abdul-Mahdi was re-elected as Vice President of Iraq. He exerted his limited authority in that role by delaying the first meeting of the National Assembly in March.

On 26 February 2007, he survived an assassination attempt that killed ten people. He had been targeted two times prior.

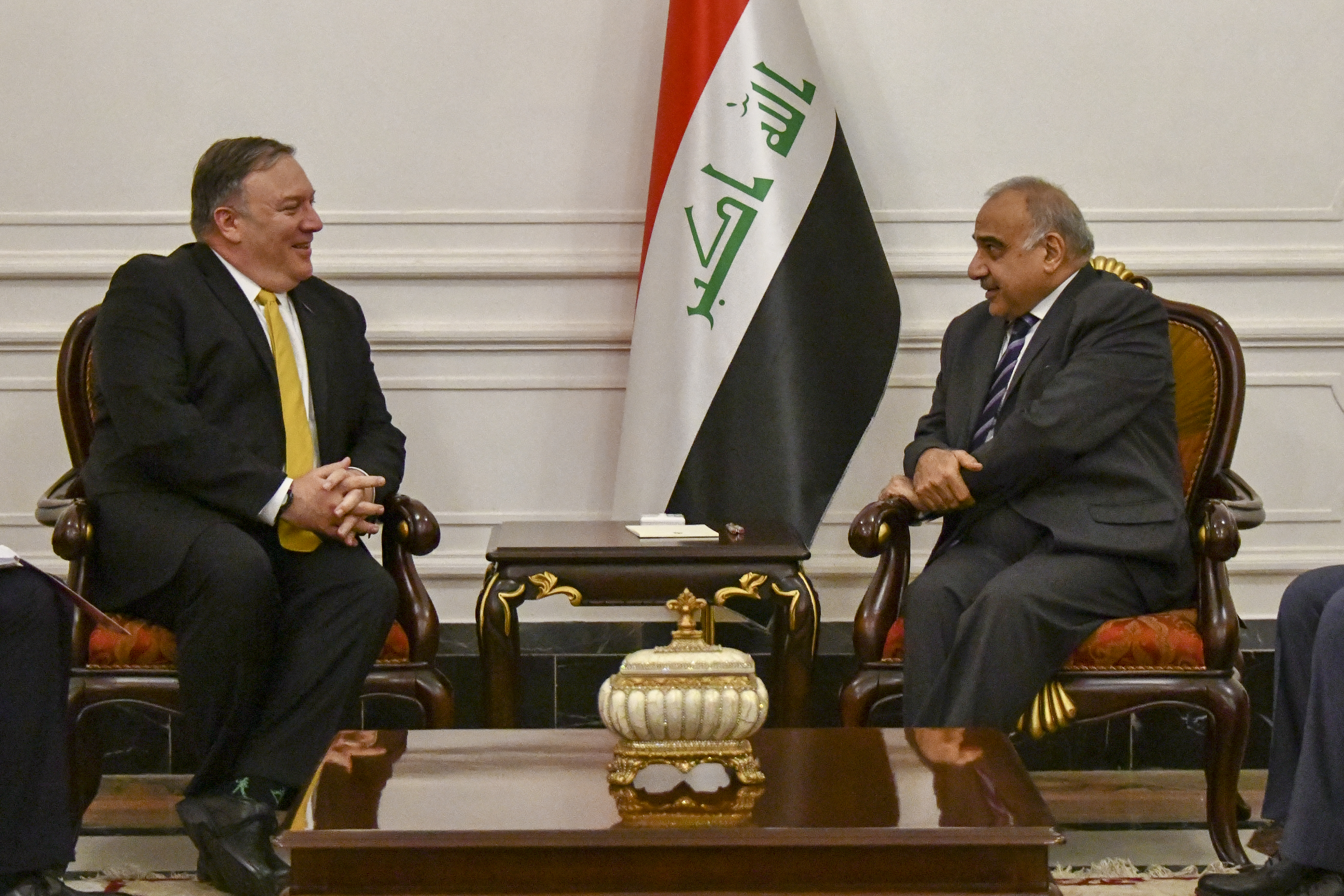
Abdul-Mahdi meets with U.S. Secretary of State Michael R. Pompeo in Baghdad, Iraq on 9 January 2019.

In 2009, his bodyguards were the perpetrators of a bloody bank robbery in Baghdad.

He resigned from his position as vice-president on 31 May 2011. In July 2013, Abdul-Mahdi announced his decision to give up his retirement pensions as a former vice president.

== Prime minister ==
On 2 October 2018, Iraqi president Barham Salih selected Abdul-Mahdi to be the Prime Minister of Iraq. Mahdi had 30 days to form a new government. On 25 October 2018, Abdul Mahdi was sworn into office, five months after the 2018 elections.

In April 2019, Abdul-Mahdi met with German Chancellor Angela Merkel in Berlin. He announced a $14 billion plan to upgrade Iraq's electricity infrastructure, with likely cooperation with German company Siemens. Merkel also pledged to strengthen economic and security cooperation between the two countries, and to continue German support for reconstruction efforts in Iraq.

On 29 November 2019, after weeks of violent protests, Mahdi stated that he would resign from his post. The Iraqi parliament approved his resignation on 1 December 2019. After leaving office, Abdul-Mahdi remained active in regional political affairs. In March 2025, he visited Sanaa, Yemen, to attend the Houthi-organized conference "Palestine: The Central Issue of the Umma". Asharq Al-Awsat reported that the visit prompted speculation in Iraq about its purpose and political meaning. The Washington Institute described the visit as part of Abdul-Mahdi's growing political role on behalf of Iraqi militias, particularly Kata'ib Hezbollah.

Political offices
Preceded by Kamel al-Kilani	Minister of Finance; 2004–2005	Succeeded by Ali Allawi
Preceded by Ibrahim Jaafari and Rowsch Shaways; Interim	Vice President of Iraq; Served alongside Ghazi al-Yawer, Tariq al-Hashimi and Khodair al-Khozaei; 2005–2011	Succeeded by Tariq al-Hashimi and Khodair al-Khozaei
Preceded by Abdul Karim Luaibi	Energy Minister of Iraq; 2014–2016	Succeeded by Jabbar al-Luaibi
Preceded by Haider al-Abadi	Prime Minister of Iraq; 2018–2020	Succeeded by Mustafa Al-Kadhimi
