= 2021 in Iraq =

- Decades: 2000s; 2010s; 2020s
- See also: Other events of 2021; List of years in Iraq

Events in the year 2021 in Iraq.

== Incumbents ==
- President: Barham Salih
- Prime Minister: Mustafa Al-Kadhimi

== Events ==
=== January ===
- 7 January – Iraqi court issues an arrest warrant for current American president Donald Trump for the assassination of Iranian general Qassim Soleimani and Iraqi militia leader Abu Mahdi al-Muhandis a year earlier.
- 15 January – The United States announce cutting its troops in Iraq to 2,500, the lowest number since 2003.
- 21 January – Suicide bombing attack kills 32 people and wounds 110 others at an open-air market in Baghdad.

=== February ===
- 10–14 February – Turkey launched Operation Claw-Eagle 2 in Iraqi Kurdistan region.
- 15 February – The capital of Iraqi Kurdistan, Erbil, is struck by multiple missiles killing a civilian contractor and wounding at least 8 people including American service members.

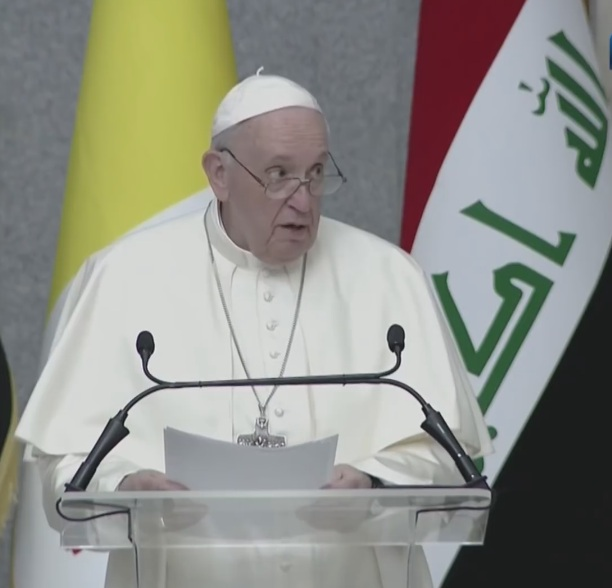
Pope Francis on his visit to Iraq, March 2021

=== March ===
- 7 March – Pope Francis visits Iraq and holds prayer in the al-Tahera Church, an ancient church destroyed by Islamic State. Amid the ruins, he called for peace and prayed for the victims of the conflict with the ISIL.

=== April ===
- 15 April – UNESCO announces its architectural design competition winners for rebuilding Al-Nouri Mosque, which was destroyed during ISIL's presence in Mosel.
- 24 April – A fire at the COVID-19 quarantine section of al Al-Khatib Hospital in Baghdad kills at least 82 people and wounds 110 others in one of the worst fires in Iraqi history.

=== May ===
- 9 May – Protests erupt in Karbala after the killing of prominent rights activist Ihab Jawad Al-Wazni.
- 19–20 May – Iraqi protesters gather in Palestine street in Baghdad and on the Iraqi-Jordanian borders in support of Palestinians. Calling for an end of Israeli bombing and for Iraqi aid to be allowed into Palestine through Jordan.

=== June ===
- 1 June – Iraq records the first death from Mucormycosis associated with the COVID-19 pandemic, with 4 more cases recorded.
- 4 June – An explosion in Baghdad's Al Kadhimiya district results in 3 dead and 14 injured.
- 27 June – Egyptian President Abdel Fattah al-Sisi and Jordanian King Abdullah II visit Baghdad in a trilateral summit to discuss economic and diplomatic relations in the region.

=== July ===
- 12 July – A blaze at Al-Hussein Teaching Hospital in Nasiriyah kills 92 people and injures about 100 others.
- 19 July – A suicide bombing at an open-air market in Baghdad kills at least 35 people.

=== August ===
- 9 August – Iraq begins flying back Iraqis who had traveled to Belarus and got stuck on the Lithuanian border attempting to cross into the European union as part of the Belarus–EU border crisis.
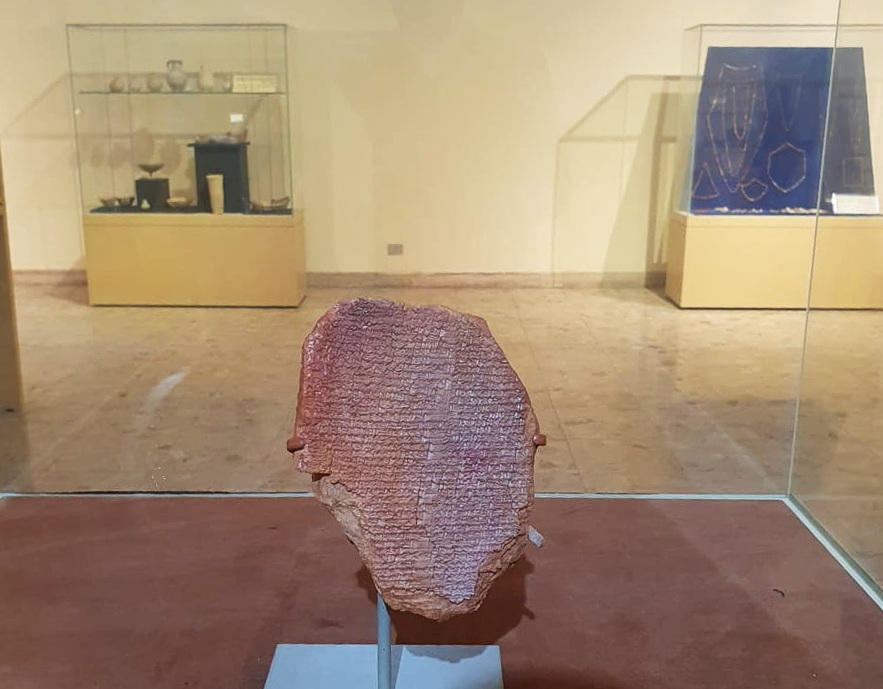
- The Gilgamesh Dream tablet, Iraqi Museum, Baghdad
  28 August – Iraq hosts a regional summit attended by heads of states or representatives from Egypt, Jordan, Qatar, France, Kuwait, UAE and Türkiye.
- 29 August – French President Emmanuel Macron visits the city of Mosul as part of his visit to Iraq that included attending the summit held a day earlier.

=== September ===
- 23 September – The ancient 3,600 year old cuneiform tablet known as the "Gilgamesh Dream Tablet", which was looted during the Gulf war 30 years earlier, is returned to Iraqi custody.

=== October ===
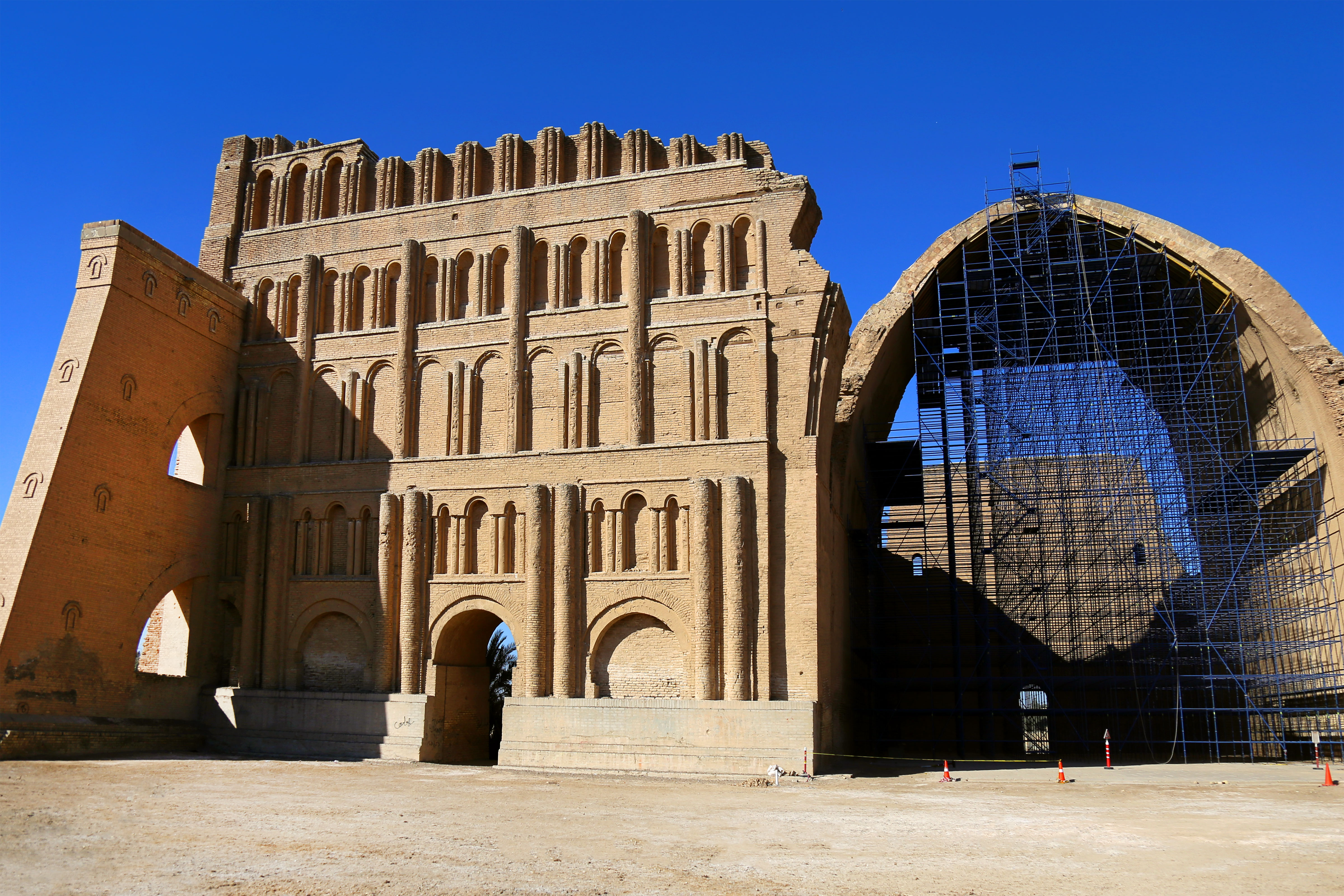
- Renovations on Taq Kasra start November 2021
  10 October – Iraqi parliamentary elections are held amid low turnout and calls for boycott. Moqtada al-Sadr's party earns the most votes securing 73 out of 329 seats in the parliament.

=== November ===
- 5 November – Two killed and more than 150+ injured during clashes in Baghdad between political protestors and security forces.
- 7 November – Iraqi prime minister Mustafa Al-Kadhimi survives an assassination attempt which targeted his residence in the Green Zone in Baghdad with a drone attack.
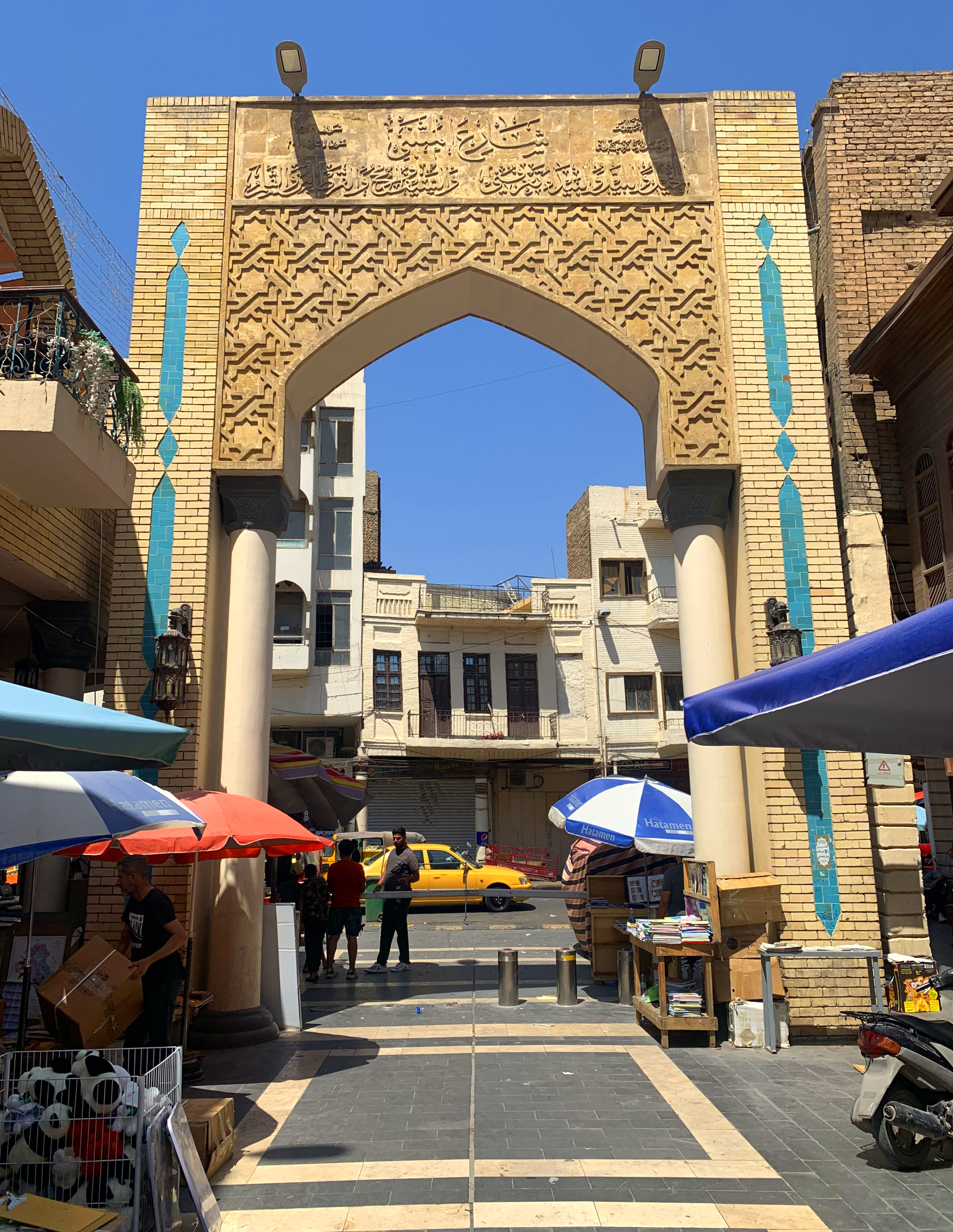
- Al-Mutanabbi Street
  25 November – Iraqi authorities announce plans for restoration of Taq Kasra, a 1,400 ancient Sasanian-era monument, south of Baghdad.

=== December ===
- 7 December – At least four dead and four others injured in an explosion of a rigged motorcycle in Basra.
- 8 December – US president Joe Biden appoints Alina L. Romanowski as the new ambassador to Iraq.
- 9 December – Coalition forces declare end of combat operations and transitioning to an advisory role.
- 25 December – The historical Al Mutanabbi Street is reopened to the public after months of renovation.

== Deaths ==
- 28 January – Abu Yasser al-Issawi, Islamic militant. (b. 1978)
- 15 February – Rowsch Shaways, politician. (b. 1947)
- 28 February – Sabah Abdul-Jalil, football player. (b. 1951)
- 12 March – Khairuddin Haseeb, journalist. (b. 1929)
- 22 March – Zuhur Dixon, poet. (b. 1933)
- 1 April – Nemam Ghafouri, doctor and humanitarian activist.(b.1968)
- 22 ِApril – Adnan al-Assadi, politician.(b.1952)
- 9 May – Ihab Jawad Al-Wazni, activist.
- 23 May – Malik Dohan al-Hassan, politician. (b.1919)
- 18 June – Lamia Abbas Amara, poet. (b.1929)
- 27 June – Imad Abd al-Salam Rauf, historian.(b.1948)
- 2 July – Naïm Kattan, novelist. (b.1928)
- 3 September – Muhammad Saeed al-Hakim, Grand Ayatollah.(1936)
- 18 November – Latif al-Ani, photographer. (b.1932)
- 25 November – Numan al-Samarrai, Islamic scholar and politician. (b.1935)

== See also ==
=== Country overviews ===
- Iraq
- History of Iraq
- History of modern Iraq
- Outline of Iraq
- Government of Iraq
- Politics of Iraq
- Timeline of Iraq history
- Years in Iraq

=== Related timelines for current period ===
- 2021 in politics and government
