= Zuhur (given name) =

- Gender: Female
- Language: Arabic

Origin
- Origin: Arabic
- Meaning: Flowers

Other names
- Variant forms: Zhour, Zhor and Zohoor

Zuhur (Zhour, Zhor, or Zohoor; Arabic: زهور) is a feminine given name in Arabic, meaning "flowers" in Arabic.

== People ==
- Zuhur Dixon
- Zhor El Kamch
- Zohoor Alaa
- Zuhur Gourram
- Zuhur Wanasi
