= List of churches and monasteries in Nineveh =

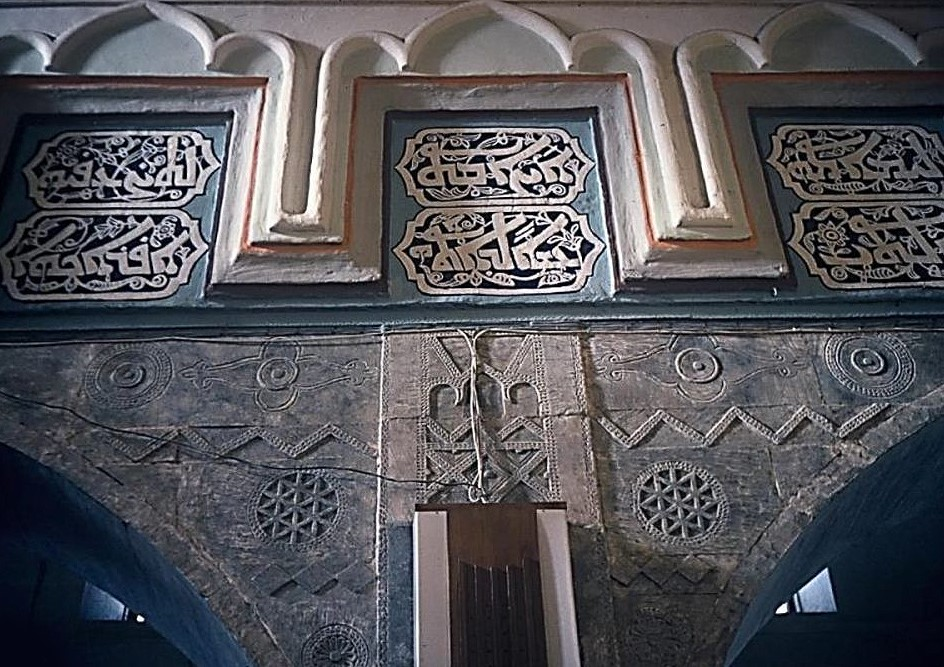
Interior view of the Meskinta Assyrian-Chaldean Church in Mosul

Mosul, Iraq is known for its several old churches, some of which originally date back to the early centuries of Christianity. The ancient churches of the city are often hidden through labyrinthine alleyways behind thick walls and are therefore not easy to find. Some of them have suffered from poor upkeep due to a lack of attendance, and some of them were entirely destroyed during the battle for Mosul and the 4 years of ISIS control the city suffered through.

== Historical churches and monasteries ==
=== Church of Shamoun Al-Safa ===
The oldest church in Mosul, Shamoun Al-Safa (St. Peter), dates from the 9th century and is very difficult to find. It has a deep underground courtyard and a cemetery between high walls containing some ornate tombstones of Maslawi merchants. Previously, it bore the name of the two Apostles, Peter and Paul. It is considered a very important church due to its archeological value. It lies 5 m below street level. The church includes an epitaph of Shammas Raphael Mazagi who established a Chaldean printing press and a Patriarchal seminary next to the church. After the latter has been transferred to Baghdad in 1960, the building was inhabited by the nuns of the Sacred Heart.

=== Church of Mar Toma ===
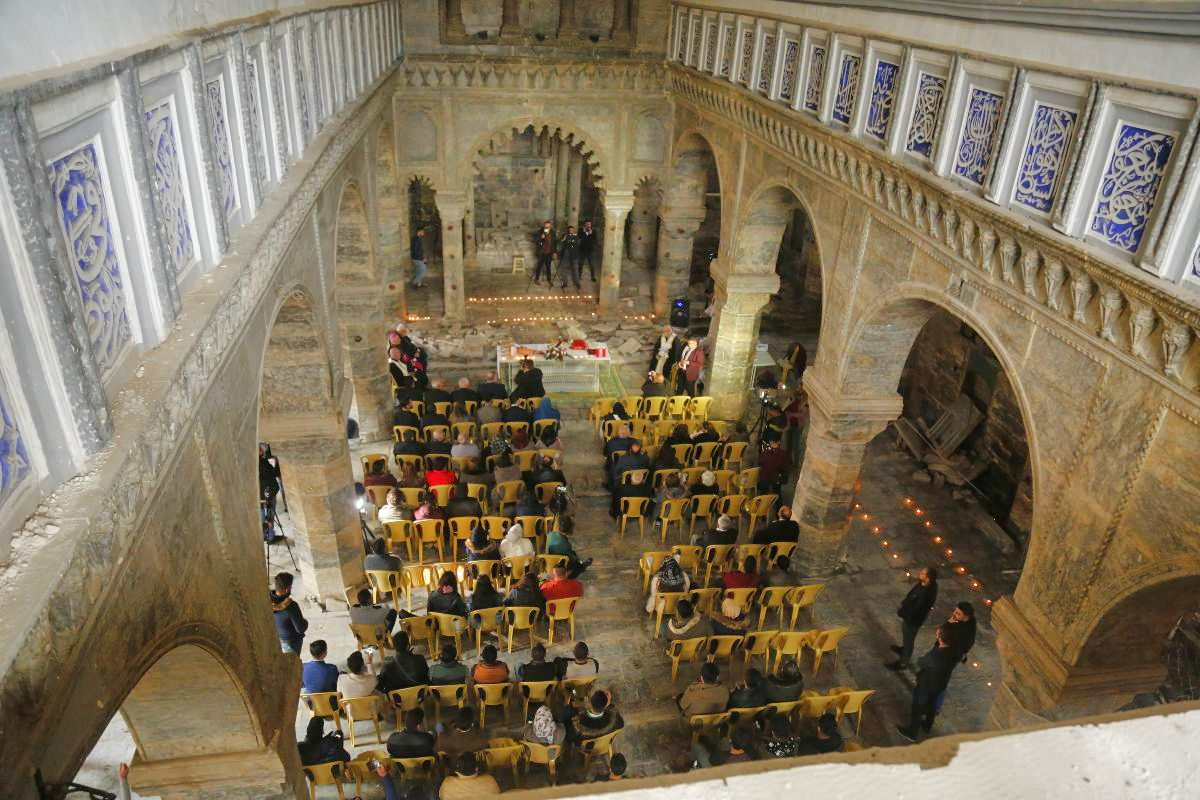
Church of Saint Thomas, Mosul

The exact time of its foundation is unknown, but it can be assumed that the Syriac Orthodox Church of Saint Thomas dates prior to 770, since reference tell that Al-Mahdi, the Abbasid Caliph, listened to a grievance concerning this church on his trip to Mosul. Inside, dozens of bulbs produce a blaze of electric light. The altar-cross as well as the altar-steps are brightly lit. There is an old Bible in Syriac on a lectern and a lime-green one with dark blue borders. And, on one wall, a small illuminated and glass-fronted pigeon-hole in which are the relics of St. Thomas as well.

=== Mar Petion Church ===
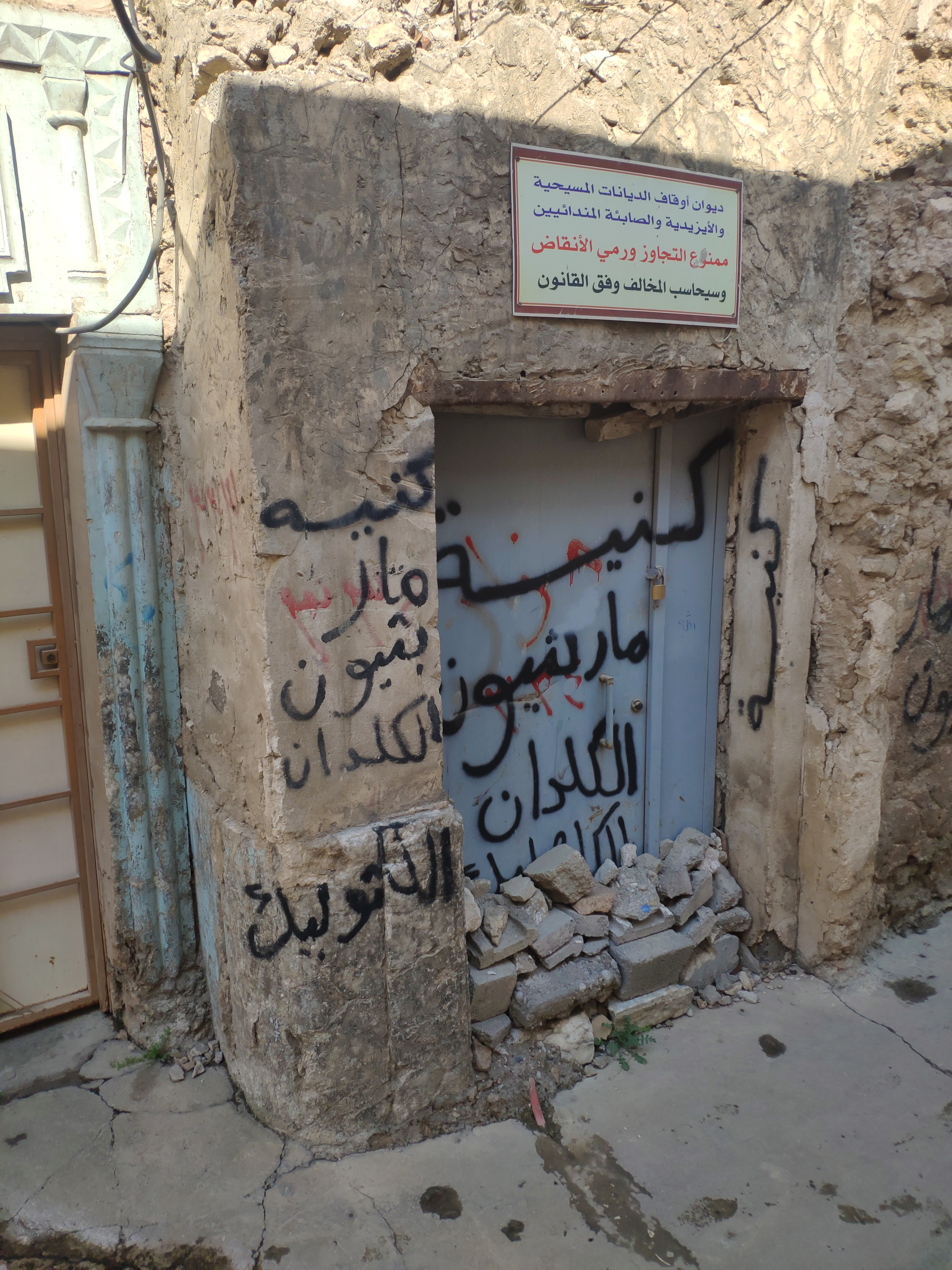
Mar Petiun Church - 2025.

The Mar Petion Church is named after a martyr of the same name who was educated by his cousin in a monastery and died in 446. It is the first Chaldean Catholic church in Mosul, after the union of the Church of the East with Rome in the 16th century. It dates back prior to the 10th century and lies 3m below street level. This church suffered destruction and it has been reconstructed many times. A hall has been built on one of its three parts in 1942. As a result, most of its artistic features have been lost.

=== Ancient Tahira Church ===
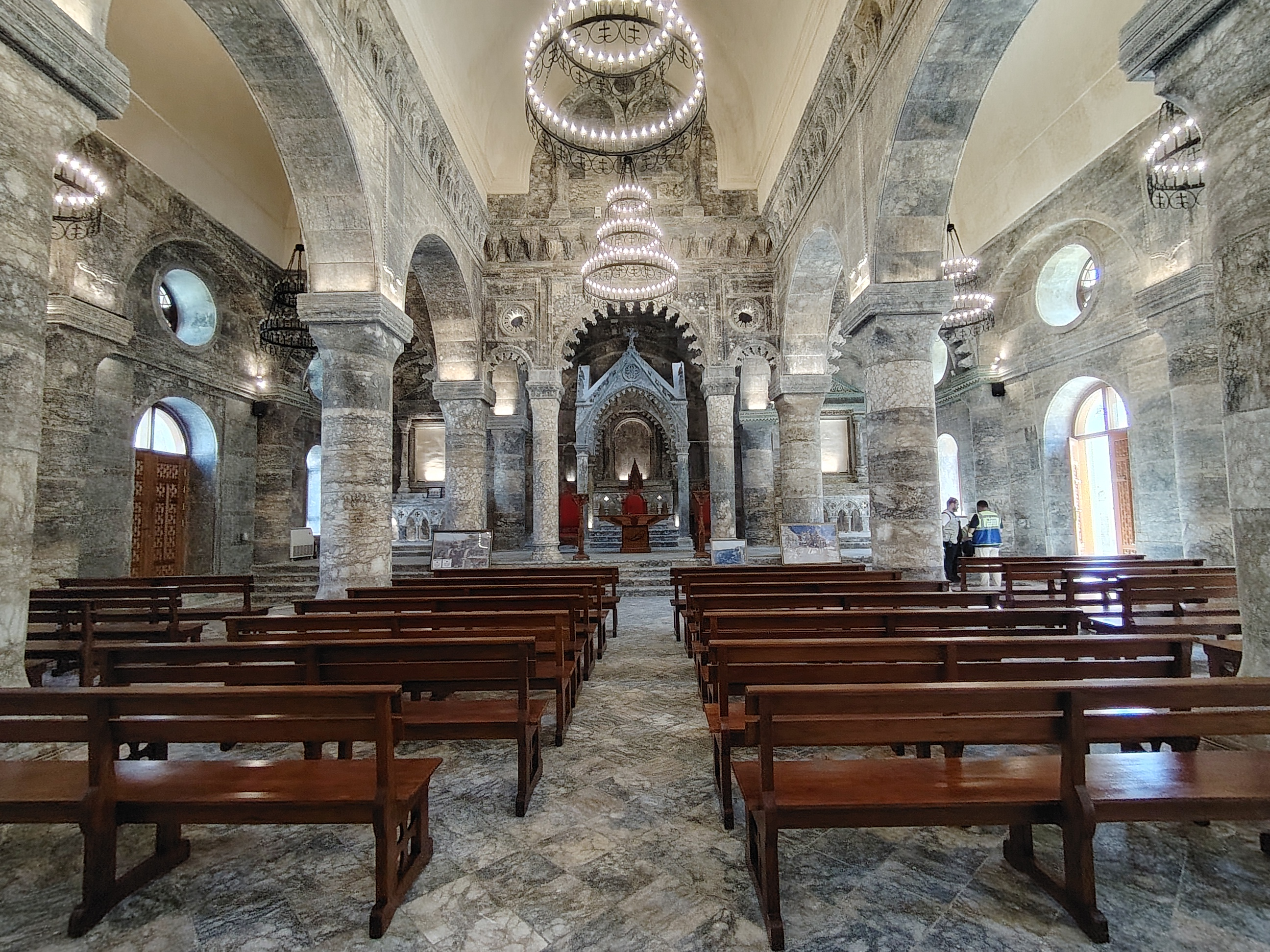
Interior view of the Al-Tahera Church in Mosul

Near Bash Tapia is the Ancient Tahira Church (The Immaculate) which is considered one of the most ancient churches in Mosul. No evidence helps to determine its exact location. It could be either the remnants of the church of the Upper Monastery or the ruined Mar Zena Church. Al-Tahira Church dates back to the 7th century, and it lies 3m below street level. A last reconstruction took place in 1743.

=== Mar Ahudeni Church ===
Mar Ahudeni Church was named after Mar Ahudemmeh (Hudeni) Maphrian of Tikrit who martyred in 575. Mar Hudeni is an old church of the Tikritans in Mosul, dating back to the 10th century. It lies 7 m below street level. First reconstructed in 1970, people can now get mineral water from the well in its yard. The chain, fixed in the wall, is thought to cure epileptics.

=== St. George's Monastery ===
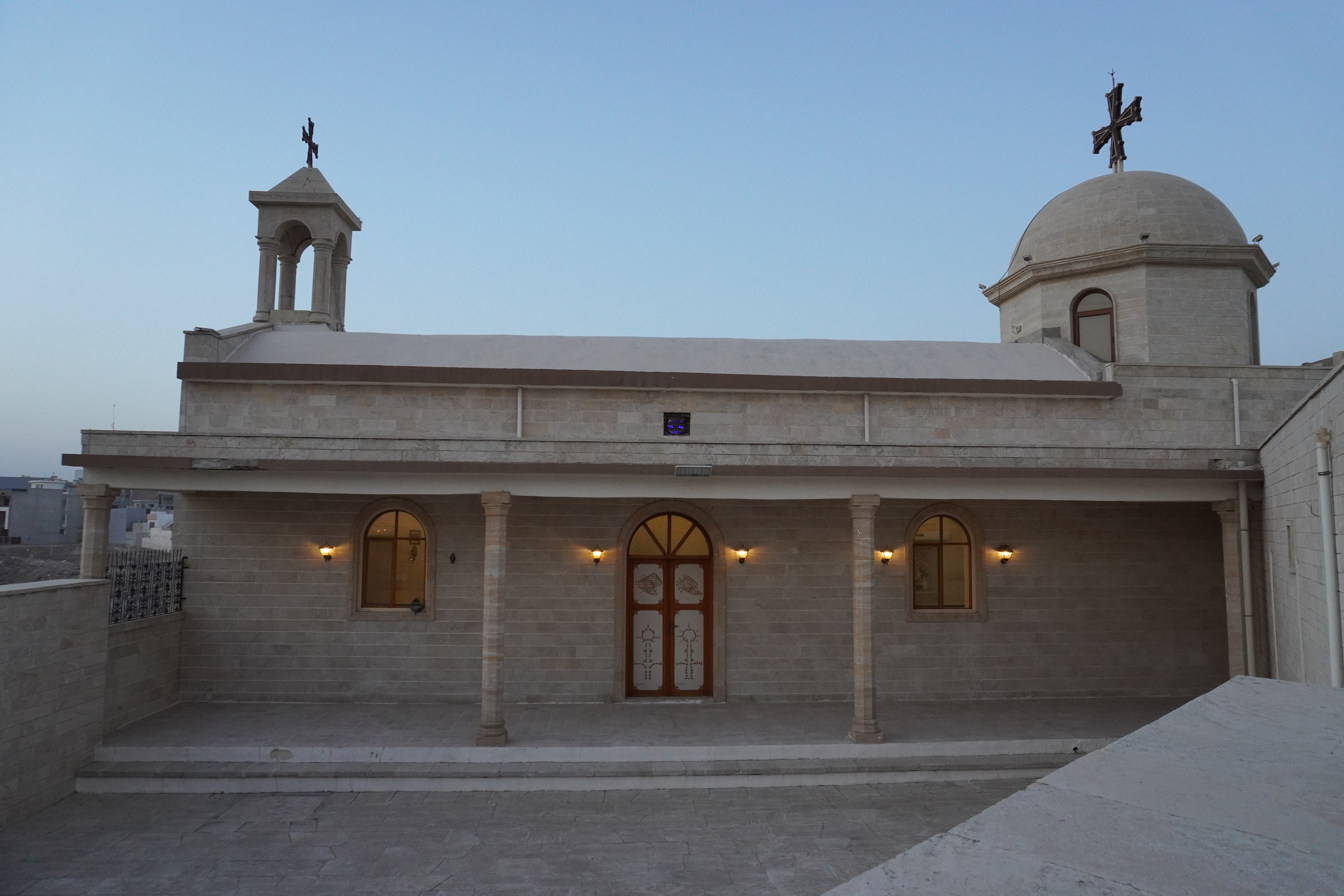
Mar Gorgis Chaldean Church, Mosul

Located in the north of Mosul, St. George's Monastery (Mar Gurguis) was named after St. George. Most probably it was built late in the 17th century. Pilgrims from different parts of the north visit it annually in spring, when many people travel to its surrounding areas on holiday. It is about 6 m below street level. When a modern church was built over the old one in 1931, much of its archeological significance was lost. The only monuments left are a marble door-frame decorated with a carved Estrangelo (Syriac) inscription and two niches which date back to the 13th or 14th century. The church was completely destroyed on 2014 by ISIS militants.

=== Mar Matti Monastery ===
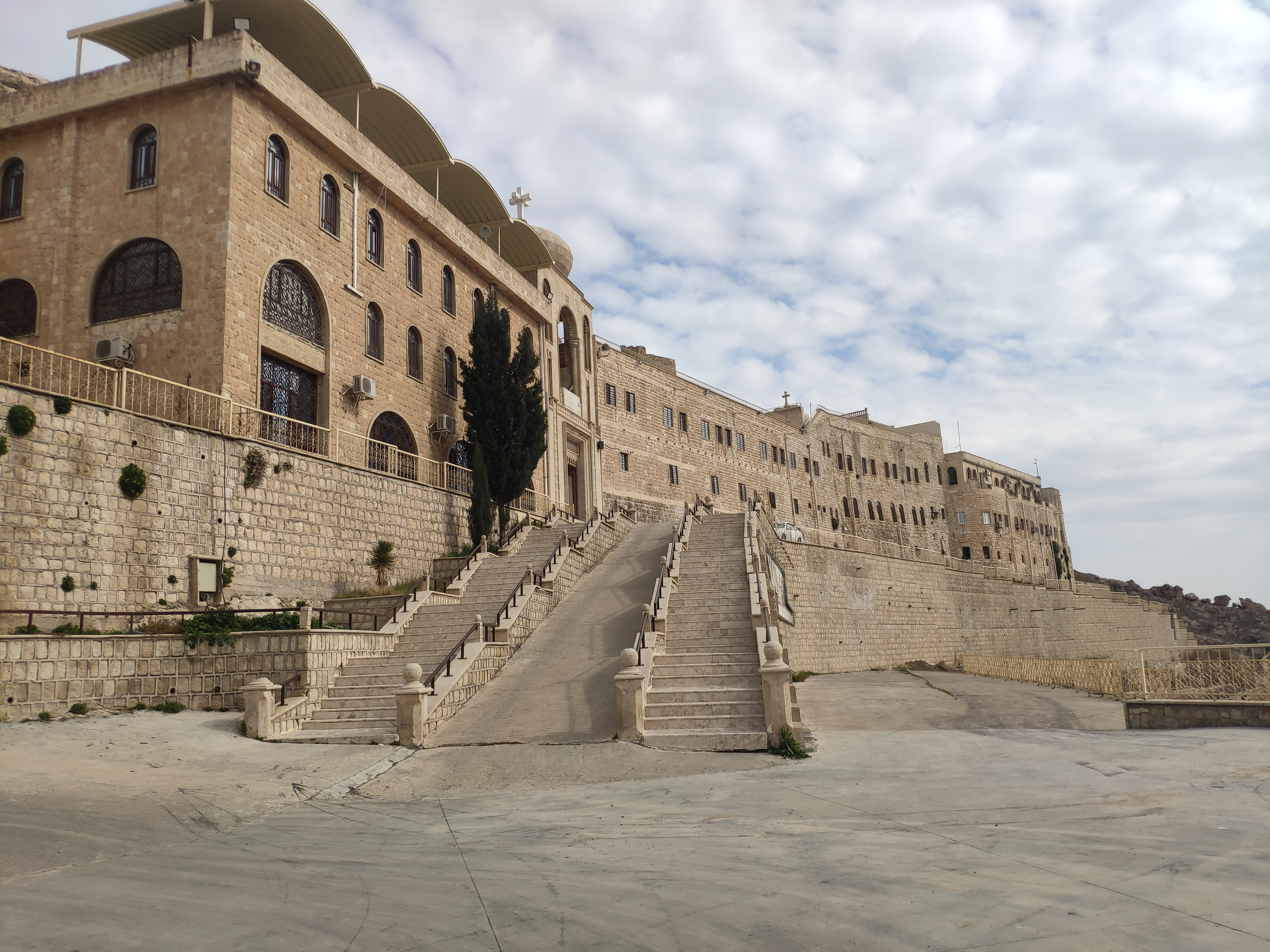
The Mar Matti Monastery

Mar Matti Monastery is a famous monastery situated about 20 km east of Mosul on the top of Mount Alfaf (Mount Maqloub). It was built by Mar Matte, a monk who fled with several other monks in 362 from the Monastery of Zuknin near the city of Amid (Diyarbakır) in the southern part of Asia Minor (present-day Turkey) and the north of Iraq during the reign of Emperor Julian the Apostate (361-363). It has a library containing Syriac scriptures.

=== Monastery of Mar Behnam ===
The Monastery of Mar Behnam is also called Deir Al-Jubb (The Cistern Monastery). Situated in the Nineveh Plain near Nimrud about 32 km southwest of Mosul, it was built in the 4th century and expanded in the 12th or 13th century. The monastery is a great fort-like building rising next to the tomb of Mar Behnam. This was a prince who was killed by the Sassanians, perhaps during the 4th century. A legend made him a son of an Assyrian king.

=== Mart Meskinta Chaldean Church ===
Mart Meskinta Church is a historic Chaldean Catholic church located in Mosul. The church dates originally from the twelfth century but underwent a significant renovation in 1851. It takes its name from a martyred woman named Meskinta, who reportedly defied the shah of the Sassanian Empire, Yazdegerd II (ruled 438-457 CE). It is the only church in Iraq named after this saint.

== Other Christian historical buildings ==
- The Roman Catholic Church (Built by the Dominican Fathers in Nineveh Street in 1893).
- St. Elijah's Monastery (the oldest Christian monastery in Iraq, dating from the 6th Century)
- Mar Michael
- Mar Elias
- Mar Oraha Monastery
- Rabban Hormizd Monastery
- Al-Aqiser

== See also ==
- Mosques and shrines of Mosul
