= Zahawi =

Zahawi or Al-Zahawi is a Kurdish surname meaning 'pride'.

Notable people so named include:

- Nadhim Zahawi (born 1967), British politician
- Jamil Sidqi al-Zahawi (1863–1936), Iraqi poet and philosopher
- Khalil al-Zahawi (1946–2007), Iraqi calligrapher
- Muqbil Al-Zahawi (born 1935), Iraqi artist
- Nadhim al-Zahawi, Iraqi politician and grandfather of Nadhim Zahawi
