= 2021 visit by Pope Francis to Iraq =

Apostolic journey to Iraq

Apostolic Journey to Iraq
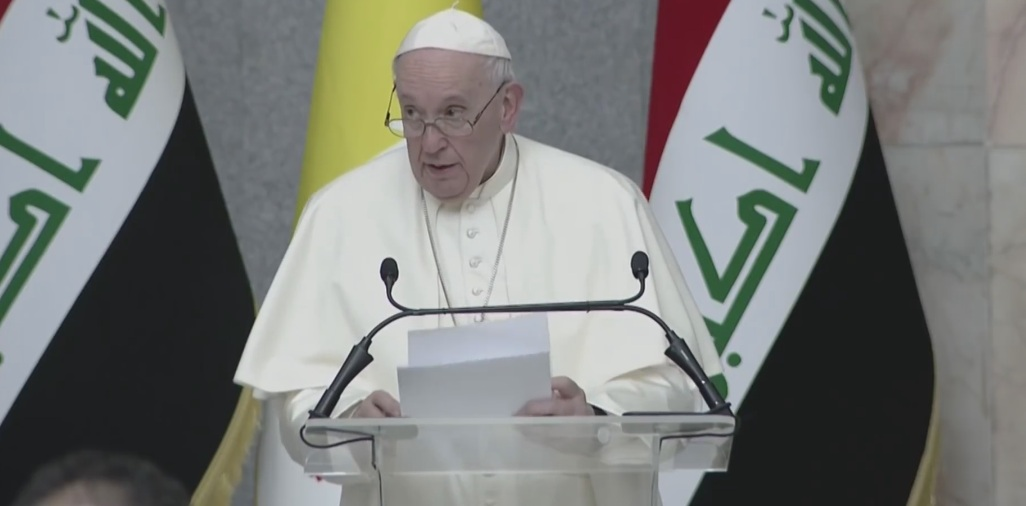
- Pope Francis giving a speech in the hall of the Presidential Palace, Baghdad
- Date: 5–8 March 2021
- Location: Ur Baghdad Najaf Qaraqosh Erbil Mosul
- Website: Vatican website

Pope Francis visited Iraq between 5 March and 8 March 2021. The visit was accorded on following an invitation of the Government of Iraq and the Chaldean Catholic Church. The visit was remembered as an attempt to mend bridges between the different faiths in Iraq. During this first ever journey to Iraq by a pope, Francis visited the cities of Ur, Baghdad, Najaf, Qaraqosh, Erbil and Mosul.

== Previous attempts ==
Pope John Paul II wanted to visit Ur, the birthplace of Abraham according to the biblical tradition within a journey through the Middle East including Israel, Jordan and Palestine but the visit was cancelled due to differences between the Government of Saddam Hussein and representatives of the Holy See which caused the Iraqi government to prohibit the visit.

== Preparation ==
The visit was accorded on following an invitation of the Government of Iraq and the Chaldean Catholic Church.

The preparations for the visit were nearing completion early in 2020, when he met the President of Iraq, Barham Salih, at an audience in the Vatican on 25 January of that year. On the 7 December 2020, the Holy See Press Director Matteo Bruni released a statement confirming that Pope Francis would make an apostolic visit after accepting the invitation of the Republic of Iraq and the Chaldean Catholic Church to visit the Middle Eastern country of Iraq between 5–8 March 2021. It was his first apostolic visit since November 2019 as journeys were cancelled due to the COVID-19 pandemic throughout 2020. Pope Francis mentioned he would arrive as a penitent pilgrim and pray for forgiveness after a long period of interreligious conflicts during the civil war in Iraq. Despite the fact that the Ambassador of the Vatican, Archbishop Misko Leskovar contracted COVID-19 and remained in self-isolation, the Pope wanted to travel to Iraq. During the visit, several security measures were taken to address the COVID-19 pandemic as well as threats of terrorist attacks. A 10,000 security personnel contingent was announced to safeguard the Pope while the pope and the journalists accompanying him were provided with the BionTech Pfizer vaccine. The visit to Ali Al-Sistani in Najaf was prepared with great care to details such as what beverages would be taken or on for how many meters Pope Francis would walk to Al Sistani home. Before arrival, Francis, 20 members of his entourage, and more than 70 journalists who accompanied them were vaccinated against COVID-19.

== 5 March 2021 ==
Upon his arrival at the Baghdad International Airport, the pope was welcomed by the Iraqi Prime Minister Mustafa al-Khadimi. Two children in traditional dresses presented flowers and a military band accompanied the prime minister. Following he entered Baghdad, where his arrival was announced on billboards and the Flags of Iraq and the Vatican flying jointly side by side. When he met the Iraqi president Barham Salih at the Presidential Palace in Baghdad who gave him a welcome gift of a replica from a work of Mohammed Ghani Hikmat depicting the Passion of Jesus before his crucifixion. He then addressed the Iraqi population through a televised speech acknowledging the importance of Iraq as a cradle of civilizations.

== 6 March 2021 ==
On the 6 March 2021 he visited Najaf, where he met the Shia cleric and Grand Ayatollah Ali Al Sistani. The meeting was televised by the Iraqi state TV and took place in the home of Al Sistani nearby the Imam Ali Shrine. They released a joint statement against religious extremism. On the same day he visited Ur, which according to the Bible is the birthplace of Abraham, whom Muslims, Jews, and Christians consider is their religious father. In the evening he returned to Baghdad where he held a mass in the Church of St. Joseph in the Chaldean rite. It was the first time, that Pope Francis delivered a liturgy according to an eastern rite.

== 7 March 2021 ==
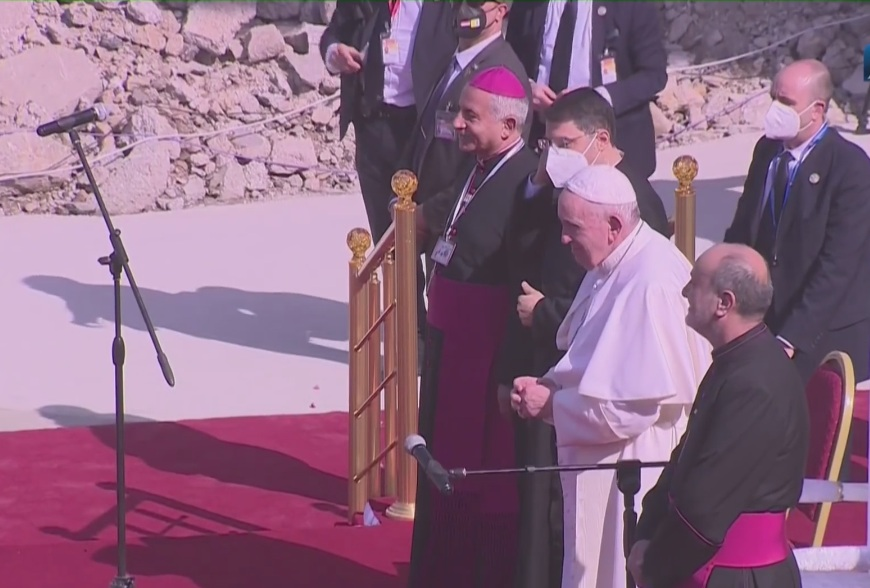
Pope Francis in Mosul on the 7 March 2021

On the 7 March 2021 he visited the demolished Syriac Catholic Church of Immaculate Conception in Qaraqosh. At Mosul's Church Square, which is surrounded by churches of four different Christian groups – the Syrian Orthodox, Syrian Catholic, the Chaldean, and Armenian Orthodox, – he held a mass and prayed for the fraternity between the different religions in Iraq. The location of the gathering was decorated by two symbolic Christian crosses. One was crafted with the wood from the ruined churches in Bakhdida/Qaraqosh. The other one was made by Omar Qais, an Iraqi artist from Mosul. The Pope brought back to Iraq a 500-year old Assyrian prayer book from the Church of the Immaculate Conception in Qaraqosh, which was brought to Italy after ISIL captured the city. The book was restored under the auspices of the Ministry of Cultural Heritage in Italy.

In December 2024, an excerpt from an autobiography by Francis was released that revealed his trip to Mosul had been targeted in a suicide bombing assassination attempt. Francis said that Vatican officials were notified of the plot by British intelligence services and that two bombers, including a young woman, were killed by Iraqi police prior to them attempting the bombings.

The same day, he also visited the Kurdistan Region, where he arrived at the Erbil International Airport and received by the politicians Nechirvan Barzani, Masoud Barzani, Masrour Barzani and Qubad Talabani. He acknowledged the safeguarding role the KRG played for the Christians during the Iraqi Civil War against the Islamic State of Iraq and the Levant (ISIL). In Erbil, he gave a mass in front of 10,000 participants in the Franso Hariri Stadium in Erbil. The attendants wore protective masks against COVID-19, and the stadium was not full as the Government adjusted the number of participants ahead of the mass.

== 8 March 2021 ==
On 8 March 2021, he left Iraq from Baghdad after he met with Iraqi President Barham Salih during a farewell ceremony.

== Influence ==
In Iraq, the 6 March has been declared as a "Day of Tolerance and Coexistence" by the Iraqi Prime Minister Mustafa Al Kadhimi, commemorating the encounter between the Shia cleric Ali Al-Sistani and Pope Francis Upon the departure of Pope Francis, Cardinal Louis Raphaël I Sako announced the pope donated the sum of $350,000 to the Iraqi people of which $250,000 were to be distributed by the Chaldean Church of Baghdad, $50,000 by the Chaldean Catholic Church in Mosul and the remainder by the Syrian Catholic Church which also includes Qaraqosh. Besides the Cardinal has delivered several propositions concerning the enhancement of education, intercultural tolerance and the protection of the holy sites as described in the Iraqi Penal Code in April 2021.

=== Controversy ===
To remember his visit in Kurdistan Region, the Kurdistan Regional Government (KRG) revealed a set of six stamps which included one depicting the head of Pope Francis surrounded by a map which resembled a Greater Kurdistan which includes areas in Turkey, Iran, Syria and Iraq. This led to criticism by Turkey who demanded explications for this "grave mistake" and prosecuted the Kurdish MP of the Peoples Democratic Party (HDP) Berdan Öztürk for terrorist propaganda for defending the issuing of the commemorative stamp. Iran also criticized the stamp, mentioning that the map depicted is contrary to international law. KRG authorities responding to the criticism explained that the stamps did not yet count with the authorization to be printed.

== See also ==
- Christianity in Iraq
