= COVID-19 pandemic in Iraq =

- Disease: COVID-19
- Pathogen: SARS-CoV-2
- Location: Iraq
- First outbreak: Wuhan, Hubei, China
- Index case: Najaf
- Arrival date: 22 February 2020–20 October 2020 (6 years, 6 months and 2 days)
- Confirmed cases: 602,331
- Recovered: 554,990
- Deaths: 24,300 (reported); 100,000-432,000 (The Economist estimate on January 25, 2022)

Government website
- https://coronavirus.iq

The COVID-19 pandemic in Iraq was a part of the worldwide pandemic of coronavirus disease 2019 (COVID-19) caused by severe acute respiratory syndrome coronavirus 2 (SARS-CoV-2). During the pandemic, Iraq reported its first confirmed cases of SARS-CoV-2 infections on 22 February 2020 in Najaf. By April, the number of confirmed cases had exceeded 100 in the governorates of Baghdad, Basra, Sulaymaniyah, Erbil and Najaf.

As of 7 April 2020, officially 28,414 tests have been done in Iraq as a whole (including the Kurdistan Region), with 1202 of them turning out positive. Of those tests, 12,143 were done by the Kurdish Ministry of Health, which means that the other 16,271 were done by the Iraqi Ministry of Health. While 0.25% of the Kurdistan Region's population has been tested, only 0.05% of the rest of the country has been tested, highlighting the possible disparity between total positive case numbers between regions.

== Background ==
Illness is stigmatized in Iraq, and there is concern that this discourages many Iraqis from seeking medical care and getting tested, which may result in an undercount of cases. Quarantine carries an additional stigma. In addition, authorities worry the tradition of washing the body after death could increase the spread of COVID-19.

== Timeline ==
=== February 2020 ===
A suspected case in the province of Dhi Qar was reported in Iraq on 22 February, which was later confirmed to be positive according to a local medical centre, but this was denied by the Iraqi Ministry of Health. On 24 February they reported the first official case in Najaf. The detected case was an Iranian religious studies student in the city of Najaf, some 160 km (99 mi) south of the Iraqi capital Baghdad, and this case was confirmed after laboratory tests carried out during the day.

=== March 2020 ===
The first case of COVID-19 in Iraqi Kurdistan was confirmed on 1 March.

On 3 March, a 70-year-old Iraqi Islamic preacher, Rashid Abdulrahman, became the first fatality in Iraq due to the outbreak. It was reported that the preacher, from Sulaymaniyah District, had chronic heart failure and underlying asthma conditions on top of COVID-19. The next day, his son announced that the preacher had not visited Iran recently.

On 4 March, the country's Ministry of Health spokesman Saif Al-Badr confirmed a second death in Baghdad and 32 cases of the virus. The first recovery was reported on 6 March. On 9 March, the seventh death was announced, which was the first fatality in Basra. The number of cases had also risen to 67. The next day, two new deaths were reported in Babil and Maysan. Iraqi authorities also announced the closure of Najaf Governorate for a week to non-residents.

By 10 March, the figure rose to 71 confirmed cases, as four more people were infected. A total of 15 recoveries were also reported that day by the Ministry of Health. 11 of the patients in Baghdad and four in Kirkuk Governorate had fully recovered from the infection.

The eighth patient died from the disease on 11 March, which was the first death reported in Karbala. By 12 March, the Health Ministry had recorded 79 cases.

On 14 March, two more patients died, increasing the death rate to 10, including the first death of a couple (that had traveled to Iran) in Wasit Governorate. Later, the Health Ministry reported that there was a total of 110 cases, with 26 recoveries.

On 16 March 6 recoveries were reported. There were 9 recoveries on 17 March.

On 18 March, the death toll rose to 12 and 10 new cases were registered from 105 suspected cases. One new death was reported in Basra Governorate. 5 of the new cases came from Baghdad.

The next day, the number of cases increased to 192 with 28 new cases, which marked the largest increase in a single day. One new death and 8 recoveries were also announced. On 20 March 208 positive cases were confirmed and four new deaths were announced, resulting in a total of 17 deaths. 6 new cases were reported on 21 March, which meant that there was a total of 214 positive cases. 2 patients also recovered that day.

On 22 March, three new deaths were confirmed in Baghdad. The death toll increased to 20. There were 6 new recoveries.

On 23 March, three more deaths and five recoveries were reported and the number of cases rose to 266. The Iraqi Ministry of Health announced the first case in Nineveh Governorate, leaving Saladin Governorate as the only governorate without any cases.

On 24 March 50 new cases were registered. The Health Ministry announced that the number of recoveries had increased to 75 and the number of deaths had increased to 27.

30 new cases were announced on 25 March and the number of recoveries increased to 89. Included, was the first reported case in the Saladin Governorate of a woman in the town of Ishaqi, thus' confirming the presence of the virus in all 19 Iraqi provinces for the first time.

On 26 March 36 new cases were reported, as well as 7 new deaths and a total of 105 recoveries. The death toll increased to 36 deaths.

On 27 March, the first cases were reported in Halabja and Saladin governorates, meaning that all governorates had been infected by COVID-19. The total number of cases increased to 458, after 76 new cases tested positive. The death toll also increased to 40, after four new deaths were confirmed. The number of recovered cases also increased to 122.

On 28 March, the total number of cases increased to 506, after 48 new cases tested positive. The death toll also increased to 42, after two new deaths were confirmed. The number of recovered cases also increased to 131.

On 29 March, the total number of cases increased to 547, after 41 new cases tested positive. For the first time in a week, the death toll did not see an increase, as no deaths were confirmed. The number of recovered cases also increased to 143.

On 30 March, the total number of cases increased to 630, after 48 new cases tested positive. The death toll also increased to 46, after four new deaths were confirmed. The number of recovered cases also increased to 152.

On 31 March, the total number of cases increased to 695, after 48 new cases tested positive. The death toll hit the 50 mark, after four new deaths were confirmed. The number of recovered cases also increased to 170.

=== April 2020 ===
On 1 April, the total number of cases reached 728, with 33 new cases. Two new deaths and 12 new recoveries were also recorded.

On 2 April, Iraq's Communications and Media Commission said that it had banned international news agency Reuters from operating in the country for three months for reporting that the number of the nation's novel coronavirus cases were much higher than official figures. It added that the agency was fined $20,000 and asked to apologize due to the story, which has "put social security at risk." 33 new cases were announced, meaning that the total number of cases rose to 772. The number of recoveries reached 202, whilst two new deaths were recorded.

On 3 April, the number of confirmed cases rose to 820, with 226 recoveries. No new deaths were confirmed on this same day.

On 4 April, the number of confirmed cases rose to 878, with 259 recoveries. 2 new deaths were also confirmed on the same day.

On 5 April, the number of confirmed cases saw a daily record increase of 83 new and thus' the total number of cases rose to 961, with 279 total recoveries. 5 new deaths were also confirmed on the same day. The significant rise in cases were attributed to both the capital Baghdad, which saw a rise of 27 cases, and the KRG capital Erbil, which saw a rise of 18 case. The cases in Erbil were attributed to a banned funeral gathering on the 21 and 23 March, with investigations and tests ongoing, the number is set to continue to rise.

On 6 April, the number of confirmed cases saw a daily increase of 70 new and saw the total number of cases rise to 1031, with 344 total recoveries. 3 new deaths were also confirmed on the same day. The majority of those cases, 41 in total, were in the KRG capital of Erbil and 39 of them were related to the banned funeral gatherings that were discovered the previous day. This meant that a total of 71 of the 133 cases in Erbil could be traced back to that gathering.

On 15 April 15 new cases were recorded, which was the lowest number of cases reported in a single day since 21 March. On 16 April 19 new cases were recorded, as well as the 80th fatality.

=== May 2020 ===
Over the course of the month the number of cases increased to over 6,000.

=== June 2020 ===
On 14 June, Tawfiq al-Yasiri died in Al Diwaniyah, making him the first politician in Iraq to die from COVID-19.

On 21 June, Iraqi footballer Ahmed Radhi died at the age of 56 following complications from COVID-19.

Over the course of the month, the number of confirmed cases increased sevenfold: from 6,868 on 1 June to 53,708 on 1 July.

=== July 2020 ===
The number of cases continued to grow exponentially. By 5 July, there were over 60,000 cases.

=== December 2020 ===
On 22 December 2020, Iraq signed a preliminary deal to receive 1.5 million doses of the Pfizer–BioNTech vaccine in early 2021. On 27 December 2020, Iraq's National Medicine Selection authority gave an emergency approval for the use of Pfizer's coronavirus vaccine. The Minister of Health Hassan al-Timini said that the country will receive the vaccines along with special storage equipment needed to store it.

=== January 2021 ===
On 19 January 2021, Iraq authorized the emergency use of the Oxford–AstraZeneca vaccine, as well as the Sinopharm BIBP vaccine.

=== March 2021 ===
In March 2021, Iraq received 50.000 Sinopharm vaccines donated by China and started its vaccination program beginning with the front-line health workers. Then on 25 March, it received 336.000 doses of AstraZeneca vaccines through the UN's Covax program.

=== April 2021 ===
In April 2021, UK contributed in supporting the UNDP to help Iraq fight the coronavirus by committing $4.2 million.

On 22 April, Iraq surpassed one million COVID-19 cases.

On 24 April, the coronavirus ward at Ibn al-Khatib hospital in Baghdad caught fire. There were many fatalities and injuries.

=== July 2021 ===
On 12 July, dozens of people died in a fire in a hospital in Nasiriya. The fire may have been ignited by oxygen tanks in a COVID-19 ICU.

== Government response and impacts ==
=== Curfews ===
On 13 March, the Kurdistan Regional Government imposed a two-day curfew in Erbil and Sulaymaniyah, which later evolved to become a complete lockdown of the entire region of the KRG on 4 April. This was due to a rise in cases attributed to two funeral gatherings. This lockdown meant that apart from a few select pharmaceutical shops working through delivery, all shops would be closed and movement (even walking) banned.

After the first death in Sheikh Saad, Wasit Governorate, the town placed into temporary lockdown after an elderly couple died from the coronavirus on 14 March. On 15 March, a three-day curfew was imposed in Karbala.

=== Education ===
The KRG declared the period of 26 February to 10 March a public holiday for all public and private schools and kindergartens in Kurdistan Region. Public and private universities were closed from 29 February to 10 March. This closure continued for the rest of the academic year and most started online learning.

Primary, middle and high schools had a midterm holiday since 16 February; a two-week holiday was extended for an additional week and then another week. On 18 March, all schools and universities in Baghdad were closed until further notice.

=== Travel restrictions ===
Iraq closed its border with Iran in late February, only allowing Iraqi citizens that were returning, after the pandemic in Iran spread. Between 8 and 16 March, trading with Kuwait was suspended. In response to the outbreak in Iraq, Jordan decided to restrict land and air travel with the country on 10 March. On 10 March, the Kurdistan Regional Government decided to close its border with Iran from 16 March until at least April.

Iraq banned travelers from Qatar and Germany from 13 March in attempt to stop the disease from spreading. Travelers from Iran, Italy, China, France, Spain, Thailand, Singapore, South Korea, and Japan were also on the ban list. On 15 March, the government announced that all flights to and from Baghdad airport between 17 and 24 March would be suspended. The government also imposed a curfew in the capital, Baghdad, over the same period.

On 15 January 2021, Iraq announced a ban on its citizens from travelling to 20 countries where a new coronavirus variant was found.

=== Social issues and impacts ===
On 27 February, schools, universities and cinemas in Baghdad were closed, and other large public gatherings (including major religious gatherings during Rajab) in cities were banned until 7 March. The fear of contagion prevented mourners from burying their dead in communities across Iraq.

Religious gatherings were banned on 13 March in the Kurdish Regional Government, but were not enforced strictly until 4 April, where it was discovered that two funeral gatherings on 21 and 23 March were responsible for a third of all cases in the city of Erbil. On the same day, word got to the government of another illegal funeral gathering in the nearby village of Daratu, which led to the local Zerevani having to lock down the village as a result.

The looting of artefacts in Iraq had been on the rise during the COVID-19 pandemic. Due to the pandemic, few tourists or foreign archaeologists visited historical sites. As a result, many of these areas were left unguarded.

=== U.S. forces ===
On 20 March 2020, the American-led Combined Joint Task Force – Operation Inherent Resolve (CJTF-OIR) confirmed that certain troops would be withdrawing from Iraq due to the pandemic. On that same day, United States Central Command ordered a 14-day "stop movement" preventing any U.S. troops from entering or leaving Iraq and Afghanistan because of the pandemic. The Islamic State of Iraq and the Levant has planned to take advantage of the vacuum in the Syrian Desert caused by the coronavirus-expedited withdrawal of U.S. troops.

== Statistics ==
=== Graphs ===
==== Cumulative number of cases, recoveries and deaths ====
View source data.

==== Confirmed new cases per day ====
View source data.

==== Confirmed deaths per day ====
View source data.

=== Overview ===
The table below shows the confirmed COVID-19 cases in each Governorate of Iraq.

COVID-19 in Iraq by governorates as of October 24, 2021
Governorate	Cases	Deaths	Recovered
Al-Anbar Governorate	19,074	93	18,235
Al-Qādisiyyah Governorate	65,161	755	64,111
Babil Governorate	61,987	992	60,742
Baghdad Governorate	586,300	5,009	571,846
Basra Governorate	205,483	1,465	203,838
Dhi Qar Governorate	90,669	1,558	88,615
Diyala Governorate	75,922	486	74,949
Duhok Governorate	117,669	1,509	110,091
Erbil Governorate	99,235	1,715	89,886
Halabja Governorate	6,540	204	5,871
Karbala Governorate	80,179	914	79,052
Kirkuk Governorate	71,952	1,308	69,231
Maysan Governorate	78,353	867	77,008
Muthanna Governorate	33,147	341	32,133
Najaf Governorate	88,600	706	87,277
Nineveh Governorate	66,649	839	65,283
Saladin Governorate	45,055	456	37,352
Sulaymaniyah Governorate	119,786	2,591	107,760
Wasit Governorate	111,442	744	100,421
Total	2,023,203	22,552	1,943,701

=== Maps ===
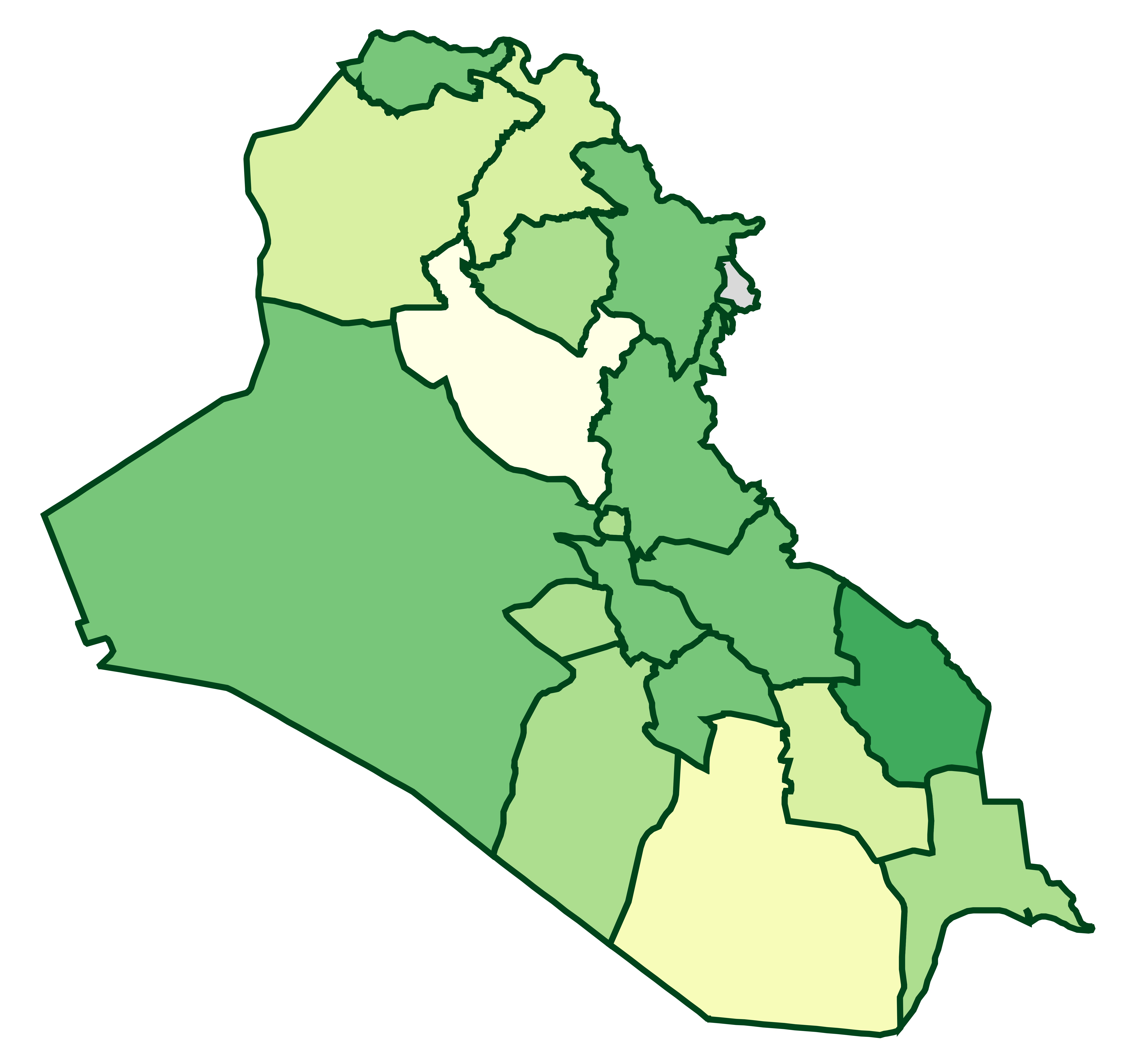
Percentage of inactive cases (including deaths and recoveries) % as of 7 June 2020 0% 1-9% 10-29% 30-49% 50-99% 100%

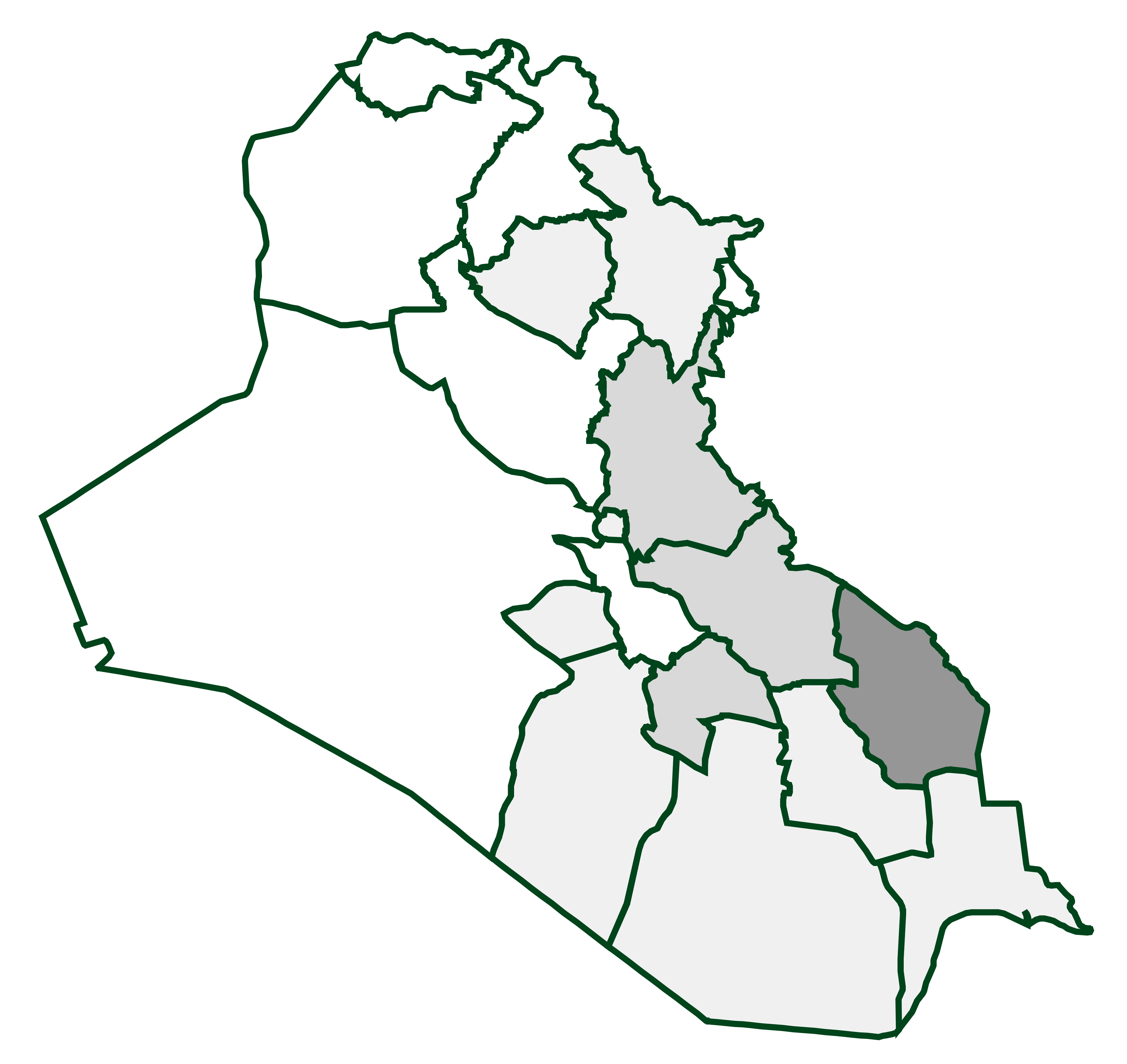
% of Deaths per no. of Confirmed Cases (as of 7 June 2020) 0% 1-9% 10-29% 30-49%

== See also ==
- COVID-19 pandemic in Asia
- COVID-19 pandemic in the Kurdistan Region
- 2020 in Iraq
- 2021 in Iraq
