= Mart Meskinta Chaldean Church =

Chaldean Catholic church in Iraq

Mart Meskinta
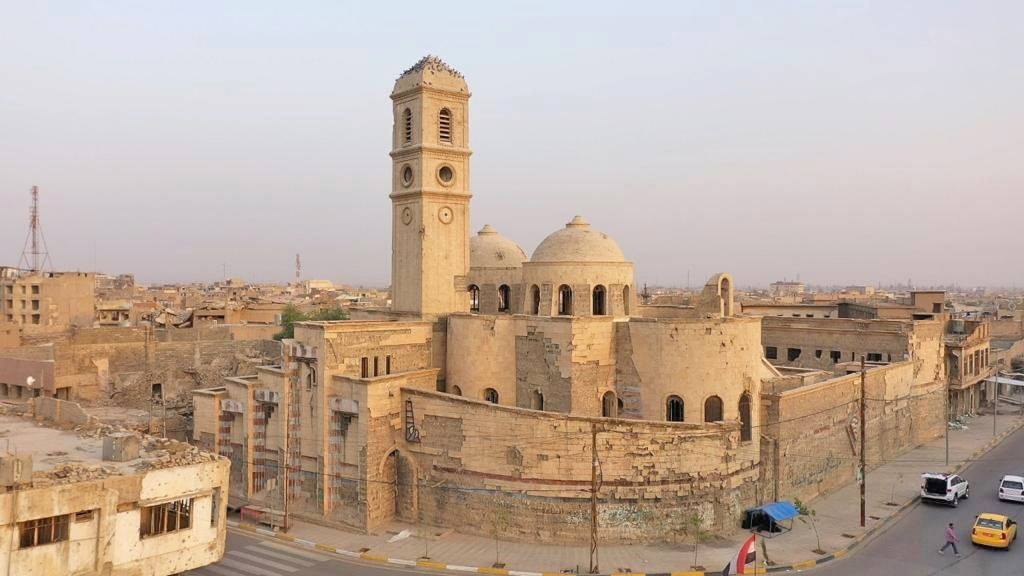

- Location within Iraq

Religion
- Affiliation: Chaldean Catholic Church
- Rite: East Syriac
- Leadership: Chaldean Catholic Patriarchate of Baghdad
- Status: Active

Location
- Location: Mosul, Nineveh Governorate, Iraq
- Coordinates: 36.3385°N 43.1255°E

Mart Meskinta Church, also known as Mart Meskanta, Mart Miskinta, Mart Meskanta, and Saint Meskinta Chaldean Church, is a historic Chaldean Catholic church located in Mosul, Iraq. The church dates originally from the twelfth century but underwent a significant renovation in 1851. It experienced damage in 2008 due to the Iraq War and in 2014-2017 due to the war against the Islamic State (ISIS).

The church takes its name from a martyred woman named Meskinta, who reportedly defied the shah of the Sassanian Empire, Yazdegerd II (ruled 438-457 CE), by teaching local children Christianity in a period when Sassanian authorities were trying to impose Zoroastrianism. It is the only church in Iraq named after this saint. Following a schism within the Church of the East during the sixteenth century, Mart Meskinta became a Chaldean Catholic church.

== History of the Church ==
The first reference to Mart Meskinta appeared in a manuscript written in 1199 or 1212. By the fourteenth century, it was one of at least ten East Syriac (Church of the East) churches in Mosul. Many manuscripts mention it thereafter; references to the church appear in texts dating from 1667, 1681, 1708, 1766, and 1827.

Prior to renovations carried out in 1851, Mart Meskinta was a 10-meters-long by 3-meters-wide single-aisle church. The entrance to Mart Meskinta faced northwest while the altar and baptismal font occupy an alcove on the southeastern wall. After renovations in 1851, Mart Meskinta expanded to encompass a three-aisled basilica measuring 30 meters long by 14.5 meters wide. It ran from northwest to southeast, where the sanctuary was located. This part of the building was also well below street level. In the northeast, separate entrance doors for men and women faced the left aisle. The vault of the main nave with a barrel roof was supported by four pairs of massive, four-edge pillars. Above the sanctuary there was a dome with semi-circular troops. Two Chaldean patriarchs were buried inside the building: Pierre Eliyya Abulyonan (1840–1894) and Yousef VI Emmanuel II Thomas (1852–1947). The church also kept relics of the martyr Meskinta.

By the nineteenth century, the church was serving as the cathedral of the Chaldean diocese of Mosul, although scholars do not know for certain when it achieved this status. By some accounts, the first patriarch of the church interred on its grounds was Eliya V, who died in 1504, although the location of the tomb is not known.

In 1950, the Church transferred the Chaldean Patriarchate from Mosul to Baghdad. Meskinta remained the Chaldean cathedral in the city of Mosul until Monsignor George Garmo, Chaldean Archbishop of Mosul (1980–1999) decided to transfer the regional seat of the church to al-Tahira.

== Post-2003 Developments ==
After the U.S. invasion of Iraq in 2003, political conditions deteriorated in Mosul prompting many Christians to leave the city, and affecting all churches, including Mart Meskinta.

In October 2008, a bomb exploded at Mart Meskinta, making it one of several Mosul churches bombed that year. Around the same time, insurgents kidnapped and murdered the leader of the Chaldean community of Mosul, Archbishop Paulos Faraj Rahho, prompting more than two thousand families to flee the city. Those who stayed included nuns from a convent adjacent to Mart Meskinta, who cared for orphaned girls.

The situation deteriorated markedly in June 2014 when the Islamic State seized control of the city and held it until June 2017. ISIL forces killed many priests and destroyed many churches and monasteries in and near Mosul, creating conditions of fear and insecurity that prompted Christians to flee or to stay at home and to avoid churches. By 2023, only 50 families out of an estimated 50,000 Christians who had lived there returned. Mart Meskinta suffered extensive structural damage during the period of ISIL control, along with dozens of other historically significant structures ranging from mosques and shrines to historic houses. In 2021, one architect catalogued the repairs that Mart Meskinta would need for conservation: these included everything from repair and replacement of the exterior stone walls and floors – basic structural elements – to restoration of damaged decorative carvings.
