= Nadhim Zahawi =

British politician (born 1967)

The Right Honourable Nadhim Zahawi
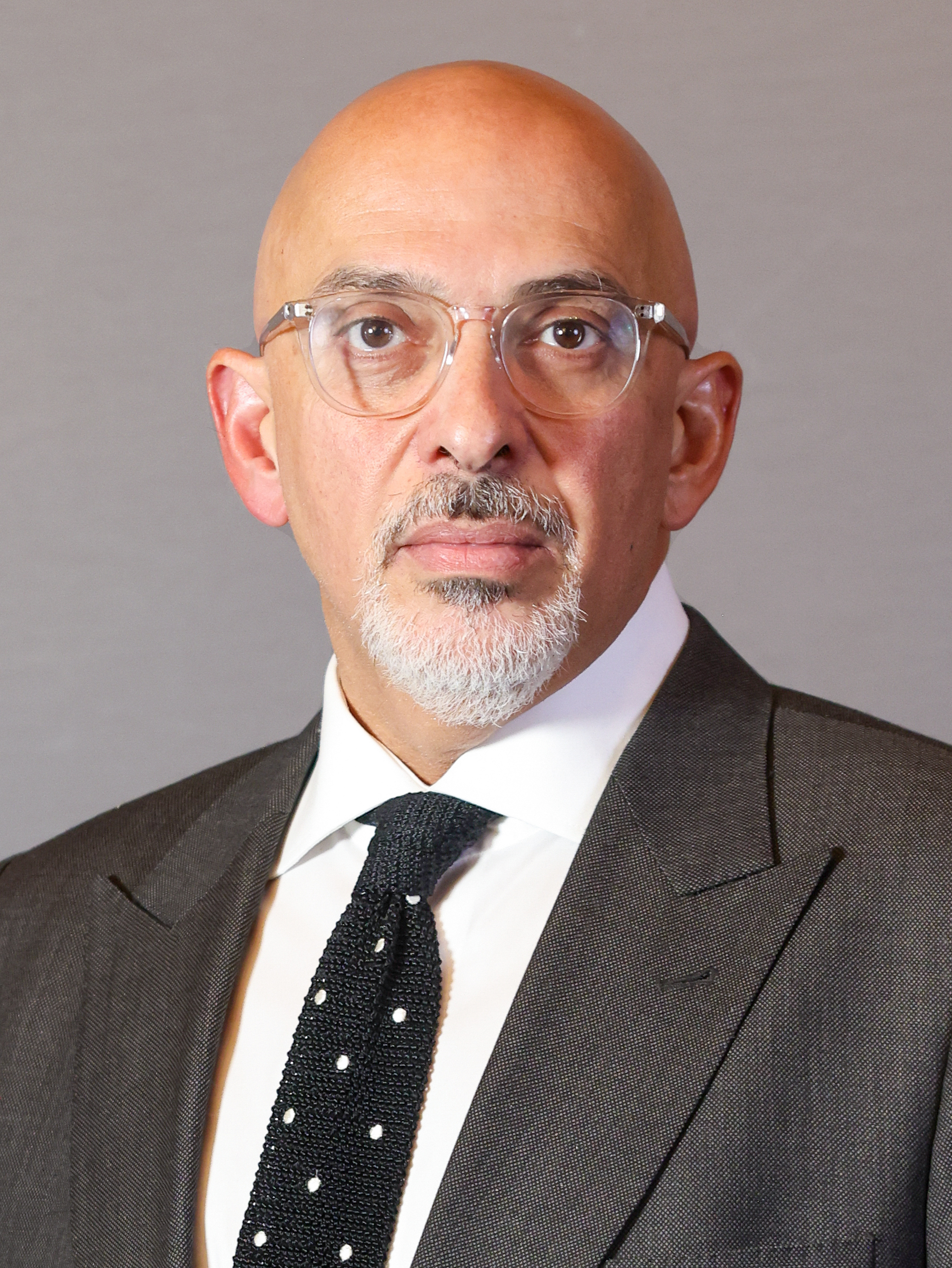
- Official portrait, 2022

Chancellor of the Exchequer
- In office 5 July 2022 – 6 September 2022
- Prime Minister: Boris Johnson
- Preceded by: Rishi Sunak
- Succeeded by: Kwasi Kwarteng

Chairman of the Conservative Party Minister without Portfolio
- In office 25 October 2022 – 29 January 2023
- Prime Minister: Rishi Sunak
- Preceded by: Jake Berry
- Succeeded by: Greg Hands
Other ministerial offices 2018–2023
Chancellor of the Duchy of Lancaster
In office 6 September 2022 – 25 October 2022
Prime Minister	Liz Truss
Preceded by	Kit Malthouse
Succeeded by	Oliver Dowden
Secretary of State for Education
In office 15 September 2021 – 5 July 2022
Prime Minister	Boris Johnson
Preceded by	Gavin Williamson
Succeeded by	Michelle Donelan
Minister for Intergovernmental Relations
In office 6 September 2022 – 25 October 2022
Prime Minister	Liz Truss
Preceded by	Michael Gove
Succeeded by	Michael Gove
Minister for Equalities
In office 6 September 2022 – 25 October 2022
Prime Minister	Liz Truss
Preceded by	Liz Truss (Note: As Minister for Women and Equalities.)
Succeeded by	Kemi Badenoch
Parliamentary Under-Secretary of State for COVID-19 Vaccine Deployment
In office 28 November 2020 – 15 September 2021
Prime Minister	Boris Johnson
Preceded by	Office established
Succeeded by	Maggie Throup
Parliamentary Under-Secretary of State for Business and Industry
In office 26 July 2019 – 15 September 2021
Prime Minister	Boris Johnson
Preceded by	Andrew Stephenson
Succeeded by	Lee Rowley
Parliamentary Under-Secretary of State for Children and Families
In office 9 January 2018 – 25 July 2019
Prime Minister	Theresa May
Preceded by	Robert Goodwill
Succeeded by	Kemi Badenoch

Member of Parliament; for Stratford-on-Avon
- In office 6 May 2010 – 30 May 2024
- Preceded by: John Maples
- Succeeded by: Manuela Perteghella

Member of Wandsworth London Borough Council for West Putney
- In office May 1998 – May 2006

Member of Wandsworth London Borough Council for Thamesfield
- In office May 1994 – May 1998

Personal details
- Born: 2 June 1967 (age 59) Baghdad, Iraqi Republic
- Citizenship: Iraq; United Kingdom
- Party: Reform UK (2026–present)
- Other political affiliations: Conservative (1991–2026)
- Spouse: Lana Saib (m. 2004)
- Children: 3
- Education: University College London (BSc)
- Occupation: Chemical engineer; businessman; politician
- Website: www.zahawi.com

Nadhim Zahawi (Arabic: ناظم الزهاوي, romanised: Nāẓim az-Zahāwī; Kurdish: نازم زەهاوی, romanised: Nazim Zehawî; born 2 June 1967) is an Iraqi-born British politician who served in various ministerial positions under prime ministers Theresa May, Boris Johnson, Liz Truss, and Rishi Sunak from 2018 to 2023. He most recently served as Chairman of the Conservative Party and Minister without Portfolio from 25 October 2022 until he was dismissed by Sunak on 29 January 2023. A former member of the Conservative Party, he was Member of Parliament (MP) for Stratford-on-Avon from 2010 to 2024. As of January 2026, he is a member of Reform UK.

Born in Baghdad to a Kurdish family, Zahawi was co-founder of international Internet-based market research firm YouGov of which he was chief executive until February 2010. A chemical engineer in his earlier career, he was chief strategy officer for Gulf Keystone Petroleum until January 2018. After the retirement of previous Conservative MP John Maples, he was elected for Stratford-on-Avon at the 2010 general election.

Zahawi joined Theresa May's government as Parliamentary Under-Secretary of State for Children and Families in the 2018 reshuffle. Following Boris Johnson's appointment as prime minister, he was appointed Parliamentary Under-Secretary of State for Business and Industry, and in 2020 he was given additional responsibility for the COVID-19 vaccination programme as Parliamentary Under-Secretary of State for COVID-19 Vaccine Deployment. In the 2021 cabinet reshuffle he was promoted to Johnson's cabinet as Secretary of State for Education. On 5 July 2022, he became the Chancellor of the Exchequer after the resignation of Rishi Sunak. Less than 48 hours later, Zahawi withdrew his support for Johnson and publicly called on him to resign, which Johnson did shortly afterwards.

Zahawi was a candidate to succeed Johnson in the Conservative Party leadership election, but was eliminated from the ballot after the first round of voting, and subsequently supported Truss's bid to become Conservative leader. Truss appointed Zahawi as Chancellor of the Duchy of Lancaster, Minister for Intergovernmental Relations and Minister for Equalities on 6 September 2022 following her appointment as prime minister. He was succeeded as chancellor by Kwasi Kwarteng. After Truss resigned in October 2022, Zahawi endorsed Johnson to return to the premiership. After Johnson withdrew from the race, he supported Sunak's bid to become Conservative leader. Sunak appointed Zahawi as Chairman of the Conservative Party and Minister without Portfolio on 25 October 2022 following his appointment as prime minister. On 29 January 2023, he was dismissed from the roles after Sunak's ethics adviser, Laurie Magnus, advised that he had breached the Ministerial Code by failing to disclose that he was being investigated by HM Revenue and Customs while he served in his previous position as Chancellor of the Exchequer under Johnson.

In January 2026, Zahawi defected from the Conservative Party to Reform UK.

== Early life and education ==
Nadhim Zahawi was brought up in a liberal Muslim family from Baghdad. His paternal grandfather was Nadhim al-Zahawi, Governor of the Central Bank of Iraq from 1959 to 1960, and Minister of Trade. His father is Hareth Nadhim Al Zahawi (born 1942), a British-Iraqi businessman who established the Al-Zahawi Group, which after the United States invasion of 2003 obtained a lucrative contract to provide logistics, cleaning and support services to the new US-led interim government. Now known as IPBD ("Iraq Project and Business Development"), its interests have expanded to cover steel manufacturing and property development, and generally "supporting the reconstruction effort". Zahawi's father is also a director of Balshore Investments Ltd, Gibraltar.

When he was nine years old, during Saddam Hussein's rise to power, he and his family fled to the UK. Zahawi was educated at Holland Park School, before moving to Ibstock Place School and then at King's College School, an independent school in Wimbledon, London. He then studied at University College London, where he earned a BSc degree in chemical engineering in 1988.

== Business career ==
=== Business and financial interests ===
In the 1990s, Zahawi was part owner of a Nuneaton-based licensed clothes manufacturer, Allen (Hinckley) Ltd (formerly known as Pagecomp Ltd). The company produced clothing with licensed designs, ranging from Warner Brothers to World Cup '98 to the Teletubbies. Jeffrey Archer invested six-figure sums in the company and would go on to own one-third of the company. By December 1998, the company had collapsed with millions of debt and the loss of around 100 jobs. In 2010, Zahawi stated: "There's a company I have set up and failed in Allen (Hinckley) Ltd. I don't hide my failures".

Following a career as European Marketing Director for Smith & Brooks Ltd, Zahawi co-founded YouGov in 2000 with Stephan Shakespeare. Zahawi was YouGov's CEO from 2005 to 2010.

In 2008, Zahawi became a non-executive director of SThree, a specialist staffing organisation. He was paid £2,917 per month in 2014. He stepped down from the role in October 2017.

In November 2013, it was reported by the Birmingham Mail newspaper that in May 2011 (one year after he became an MP) Zahawi used as a mortgage lender Berkford Investments Limited, based in the low-tax British overseas territory of Gibraltar, to finance the purchase of his constituency home 'Oaklands' riding stables estate (worth at the time £875,000) in Upper Tysoe, near Stratford-upon-Avon, in Warwickshire. Berkford Investments Limited is managed by T&T Management Services Limited, whose services include wealth management. Zahawi responded to the news story by saying: "I did pay stamp duty on my property in Tysoe and have always paid stamp duty on my property purchases. I fully support the 2012 budget and all budgets of this government. I purchased my property in Tysoe with a mortgage from a Gibraltar company. This fact and the details involved are fully declared on the Land Registry and to suggest it is in any way hidden would be factually incorrect. Equally, to suggest that in any way I am using offshore to reduce my tax burden is entirely incorrect."

In 2015, he joined Gulf Keystone Petroleum, an oil and gas exploration and production company, as a part-time chief strategy officer. For his work between 2015 and 2017 for the company, he was paid a total of at least £1.3 million. Zahawi's various roles resulted in him becoming the second highest earning MP in the UK in 2017.

The Guardian reported in early 2017 that Zahawi had spent £25 million buying property around London, for both personal and commercial use. Zahawi said in response that "My first priority, before anything else, is my constituency work and I would never, or have never, let anything get in the way of this."

In May 2024, he became the Non Executive Chairman of The Very Group.

=== Tax and financial affairs ===
In July 2022, it was reported that despite being one of the two key founders of YouGov, Zahawi was issued no founder shares in the company. Instead, he arranged for the founder shares that would have gone to him to go to a Gibraltar company owned by an offshore trust controlled by his parents. Zahawi denied that this was motivated by tax avoidance. He instructed libel lawyers to seek a withdrawal of allegations by tax lawyer Dan Neidle that one of Zahawi's denials of tax avoidance was based on a lie. When asked about his taxes during the 2022 Conservative leadership contest, Zahawi said that he was being smeared.

In January 2023, The Guardian was told Zahawi agreed to pay a penalty to HMRC in relation to his tax affairs. In a statement, Zahawi said HMRC accepted that an error in his tax affairs was "careless and not deliberate". He stated: "HMRC agreed with my accountants that I have never set up an offshore structure, including Balshore Investments, and that I am not the beneficiary of Balshore Investments." Jim Harra, chief executive of HMRC, while unable to speak about an individual's confidential tax affairs, told the Public Accounts Committee that "carelessness is a concept in tax law"; if an "error was as a result of carelessness, then legislation says that a penalty could apply in those circumstances", but that HMRC would not penalise taxpayers who it was felt had taken reasonable care: "There are no penalties for innocent errors in your tax affairs." According to The Guardian Zahawi paid a seven-figure penalty to HMRC over tax irregularities.

Prem Sikka, a Labour member of the House of Lords and an emeritus accounting professor at Essex University and Sheffield University, said of an unsecured loan of about £30m shown by accounts to have been given to Zahawi's wife's UK property company, Zahawi & Zahawi: "There has been no explanation in the accounts of who provided these loans. Given the concern over Mr Zahawi's tax affairs we now need further clarity. The ethics adviser should be looking at these matters too". Dan Neidle, a tax lawyer, said he found the large unsecured loans incredible and he was concerned that the public do not know who gave the loans.

== Political career ==
=== Early political career ===
In 1991, Zahawi and fellow British-Kurd Broosk Saib were aides to Conservative politician Jeffrey Archer during Archer's "Simple Truth" campaign to help Kurdish victims of the Gulf War. Zahawi and Saib were nicknamed "Lemon kurd" and "Bean kurd" by Archer. In 1994 Archer helped campaign for Zahawi for a seat on Wandsworth council. Zahawi also ran Archer's unsuccessful campaign for Mayor of London in 1998.

Zahawi was elected as a Conservative councillor in Putney in the London Borough of Wandsworth, where he served three terms from 1994 to 2006.

At the 1997 general election, Zahawi stood as the Conservative candidate in Erith and Thamesmead, coming second with 20.2% of the vote behind the Labour candidate John Austin.

=== Parliamentary career ===
In February 2010, Zahawi was selected by the local Conservative Association in Stratford-on-Avon as their prospective parliamentary candidate for the 2010 general election. At the general election, Zahawi was elected to Parliament as MP for Stratford-on-Avon with 51.5% of the vote and a majority of 11,346.

In October 2013, Zahawi became a member of the Number 10 Policy Unit. Later in October, Zahawi and fellow member of the Business, Innovation and Skills Committee interviewed Lazard, the Government's independent adviser on the sale of Royal Mail. Shares quickly rose to £5 following flotation at £3.30 and the Financial Times claimed that two investment banks had warned that it was underpriced.

In November 2013, Zahawi apologised after it was reported that he had claimed expenses for electricity used to run the stables on his private estate.

In 2015, while still a member of the Business Select Committee, Zahawi directed a "tough line of questioning" at Post Office CEO Paula Vennells over the subpostmasters mediation scheme, describing her handling of it as "a shambles". As a result of his questioning, he later gained a cameo appearance, playing himself in the 2024 ITV drama Mr Bates vs The Post Office.

Zahawi was re-elected as MP for Stratford-on-Avon at the 2015 general election with an increased vote share of 57.7% and an increased majority of 22,876.

Zahawi is vice-chair of the All Party Parliamentary Group (APPG) on Kurdistan Region in Iraq, which receives secretarial support from Gulf Keystone Petroleum International, an oil company of which Zahawi was Chief Strategy Officer. Concerns were raised about how MPs' independence might be compromised by such links between APPGs and private companies, and specifically about how Zahawi's connections with the oil industry affect his role as MP.

He backed Britain's withdrawal from the European Union, arguing that the European Union will never be willing to change its rules and that the United Kingdom should take back control over a variety of issues.

At the snap 2017 general election, Zahawi was again re-elected, with an increased vote share of 62.2% and a decreased majority of 20,958.

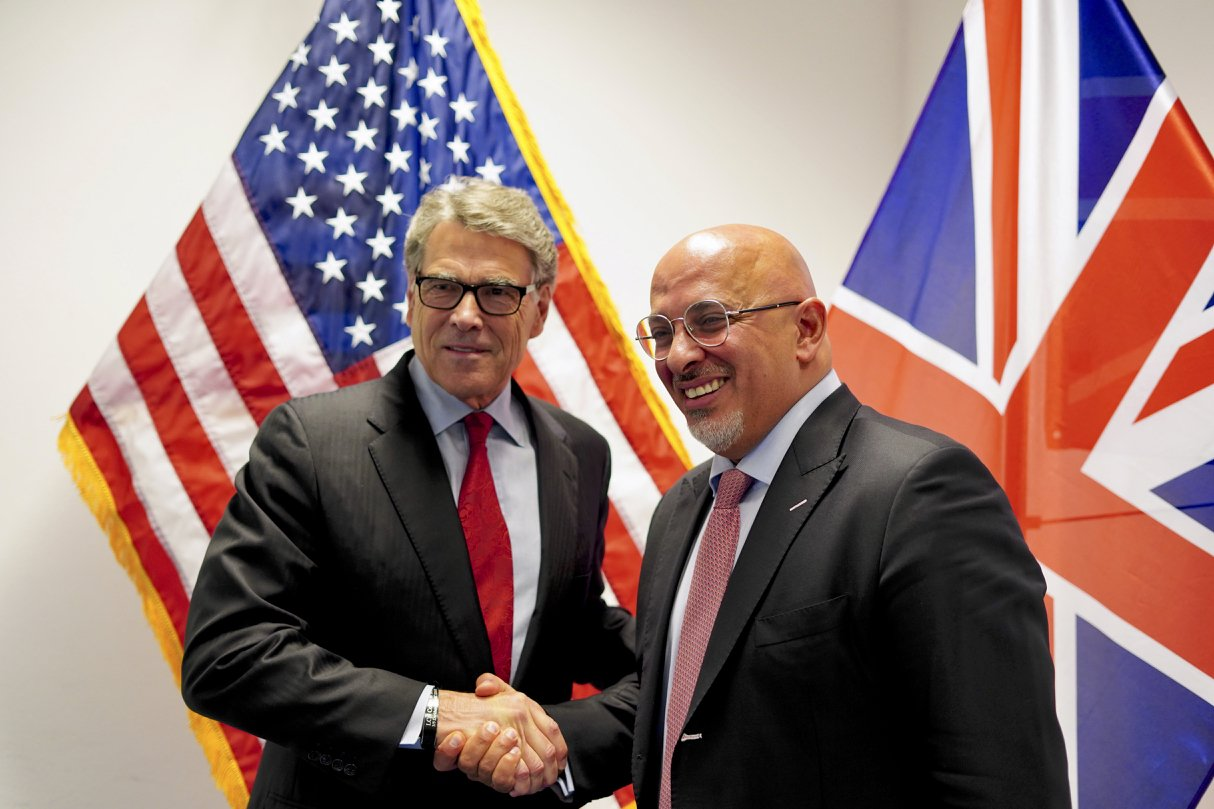
Zahawi and US Secretary of Energy Rick Perry in 2019

Following the 2018 cabinet reshuffle, Zahawi was appointed by Theresa May as Parliamentary Under-Secretary of State at the Department for Education. On 26 July 2019 he was appointed Parliamentary Under-Secretary of State for Industry by new Prime Minister Boris Johnson.

During the time he was on the Foreign Affairs Select Committee he was also chairman of the secretive transatlantic group Le Cercle but did not declare his membership. In 2019 a member of his staff, Beverley Gaynor, was listed as an administrator of Le Cercle in the Parliamentary Register of interests.

Zahawi was again re-elected at the 2019 general election, with a decreased vote share of 60.6% and a decreased majority of 19,972.

In October 2020, Zahawi was accused by Labour MP Tulip Siddiq of misleadingly suggesting that research from a holiday food and activities club pilot scheme had shown parents "actually prefer to pay a modest amount, £1 or £2", instead of receiving free school meals, in a debate over extending free school meals during school holidays.

On 1 April 2023, he was re-selected for Stratford-on-Avon at the 2024 general election. On 9 May 2024, Zahawi announced he would stand down at the next election.

=== COVID-19 Vaccines Minister ===
Zahawi became the first Parliamentary Under-Secretary of State for COVID-19 Vaccine Deployment in November 2020, reducing his role as Parliamentary Under-Secretary of State for Business and Industry in a joint ministry between that and the Department for Health and Social Care. He said there were "caveats" to reopen society and the impact of vaccination on transmission is not known as of January 2021. He said in February 2021 there were no plans to introduce vaccine passports to travel abroad, describing them as "discriminatory", and that people could talk to their doctor if they needed written evidence to travel. In July 2021, the government announced plans to introduce domestic COVID-19 vaccine passports from September as a condition of entry to nightclubs and some other venues with large crowds. After he had left the role, he tested positive for COVID-19 in January 2022.

=== Secretary of State for Education ===
On 15 September 2021, Zahawi replaced Gavin Williamson as Secretary of State for Education in a cabinet reshuffle and was sworn in as a member of the Privy Council of the United Kingdom on 20 September 2021 at Balmoral Castle.

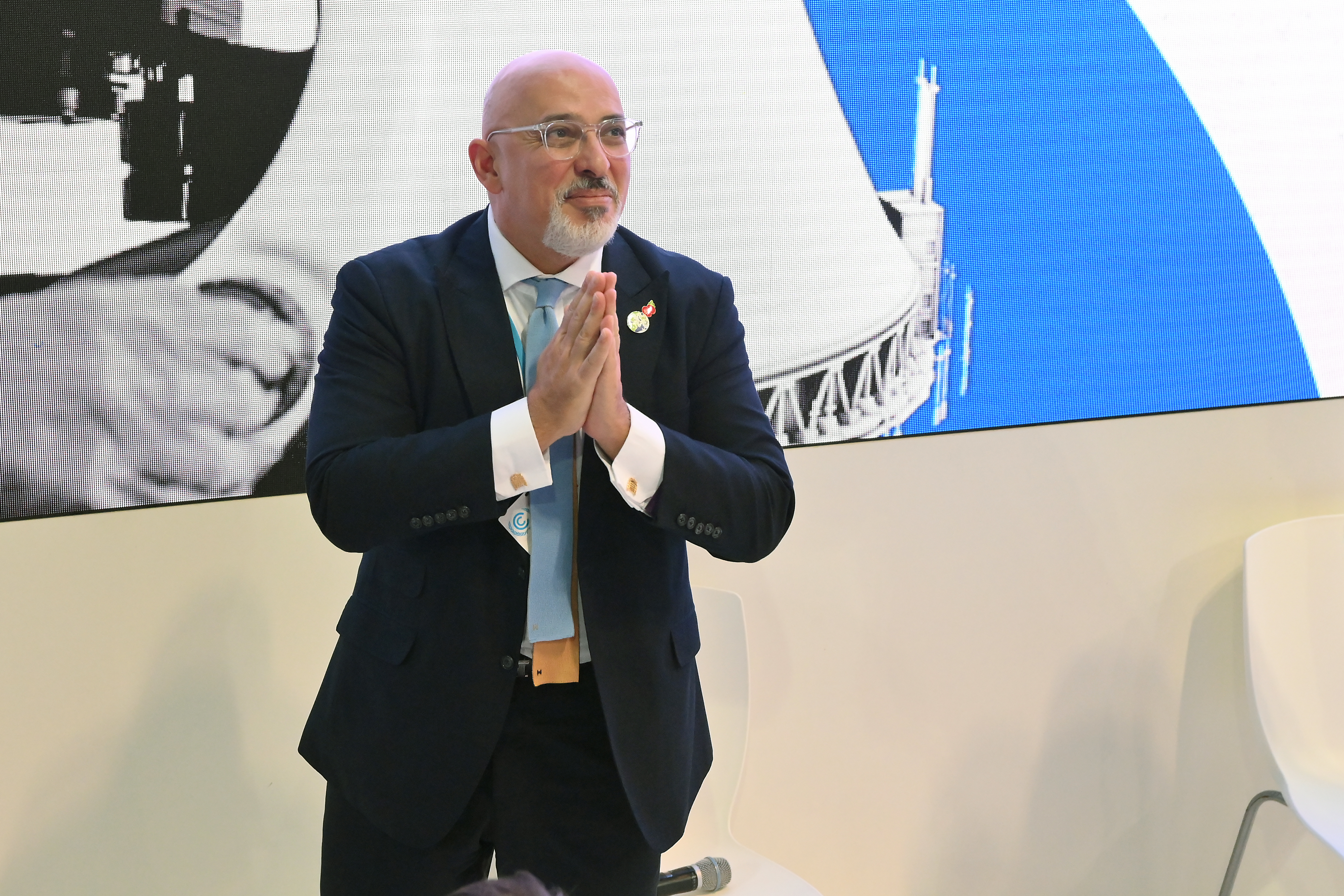
Zahawi at COP26 in 2021

During the COP26 conference in 2021, Zahawi announced a youth award scheme to tackle climate change, similar to The Duke of Edinburgh's Awards. Pupils will be encouraged to boost the biodiversity of their schools by taking initiatives such as erecting bird feeders. Young people will be given a new Climate Leader's Award for any positive work on protecting the environment, with a nationwide ceremony held each year.

In 2022, Zahawi drew up guidance on how to accommodate transgender pupils with input from Suella Braverman, the then attorney-general. He suggested that schools could allow, for example, children to use lavatories and changing facilities of their gender identity if it differs from their biological sex only when they are not in use by others. Braverman, however, disagreed with the idea. Zahawi also criticised a school where a female pupil had critically questioned a speaker after a talk on transphobia in October 2021. The girl was later subjected to swearing and spitting by her peers and had to leave the school, without completing her A-levels. Zahawi called the incident "hugely concerning" and "unacceptable".

=== Chancellor of the Exchequer ===
He was promoted to Chancellor of the Exchequer on 5 July 2022 following the resignation of Rishi Sunak earlier that day. Prior to his appointment, officials of the Cabinet Office's propriety and ethics team had alerted the prime minister of a HMRC "flag" concerning Zahawi's tax affairs. When The Guardian reported on this four days after this appointment, a spokesperson for the chancellor said all his "financial interests have been properly and transparently declared".

The day following his promotion, members of the Cabinet, including Zahawi and Home Secretary Priti Patel, had gathered inside 10 Downing Street to call on Johnson to resign. Zahawi called for Johnson's resignation in the morning of 7 July 2022, despite previously supporting Johnson and accepting an appointment as Chancellor less than 48 hours earlier. Zahawi said he had told Johnson that "the country deserves a government that is not only stable, but which acts with integrity. Prime Minister, you know in your heart what the right thing to do is, and go now."

=== 2022 Conservative Party leadership elections ===
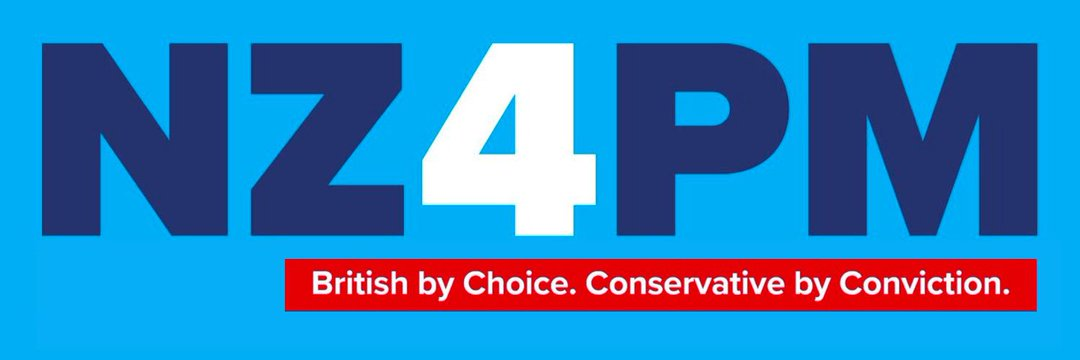
Logo for Zahawi's leadership bid

On 9 July 2022, Zahawi announced his candidacy in the July 2022 Conservative Party leadership election saying he planned to "steady the ship and to stabilise the economy" by reviving low-tax Thatcherism. Former Northern Ireland Secretary Brandon Lewis endorsed him stating he "delivers and gets things done".

While taking part in the leadership contest Zahawi was alleged to be under investigation by HMRC after an inquiry was initially launched in 2020 by the National Crime Agency. In response, Zahawi denied being aware that he was under investigation by the Serious Fraud Squad, the National Crime Agency and HMRC and said he was being smeared.

On 13 July 2022, Zahawi was eliminated from the contest after failing to secure the support of 30 MPs required to reach the next round. He later endorsed Liz Truss in the election.

Following Truss's resignation in October 2022 Zahawi initially announced his support for Boris Johnson's leadership bid, stating "I'm backing Boris. He got the big calls right…Britain needs him back. We need to unite to deliver on our manifesto". Minutes after Johnson announced he would not be running, The Telegraph published an article from Zahawi entitled "Get ready for Boris 2.0, the man who will make the Tories and Britain great again". The article was subsequently deleted and hours later, Zahawi announced he was backing Rishi Sunak.

=== Chancellor of the Duchy of Lancaster ===
On 6 September 2022, under the new Truss Ministry, Zahawi was replaced by Kwasi Kwarteng as Chancellor and instead appointed Chancellor of the Duchy of Lancaster, Minister for Equalities (Government Equalities Office) and Minister for Intergovernmental Relations (Cabinet Office).

Zahawi was replaced in the Sunak Ministry as Chancellor of the Duchy of Lancaster by Oliver Dowden on 25 October 2022.

=== Chairman of the Conservative Party ===
On 25 October 2022, Zahawi was made Chairman of the Conservative Party and minister without portfolio upon Rishi Sunak becoming prime minister.

In December 2022, Zahawi said nurses should call off their strikes and pay demands because it risked playing into the hands of Vladimir Putin, who he said, wanted to fuel inflation. He called on unions representing nurses and other medical workers to enter into talks – though the Royal College of Nursing (RCN) said that it was government ministers who were refusing to open any negotiations over the NHS pay deal.

=== Ministerial code breaches and dismissal ===
Zahawi's tax arrangements attracted further public attention in January 2023. This led to widespread review of statements that he had made and his correspondence with investigating journalists. The Prime Minister asked Laurie Magnus, the Independent Adviser on Ministers' Interests, to investigate Zahawi's personal financial arrangements and declarations. The report identified seven breaches of the Ministerial Code and was published on 29 January 2023. The Prime Minister dismissed Zahawi immediately, following the report from the Independent Adviser. Zahawi's reply did not mention the breaches or contain an apology for them.

Zahawi failed to declare the HMRC investigation to his permanent secretary, and failed to disclose it in his ministerial declaration of interests. He also failed to disclose it to Prime Ministers Boris Johnson, Liz Truss and Rishi Sunak. In July 2022, Zahawi had said publicly "There have been news stories over the last few days which are inaccurate, unfair and are clearly smears." He did not correct this until January 2023. Magnus found this "inconsistent with the requirement for openness" on ministers.

=== Backbencher ===
Following his departure from government, Zahawi became a backbencher. In April 2023, he was reselected for the next general election. In November 2023, David Spencer resigned from the executive of Zahawi's local Conservative Association, intending to challenge him at the 2024 general election. On 9 May 2024, Zahawi announced he would stand down at the next election.

=== Defection to Reform UK ===
Zahawi's defection to Reform UK was announced by Nigel Farage on 12 January 2026. Zahawi declared that the country needed "a Glorious Revolution to get us back to a sovereign parliament", and said problems with free speech "on X or even just down the pub" was one of the reasons he was joining Reform.

When asked on 12 January 2026 about allegations of racism by Farage, Zahawi responded by saying, "If I thought this man [Nigel Farage] sitting next to me in any way had an issue with people of my colour, or my background... I wouldn't be sitting next to him."

It was reported at the time that Zahawi was in discussion with the Conservative Party about a peerage to the House of Lords in the weeks prior to defecting.

== Personal life ==
Zahawi married his wife Lana in 2004. He has three children. A keen rider and show jumper, Zahawi owns and runs a riding school with his wife. He is a member of the private members' club Soho House.

=== US travel ban ===
Following then US President Donald Trump's 2017 Executive Order 13769 that banned travellers from a number of Muslim-majority countries, Zahawi reported that, despite being a British citizen, he was unable to enter the United States, as he was born in Iraq. The ban also affected his wife. According to a media report, this prevented Zahawi from visiting his children attending university in the US.

Zahawi spoke out against the policy and urged that the UK should not turn a blind eye to it. He also argued that the travel ban and then prime minister Theresa May's failure to condemn it only fuelled support for the Islamic State in Iraq and other countries.

=== Attendance at a Presidents Club charity dinner ===
In January 2018, it was reported in the media that Zahawi was one of the attendees at a men-only dinner event organised by the Presidents Club at the Dorchester Hotel in London. Media reports alleged that female hostesses were subjected to sexual harassment and incidents of groping and inappropriate touching. Following the revelations of his attendance at the event, Zahawi posted a tweet condemning such behaviour and stated that he felt uncomfortable at what he saw happening. He has also stated that he will never attend such a men-only event again. In response, opposition politicians, including the Shadow Secretary of State for Education, Angela Rayner, called for Zahawi to step down from his position as Parliamentary Under-Secretary in the Department of Education as he did not report his concerns about unlawful behaviour at the event to the police and because he had attended the event before on several occasions.

== Bibliography ==
- Nadhim Zahawi, The Boy from Baghdad : My Journey from Waziriyah to Westminster, London: HarperCollins, 2024. ISBN 978-000-864069-9

Parliament of the United Kingdom
Preceded by John Maples	Member of Parliament for Stratford-on-Avon; 2010–2024	Succeeded by Manuela Perteghella
Political offices
Preceded by Robert Goodwill	Parliamentary Under-Secretary of State for Children and Families; 2018–2019	Succeeded by Kemi Badenoch
Preceded by Andrew Stephenson	Parliamentary Under-Secretary of State for Business and Industry; 2019–2021	Succeeded by Lee Rowley
Position established	Parliamentary Under-Secretary of State for COVID-19 Vaccine Deployment; 2020–2021	Succeeded by Maggie Throup
Preceded by Gavin Williamson	Secretary of State for Education; 2021–2022	Succeeded by Michelle Donelan
Preceded by Rishi Sunak	Chancellor of the Exchequer; 2022	Succeeded by Kwasi Kwarteng
Preceded by Kit Malthouse	Chancellor of the Duchy of Lancaster; 2022	Succeeded by Oliver Dowden
Preceded by Michael Gove	Minister for Intergovernmental Relations; 2022	Succeeded by Michael Gove
Preceded by Liz Truss as Minister for Women and Equalities	Minister for Equalities; 2022	Succeeded by Kemi Badenoch as Minister for Women and Equalities
Preceded by Jake Berry	Minister without Portfolio; 2022–2023	Succeeded by Greg Hands
Party political offices
Preceded by Jake Berry	Chairman of the Conservative Party; 2022–2023	Succeeded by Greg Hands
