= COVID-19 pandemic in the Kurdistan Region =

Ongoing COVID-19 viral pandemic in the Kurdistan Region, Iraqi Kurdistan

- Kurdistan Region in dark red; Disputed territories controlled by the Iraqi federal government in light red
- Disease: COVID-19
- Pathogen: SARS-CoV-2
- Location: Kurdistan Region
- First outbreak: Wuhan, Hubei, China
- Arrival date: 1 March 2020 (6 years, 2 months, 2 weeks and 3 days)
- Confirmed cases: 230,263
- Recovered: 198,457
- Deaths: 4,770

Government website
- GOV.KRD

The COVID-19 pandemic in the Kurdistan Region is part of the ongoing worldwide pandemic of coronavirus disease 2019 (COVID-19) caused by severe acute respiratory syndrome coronavirus 2 (SARS-CoV-2). The COVID-19 disease was first confirmed to have reached the Kurdistan Region, an autonomous region of Iraq, on 1 March 2020.

== Background ==
On 12 January 2020, the World Health Organization (WHO) confirmed that a novel coronavirus was the cause of a respiratory illness in a cluster of people in Wuhan City, Hubei Province, China, which was reported to the WHO on 31 December 2019.

The case fatality ratio for COVID-19 has been much lower than SARS of 2003, but the transmission has been significantly greater, with a significant total death toll.

== Timeline ==
=== March 2020 ===
On 1 March, the first case in the Kurdistan Region was confirmed.

=== August 2020 ===
On 5 August, the Kurdistan Region reached a total of 15,577 COVID-19 cases.

== See also ==
- COVID-19 pandemic by country and territory
- COVID-19 pandemic in Iraq
- COVID-19 pandemic in Asia
