= Tawfiq al-Yasiri =

Iraqi politician and military officer (died 2020)

- توفيق الياسري

Personal details
- Born: Iraq
- Died: 14 June 2020 Al Diwaniyah, Iraq

Military service
- Rank: Brigadier general
- Battles/wars: Gulf War

Tawfiq al-Yasiri (Note: Arabic: توفيق الياسري, romanized: Tawfīq al-Yāsirī) (died 14 June 2020) was an Iraqi military officer and politician who was the founder and secretary-general of the Democratic Patriotic Coalition.

== Biography ==
al-Yasiri was a brigadier general in the events of 1991 in Iraq, and led opponents of Saddam Hussein's regime in the city of Al Diwaniyah. Al-Yasiri then fled to Saudi Arabia, where he stayed for several years in the Rafha camp and from there to London, where he was active among the opposition within the leadership of the Iraqi National Accord Movement led by former Prime Minister Ayad Allawi. He then later separated from it, returned to Baghdad after the occupation of Iraq in 2003, formed a political organization called the Democratic Patriotic Coalition, and worked as a consultant in the first Ministry of the Interior after the fall of the regime.

al-Yasiri died from COVID-19 on 14 June 2020 in Al Diwaniyah, making him the first politician in Iraq to die from the virus during the COVID-19 pandemic in Iraq.
