= Mar Ahudeni Church =

Historic Syriac Orthodox church in Mosul, Iraq

- كنيسة مار أهوديني
- Mar Ahudeni Church
- 36°20′30″N 43°7′45″E
- Location: Old City of Mosul, Nineveh Governorate, Iraq
- Denomination: Syriac Orthodox Church

History
- Status: Active
- Founded: 10th century

The Mar Ahudeni Church, also known as the Mar Hudeni Church, the Church of Mar Ahudemmeh, or the Old Church of the Tikritans, is a historic Syriac Orthodox church located in the Old City of Mosul, Iraq.

Dating to the 10th century, the church served the Tikritan Christian community in Mosul for centuries.

== History ==
=== Origins and dedication ===
The church was built around the 10th or 11th century to serve the Tikritan Christian community that had settled in Mosul. Its establishment followed the dispersal of Christians from Tikrit; in 1089, Arab forces destroyed the church of Mar Ahudemmeh in Tikrit, causing the Christian population to flee, with most relocating to Mosul.

== Architecture ==
The Mar Ahudeni Church is located in the old center of Mosul, near the Saa region.

The structure reflects traditional Syriac Orthodox church architecture typical of the Mosul region. Locally, the church is also known as the "Old Church of the Takritans" due to its association with the Tikritan Christian community.

== See also ==
- Christianity in Iraq
- Syriac Orthodox Church
- List of churches and monasteries in Nineveh
- Ahudemmeh
- Tikrit
