= Saleh Kubba =

Iraqi politician (1911-2005)

Saleh Abdul Amir Kubba (Arabic: صالح عبدالأمير كبة) was an Iraqi politician who served as the governor of Central Bank of Iraq, OPEC, and Minister of Finance of Iraq.

== Early life ==
Saleh Kubba was born in Baghdad on November 5, 1911. The Kubba family originates from the Rabia tribe. Kubba graduated in 1929 from the Central Secondary School, which used to be the only high school in Baghdad back then. He joined the Teachers' Training College, graduated in 1931 and served as a mathematics teacher at secondary schools in Baghdad, Hilla and Najaf.

== Education ==
He attained a government scholarship in 1933 to study in the United States, departing first to Beirut, where he took a one-year English language course. He enrolled in the University of California, Berkeley (UC Berkeley), and graduated with a bachelor's degree in economics. In California, he had a kidney disease that resulted in the removal of one of his kidneys. For the rest of his life, he lived on one kidney.

== Career (1940s-1950s) ==
Kubba returned to Iraq in 1940, embarking on a distinguished career replete with a dedication to his work and to serving the public domain. He was first appointed at the Ministry of Economy, where he established the Statistics Section. Later he was transferred to the Ministry of Finance as assistant director at the Directorate of International Transfers, soon taking over from the British Director to become the first Iraqi Director. This key Directorate was subjoined to the Central Bank of Iraq when it was established in 1947. Saleh Kubba was among the earliest employees at this leading institution.

He became a permanent member of all delegations representing Iraq to meetings and negotiations with the World Bank and the International Monetary Fund (IMF) held in Washington, with the Sterling Pound Bloc held in London, and with the League of Arab Countries in Cairo. The Iraqi government decided in 1958 to embark on negotiations for the withdrawal from the Sterling Bloc. Mr. Kubba had a unique role in the challenging and complicated negotiations that resulted in Iraq's successful withdrawal from the Sterling Bloc. The Iraqi Dinar attained a strong status relative to other currencies.

== Career (1960s) ==
Kubba was appointed Deputy Minister of Petroleum in 1960. He played a crucial role in launching the Organization of Petroleum Producing Countries (OPEC). With his contacts during his experience throughout the 1940s and 1950s, Mr. Kubba was able to assist and formalize OPEC. Being an Iraqi initiative, the Organization was then inaugurated in Baghdad. At first, OPEC comprised Iraq, Saudi Arabia, Kuwait, Iran, and Venezuela only. Mr. Kubba became Iraq's first delegate to OPEC and represented Iraq numerous times between 1960 and 1966. After 1960, he attended OPEC meetings in Switzerland (OPEC HQ between 1961 and 1965) and Vienna (OPEC HQ 1965–present) while representing Iraq. In 1966, Mr. Kubba was OPEC conference president, being the first official conference president from Iraq.

Kubba was appointed Minister of Finance in February 1963

Kubba returned to government service in 1964 as chairman of the board at the Iraq National Oil Company, the first Iraqi company in this field. Despite the salary sacrifice caused by leaving the private sector, he exerted diligent efforts in this position, as was his custom.

Between 1965 and 1969, Mr. Kubba was appointed Governor of the Central Bank. He represented Iraq in meetings with the World Bank and the International Monetary Fund. He was chosen as a member of the fundraising committee for the University of Kufa project. He raised a significant amount of money donated by businessmen and merchants because of their trust in Saleh Kubba.

== Post-1969 ==
Kubba was acquitted from his position in 1969 and was compelled to emigrate from Iraq and settled abroad. He took advisory positions with several private companies. Saleh Kubba was persecuted by the former regime from mid-1969 and sentenced to death in absentia. He had to bear forced exile.

== Death ==
Kubba died on March 10, 2005, two years after witnessing the former Iraqi regime's end, and was interred in the family cemetery in Najaf. The family held traditional condolence receptions in Baghdad. Large numbers of people attended these gatherings.
