= Central Bank of Iraq =

State-owned bank in Iraq

Coordinates: 33.3376°N 44.3941°E

Central Bank of Iraq البنك المركزي العراقي
- Central bank of: Iraq
- Headquarters: (Iraq) Baghdad
- Established: 16 November 1947
- Ownership: 100% state ownership
- Governor: Nizar Nasir
- Currency: Iraqi dinar IQD (ISO 4217)
- Reserves: US$113 billion (2024)
- Reserve requirements: 7.1% (March 2023)
- Bank rate: 3.9% (August 2023)
- Website: cbi.iq

The Central Bank of Iraq (CBI; Arabic: البنك المركزي العراقي) is a monetary authority established in 1947. The CBI's primary objectives are to ensure domestic price stability and foster a stable competitive market based financial system.

== History ==
After World War I and the dissolution of the Ottoman Empire, Iraq's monetary system was administered by the British Mandate of Mesopotamia until 1931, when the Iraq Currency Board was established in London to issue the new Iraqi dinar and maintain its reserves. The Iraq Currency Board pursued a "conservative monetary policy, maintaining very high reserves behind the dinar", which was "further strengthened by its link to the British pound".

In 1947, the National Bank of Iraq (today the Central Bank of Iraq) was established. Two years later, in 1949, the Iraq Currency Board was dissolved and officially replaced by the National Bank of Iraq after the latter began to formally issue the Iraqi currency. Since switching over to its own central bank, the Iraqi monetary system was "replete with mismanagement, coercive stop-gap measures, and the production of an unstable, unreliable currency which ha[d] not been tradeable on the international market for [many] years". Saddam Hussein wielded monetary and the dinar as "a powerful instrument of repression".

Beginning on 18 March 2003 (the day before United States forces entered Baghdad as part of the 2003 invasion of Iraq), nearly US$1 billion was stolen from the Central Bank of Iraq. That month, a handwritten note signed by Saddam Hussein surfaced, ordering $910 million to be withdrawn and given to his son Qusay Hussein. Bank officials state that Qusay and another unidentified man oversaw the cash, boxes of $100 bills secured with stamped seals known as security money, being loaded into trucks and trailers during a five-hour operation. This was considered the largest bank heist in history until 2010. Qusay Hussein was later killed by the U.S. 101st Airborne Division in a battle.

U.S. Department of the Treasury and Coalition Provisional Authority inspectors discovered the bank in ruins after the Battle of Baghdad and mass looting after the invasion. After the fall of Saddam Hussein's government, the Central Bank of Iraq was established as Iraq's independent central bank by the Central Bank of Iraq Law 2004, with authorised capital of 100 billion dinars. According to the law, 100% of the bank's capital stock would be held by the State and would not be transferable.

The Central Bank of Iraq, guarded by U.S. troops in June 2003

The Constitution of Iraq states that the central bank is a financially and administratively independent institution, responsible before the Council of Representatives of Iraq. According to the Constitution, the Iraqi federal government has the "exclusive authority" of "establishing and administering a central bank".

On 25 January 2010, the Supreme Court of Iraq ruled that the Central Bank of Iraq should be under supervision of the Council of Ministers of Iraq. Then Central Bank chief Sinan Al Shabibi warned that the ruling would threaten the institution's requisite independence.

During the Battle of Mosul in June 2013, Islamic State of Iraq and the Levant (ISIL) militants looted the Central Bank's regional branch in Mosul, absconding with over US$4,29 million.

== Governors ==
Governors of the Central Bank of Iraq since its establishment:

- 12/6/1948 to 14/2/1949: Tawfiq al-Suwaidi
- 14/2/1949 to 23/3/1949: Saleh Haidar
- 24/3/1949 to 30/4/1959: Abdulellah Hafedh
- 1/5/1959 to 14/11/1960: Nadhim al-Zahawi
- 15/11/1960 to 31/12/1962: Abdullatif al-Shawaf
- 1/1/1963 to 18/1/1963: Ahmed Abdullbaqy
- 19/1/1963 to 14/8/1963: Abdulhassan Zalzalah
- 15/8/1963 to 28/11/1965: Khairuddin Haseeb
- 29/11/1965 to 20/1/1969: Saleh Kubba
- 17/12/1968 to 20/5/1973: Abdulhassan Zalzalah
- 12/5/1973 to 29/12/1975: Fawzi al-Qaisi
- 27/12/1975 to 13/5/1976: Ahmed Abdullbaqy
- 11/5/1976 to 1/7/1976: Salah al-Din al-Sheikhli
- 1/7/1976 to 29/4/1978: Fakhri Kadouri
- 3/5/1978 to 15/7/1979: Ezz al-Din Mohamed Saleem al-Bahrani
- 16/7/1979 to 10/10/1984: Hassan Tawfiq Al-Najafi
- 10/10/1984 to 23/10/1987: Hikmat Mizban Ibrahim al-Azzawi
- 3/6/1989 to 30/6/1991: Subhi Nadhem Frankool
- 12/12/1991 to 31/5/1994: Tariq Taleb al-Takmachi
- 1/6/1994 to 8/4/2003: Essam Rasheed Howaish
- 4/9/2003 to 17/10/2012: Sinan Al Shabibi
- 17/10/2012 to 9/9/2014: Abdel Basset Turki
- 9/9/2014 to 15/9/2020: Ali Muhsin al-Alaq
- 15/9/2020 to 23/1/2023: Mustafa Ghaleb
- 23/1/2023 to 18/06/2026: Ali Muhsin al-Alaq
- 18/06/2026 to present: Nizar Nasir

== Architecture ==
The bank headquarters were designed by Danish architects Dissing+Weitling and was completed in 1985. It is a cubical building constructed of reinforced concrete clad in marble. It has few exterior openings, and is instead organised around an inner courtyard which cuts through the heart of the structure and rises to a height of 40m. The courtyard is surrounded on all sides by offices separated by an interior glass curtain wall.

In August 2010, architect Zaha Hadid, born in Baghdad, was appointed to design a new headquarters for the Central Bank in Baghdad. Initial talks about the project were held in Istanbul, Turkey, on 14 August 2010, in the presence of the Central Bank Governor Sinan Al Shabibi. On 2 February 2012, Zaha Hadid joined Sinan Al Shabibi at a ceremony in London to sign the agreement between the Central Bank of Iraq and Zaha Hadid Architects for the design stages of the new CBI Headquarters building.

== Objectives ==
As of at least 28 March 2011, the official website of the CBI states "the primary objectives of the Central Bank of Iraq (CBI) are to ensure domestic price stability and to foster a stable competitive market-based financial system. The CBI shall also promote sustainable growth, employment and prosperity in Iraq". The CBI web site further states that the functions of the CBI in addition to the primary objectives mentioned above include:

- To implement the monetary policy and the exchange rate policy for Iraq.
- To hold gold and manage the state reserves of gold.
- To issue and manage the Iraq currency.
- To establish, oversee, and promote a sound and efficient payment system.
- To issue licenses or permits to banks and to regulate and supervise banks as further specified by the Banking Law.
- To carry out any related ancillary tasks or transactions within the framework of Iraqi law.

The objectives of the Central Bank of the Iraq are as follows:

- Maintaining inflation stability
- Implementing monetary policy (including exchange rate policies)
- Managing the state's reserves
- Issuing and managing the Iraqi dinar
- Regulating private banks

As of December 2009, the bank reported total assets valued at over 57 trillion dinars. The bank's head office is located in Baghdad with four branches in Basrah, Mosul, Sulaimaniyah, and Erbil.

As of July 2010, steps and measures have taken place in order to integrate these branches with the headquarters in Baghdad.

Foreign exchange reserves have increased to nearly US$67 billion (as of September 2012) due to a rise in oil revenues, indicating the improved ability since 2003 to deal with the repayment of foreign debt, the currency stabilization, and the coverage of average monthly imports.

== See also ==
- Economy of Iraq
- British currency in the Middle East
- Iraqi dinar
- List of banks in Iraq
- List of central banks
