= Nadhim al-Zahawi =

Governor of the central bank of Iraq 1959-1960

Nadhim al-Zahawi (Arabic: ناظم الزهاوي) was Governor of the Central Bank of Iraq from May 1959 to November 1960. He was also Iraqi Minister of Trade from November 1960 to February 1963.

Al-Zahawi was of Kurdish ethnicity. His grandson is the British politician Nadhim Zahawi.
