= Zohoor Alaa =

Iraqi TV actress (born 1979)

- Born: Zohoor Alaa Jassim; 21 October 1979 (age 45); Baghdad, Iraq
- Occupation: Actress

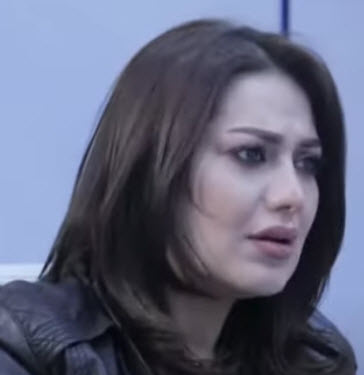
Zohoor Alaa in 2020

Zohoor Alaa (Arabic; زهور علاء) (born 18 March 1979) is an Iraqi TV actress.

== Early life ==
Zohoor Alaa Nooriddeen was born on 21 October 1979 in Baghdad, Iraq. One of her most important serials is Beet Gazal in 2012 which presented Al Sharqiya, and resulted in her fame in Iraq.

== TV serials ==
- Hob wa Jonon 2004
- Al Mario 2007
- Nojjom Lalia 2008
- Beet Gazal 2012
- Madenatna 2016
- Asal Masmoom 2024
