= Nemam Ghafouri =

Kurdish-Swedish physician (1968–2021)

- Born: 25 December 1968; Chnarok region, (present-day Kurdistan Region), Iraq
- Died: 1 April 2021 (aged 52); Stockholm, Sweden
- Education: University of Pécs; Umeå University
- Occupation: Cardiothoracic surgeon
- Known for: Helping Yazidi victims of ISIS

Nemam Ghafouri (25 December 1968 – 1 April 2021) was an Iraqi-born Swedish Kurdish medical doctor and practitioner. She was known for helping Yazidi victims of Islamic State of Iraq and the Levant (ISIL).

== Early life ==
Nemam Ghafouri was born on 25 December 1968 in the Chnarok region of Iraq (now the Kurdistan Region) to Mahmoud Agha Kaka Ziad Ghafouri, a Kurdish resistance commander, and Gulzar Hassan Jalal, who provided resistance fighters with food and ammunition. Ghafouri had 10 siblings and grew up near Tehran and in Naqadeh, in Iran's West Azerbaijan province. When Nemam Ghafouri was 20 years old she moved to Sweden with her parents and seven out of ten siblings. Ghafouri then studied medicine at the University of Pécs, Hungary, and at Umeå University in northern Sweden, earning a medical degree from the latter in 2001. Between 2001 and 2003 she studied public health at Umeå University. Ghafouri later specialized as a cardiothoracic surgeon.

== Career ==
Ghafouri had participated in aid missions in Ethiopia and India. During 2006 and 2007 she performed the first epidemiological investigations into risk factors for cardiovascular disease in Iraqi Kurdistan. She was part of wide-ranging relief efforts, such as missions to Iran to help earthquake survivors. In July 2014 Ghafouri travelled to a refugee camp near Erbil to provide assistance. As a consequence she was one of the first aid workers on site in Iraqi Kurdistan when the ISIL attacked Sinjar. The Sinjar massacre marked the beginning of the exploitation and genocide of Yazidis during the War in Iraq and displaced hundreds of thousands of refugees. Ghafouri helped the refugees arriving wounded and traumatized at the border and made it her primary focus to help them. She also founded Joint Help for Kurdistan, an aid organization assisting yazidi refugees and orphans. Ghafouri set up a clinic at one of the refugee camps; as of April 2021, thousands of displaced Yazidi families still lived in this camp. During this period she would work a few weeks at a time in Sweden or Norway to raise funds and spend most of her time on mission at or near the refugee camp. Ghafouri was an outspoken critic of the Swedish governments stance on actual and would be ISIL-members, accusing the government of inaction.

In March 2021, Ghafouri led a mission assisted by US diplomat Peter Galbraith to reunite twelve children, held in a Kurdish-Syrian orphanage on the Syrian-Iraqi border, with their mothers. The women had given birth to these children while being sexually enslaved by the ISIL fighters. When they returned to Iraq, Yazidi elders had forced them to abandon these children.

== Death ==
Ghafouri contracted COVID-19 in March 2021, while reuniting twelve Yazidi mothers with their children. She was then shifted to Stockholm, Sweden, for urgent medical attention. She died on 1 April 2021.
