= Numan al-Samarrai =

Iraqi scholar and politician (1935–2021)

Secretary-General of the Iraqi Islamic Party
- In office April 1960 – November 1960

Personal details
- Born: 1935 Samarra, Iraq
- Died: 25 November 2021 (aged 85–86) Riyadh, Saudi Arabia
- Party: Iraqi Islamic Party
- Occupation: Muslim scholar

Numan al-Samarrai (Arabic: نعمان السامرائي; 1935 – 25 November 2021) was an Iraqi Sunni Muslim scholar and politician. A member of the Iraqi Islamic Party, he served as its first-ever Secretary-General in 1960 prior to the party's banning.
