= Khairuddin Haseeb =

Iraqi journalist and academic (1929–2021)

- Born: August 1929; Mosul, Mandatory Iraq
- Died: 12 March 2021 (aged 91); Beirut, Lebanon
- Occupations: Journalist; Academic

Khairuddin Haseeb (Arabic: خير الدين حسيب; August 1929 – 12 March 2021) was an Iraqi journalist, academic, and politician. He had served as President of the Centre for Arab Unity Studies since its inception in 1975.

== Biography ==
Haseeb was born in Mosul in August 1929. His father died 15 days after his birth, and he was raised by his grandfather, who was Wajih of the region. His grandfather died when Haseeb finished his secondary studies. He then attended the London School of Economics and earned a doctorate in public finance from the University of Cambridge.

Upon his return to Iraq, Haseeb began working for the Ministry of Oil, helping replace many foreigners who held influence over the Iraq National Oil Company. However, he was imprisoned in 1968, held between four different prisons over the course of four years. He was released in 1972 and became a professor at the University of Baghdad. After his time at the university, he served many active roles in the Arab Organization for Human Rights, The Arab Organization for Translation, and the Arab Organization for Combating Corruption.

Khairuddin Haseeb died in Beirut on 12 March 2021 at the age of 91.
