= Zuhur Dixon =

Iraqi poet (1933–2021)

- زهور دكسن
- Born: 1933; Abu Al-Khaseeb, Iraq
- Died: 22 March 2021 (aged 87–88); Baghdad, Iraq
- Other names: Zuhur Dickson, Zuhur Diksin
- Occupations: Teacher and poet

Zuhur Dixon (Arabic: زهور دكسن) (1933 – 22 March 2021) was an Iraqi poet.

== Biography ==
She was born in 1933 in Abu Al-Khaseeb. Dixon later moved to Baghdad with her husband. Her writing deals with the role of women in a very traditional society.

Her work was included in the anthologies Modern Arabic Poetry: An Anthology and This Same Sky: A Collection of Poems from Around the World.

Dixon died on 22 March 2021, aged 88.

== Works ==
Selected works:

- Cities have another awakening, poetry (1976)
- A Homeland for Everything, poetry (1979)
