= Al-Tahera Church, Mosul =

Al-Tahira Church
- كنيسة الطاهرة القلعة
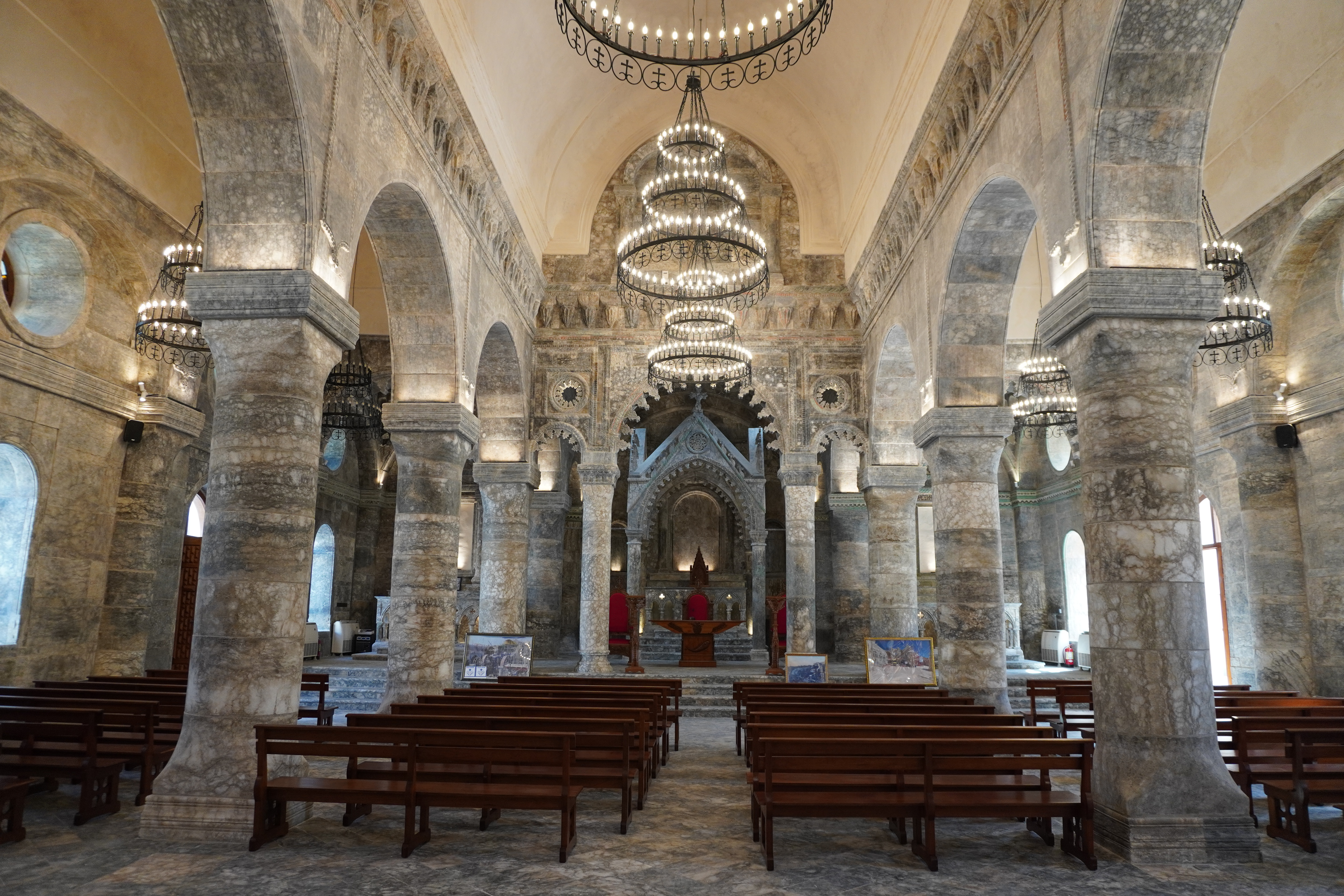
- Al-Tahira Church
- 36.3445°N 43.1326°E
- Location: Mosul
- Country: Iraq
- Denomination: Syriac Catholic Church

History
- Consecrated: 1862

Architecture
- Demolished: February 2015

The Al-Tahera Church (Arabic: كنيسة الطاهرة القلعة) is a partially demolished Syriac Catholic church in Mosul, Iraq.

== History ==
The current building was constructed between 1859 and 1862, replacing an adjacent ancient church. The church was partially destroyed by ISIL during its campaign to destroy cultural heritage during 2014–2017. A reconstruction effort was organized by UNESCO with support of the United Arab Emirates to rebuild the church.
