= List of companies of Iraq =

Location of Iraq

Iraq is a country in Western Asia, bordered by Turkey to the north, Iran to the east, Kuwait to the southeast, Saudi Arabia to the south, Jordan to the southwest, and Syria to the west. Iraq's economy is dominated by the oil sector, which as 2021, provides about 92% of foreign exchange earnings. The lack of development in other sectors has resulted in 13% unemployed as of 2017 per capita GDP of $7,000. Public sector employment accounted for nearly 60% of full-time employment in 2011. The oil export industry, which dominates the Iraqi economy, generates very little employment. Currently only a modest percentage of women (the highest estimate for 2011 was 22%) participate in the labour force.

== Notable firms ==
This list includes notable companies with primary headquarters located in the country. The industry and sector follow the Industry Classification Benchmark taxonomy. Organizations which have ceased operations are included and noted as defunct.

Notable companies Status: P=Private, S=State; A=Active, D=Defunct
Name	Industry	Sector	Headquarters	Founded	Notes	Status	
Agricultural Cooperative Bank of Iraq	Financials	Banks	Baghdad	1935	Oldest bank in Iraq	S	A
Al-Naser Airlines	Civil aviation	Airlines	Karrada	2005	Defunct 2019	P	D
Asiacell	Telecommunications	Mobile telecommunications	Sulaymaniyah	1999		P	A
Azmar Airlines	Civil aviation	Airlines	Sulaymaniyah	2005	Defunct 2015	P	D
Babylon Bank	Financials	Banks	Baghdad	1998		P	A
Baghdad Soft Drinks Co (BSDC)	Consumer goods	Soft drinks	Baghdad	1989	Soft drinks	P	A
Bank of Baghdad	Financials	Banks	Baghdad	1992		P	A
Basrah International Bank for Investment	Financials	Banks	Baghdad	1993		P	A
Central Bank of Iraq	Financials	Banks	Baghdad	1947	Central bank	S	A
Dar Es Salaam Investment Bank	Financials	Banks	Baghdad	1998		P	A
Fly Baghdad	Civil aviation	Airlines	Baghdad	2014	Private airliner	P	A
Gulf Commercial Bank	Financials	Banks	Baghdad	2000		P	A
Hajj Zabala Drinks	Consumer services	Restaurants & bars	Baghdad	1900		P	A
Industrial Bank of Iraq	Financials	Banks	Baghdad	1935	Oldest bank in Iraq	S	A
Iraq National Oil Company	Energy	Exploration & production	Baghdad	1966	Oil & Gas	S	A
Iraq Stock Exchange	Financials	Stock exchange	Baghdad	2004	Formerly Baghdad Stock Exchange	P	A
Iraqi Airways	Civil aviation	Airlines	Baghdad	1946	National carrier	S	A
Iraqi International Law Group	Legal services	Business support services	Baghdad	2003	Law firm, defunct 2008	P	D
Iraqi Islamic Bank	Financials	Banks	Baghdad	1993		P	A
Iraqi Oil Tankers Company	Industrial Transportation	Marine transportation	Basra	1972		S	A
Iraqi Republic Railways	Industrial Transportation	Railroads	Baghdad	1905	National railways	S	A
Iraqi Telecommunications and Post Company	Telecommunications	Fixed line telecommunications	Baghdad	1919		S	A
Korek Telecom	Telecommunications	Mobile telecommunications	Erbil	2000		P	A
Midland Oil Company	Energy	Oil & Gas	Baghdad	2010	Exploration & production	S	A
Missan Oil Company	Energy	Oil & Gas	Amarah	2008	Exploration & production	S	A
Mobitel (Iraq-Kurdistan)	Telecommunications	Mobile telecommunications	Erbil	2007		P	A
North Oil Company	Energy	Oil & Gas	Kirkuk	1928	Exploration & production	S	A
Qi Card	Financial services	Credit cards & payment systems	Baghdad	2007	Semi-public corporation	P	A
Rafidain Bank	Financials	Banks	Baghdad	1941	Largest bank in Iraq	S	A
Rasheed Bank	Financials	Banks	Baghdad	1988	Second largest bank in Iraq	S	A
Real Estate Bank of Iraq	Financials	Banks	Baghdad	1948		S	A
Rumaila Operating Organization	Energy	Oil & Gas	Basra	2010	Exploration & production	S	A
State Organization for Marketing of Oil	Industrials	Business support services	Baghdad	1972	Oil marketing	S	A
South Oil Company	Energy	Oil & Gas	Basra	1970	Exploration & production	S	A
Trade Bank of Iraq	Financials	Banks	Baghdad	2003		S	A
Ur Airlines	Civil aviation	Airlines	Baghdad	2019	Private airliner	P	A
Warka Bank	Financials	Banks	Baghdad	1999		P	A

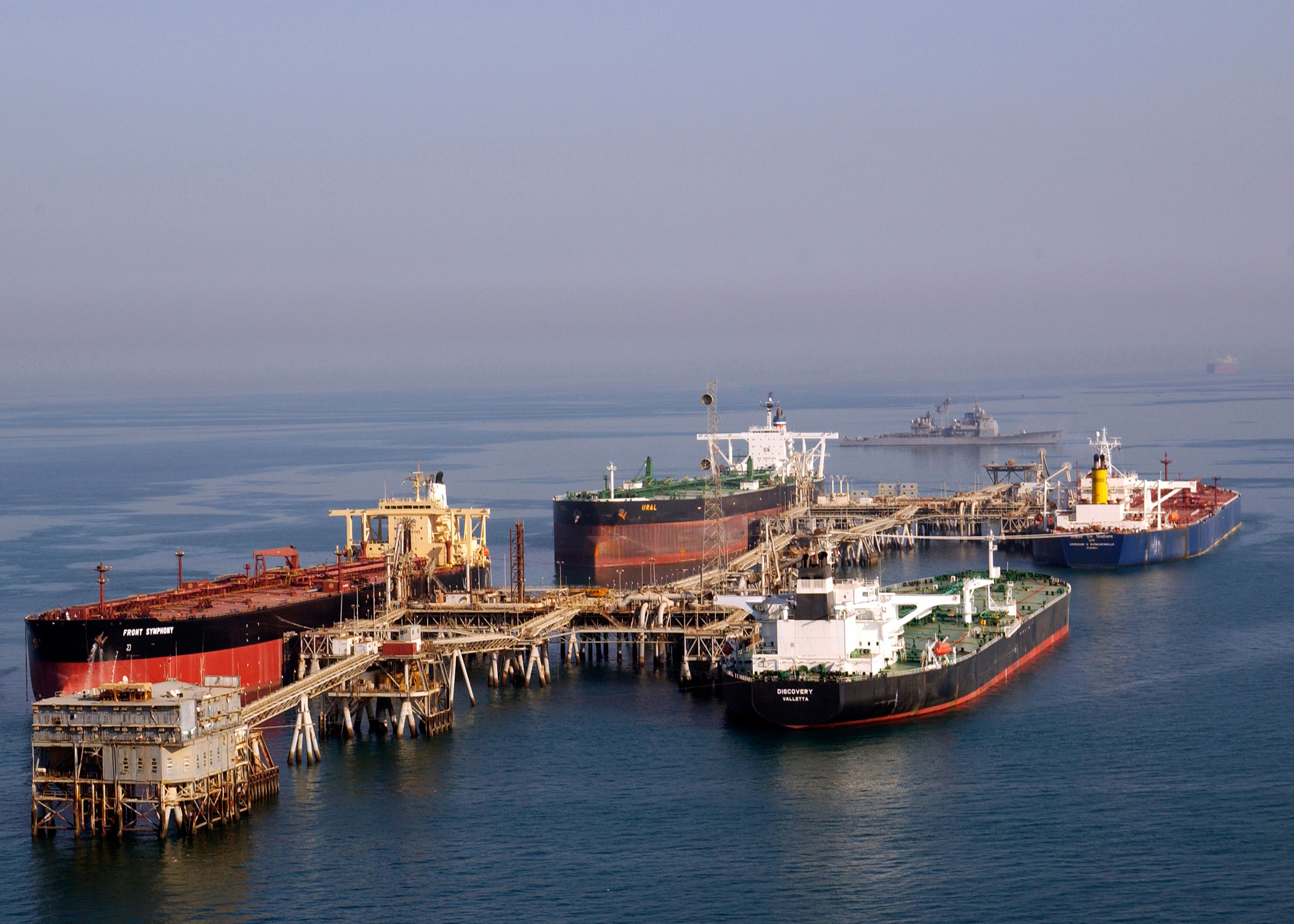
Tankers at the Basra Oil Terminal.

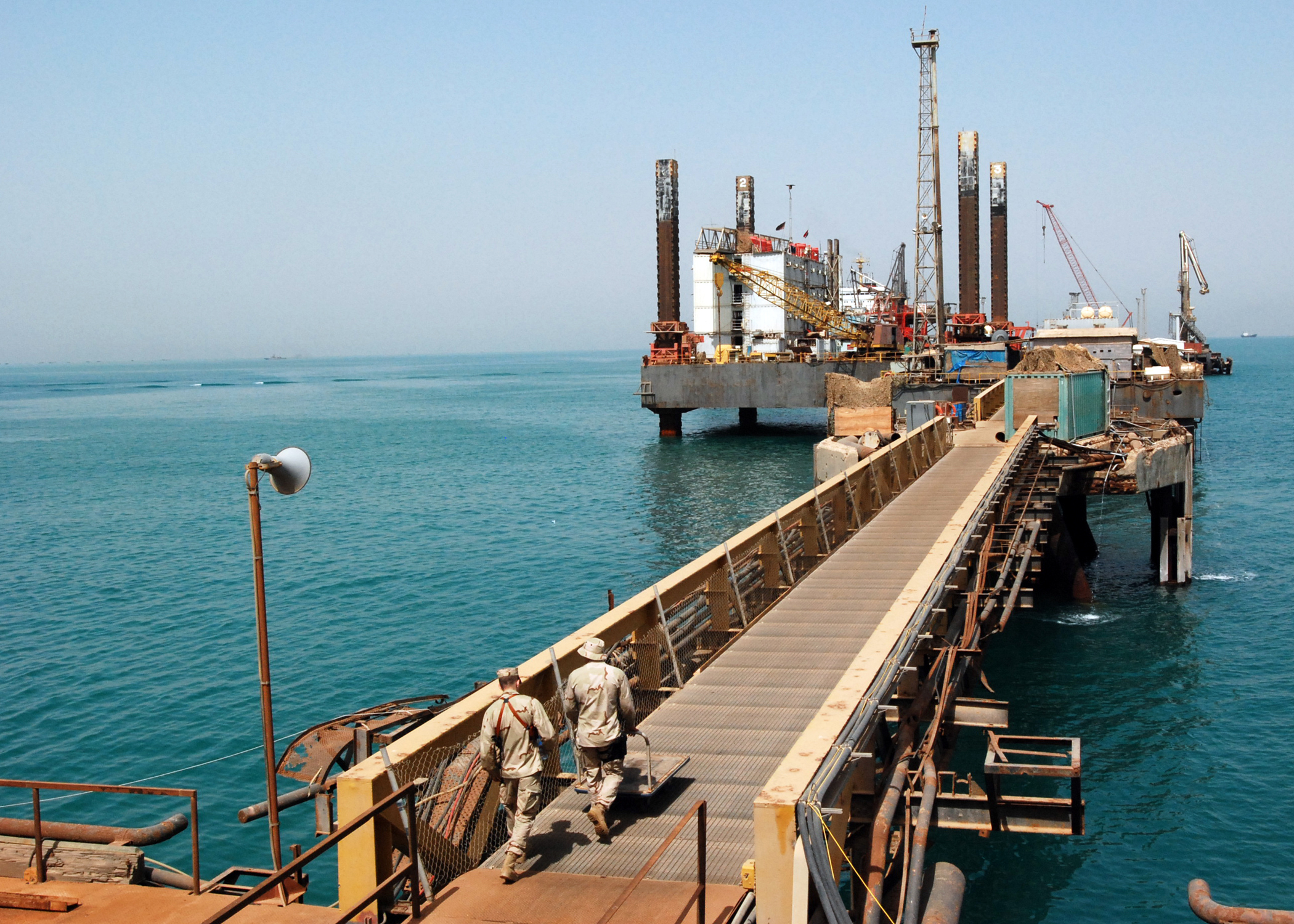
An oil platform of Iraq in Basra, Persian Gulf.

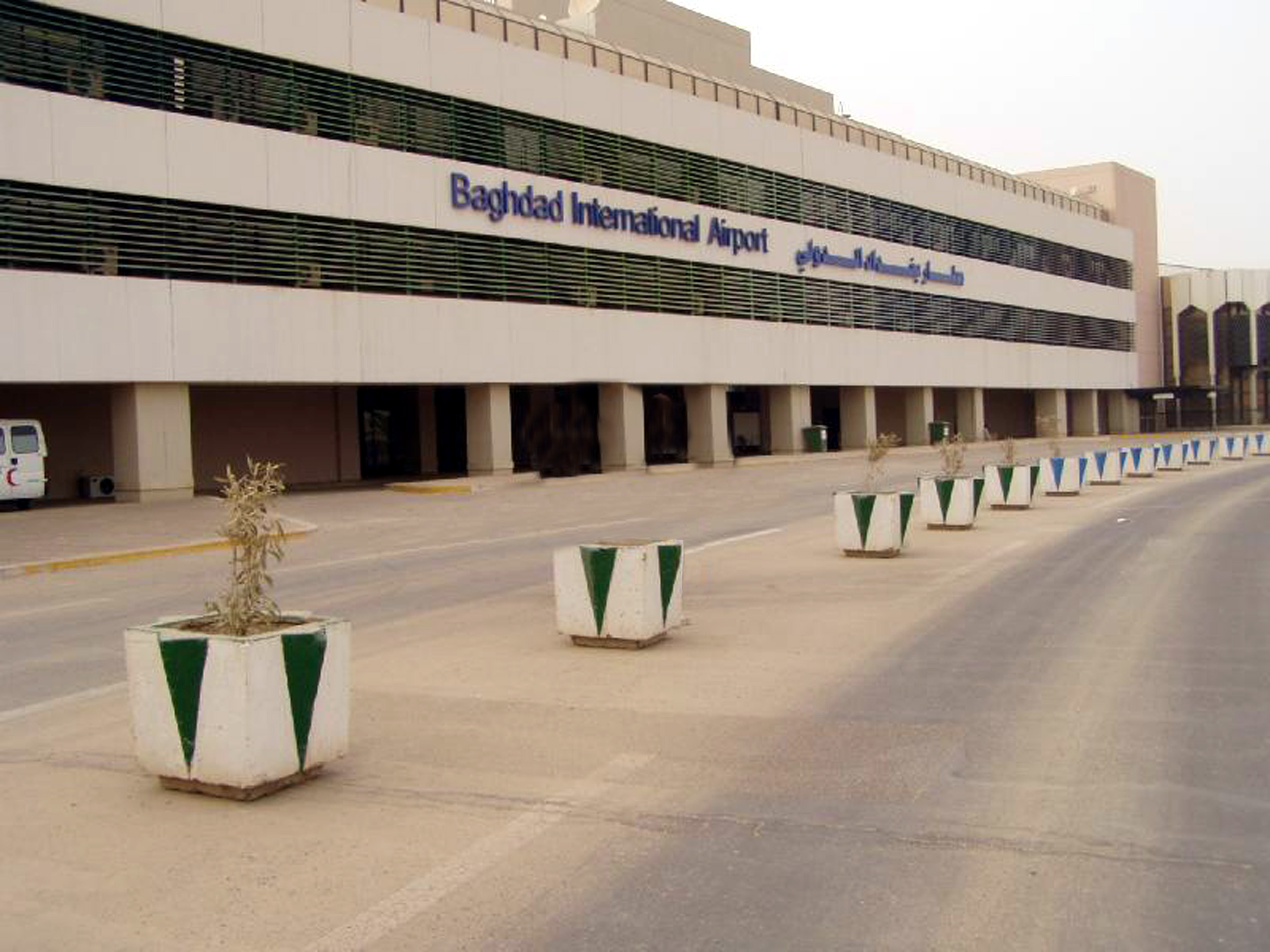
Baghdad International Airport.

== See also ==
- Economy of Iraq
- List of airlines of Iraq
- List of banks in Iraq
