= Banking in Iraq =

Modern-style banking in Iraq roots from the beginning of the 20th century.

Iraq's two main state-owned banks are the largest banks in Iraq and have a shared history. In 1988, Rasheed Bank was spun off from Rafidain Bank.

Banking group	Established	Number of Branches	Total Assets (Iraqi Dinar billion)	Share of total banking system assets	Share of total banking system credit	Share of total banking system deposits
Rasheed Bank	1988	162				
Rafidain Bank	1941	147				

== Specialist state owned banks ==
It also has four specialist state-owned banks.

Bank	Established	Purpose
Agricultural Cooperative Bank of Iraq	1935	Provide credit and banking services to Iraq's agricultural sector
Bank of Iraq	1991	Founded as the Iraqi Socialist Bank
Industrial Bank of Iraq	1946	Financing and supporting Iraq’s industrial sector
Real Estate Bank of Iraq	1948	Financing and supporting Iraq's housing projects

== Private Commercial Banks ==
Iraq has many private banks that are operate across the Governorates of Iraq. These include:

Bank	Established	Number of Branches
Babylon Bank	1998	12
Bank of Baghdad	1992	
Basrah International Bank for Investment	1993	12
Dar Es Salaam Investment Bank	1998	
Gulf Commercial Bank	2000	12
Iraqi Islamic Bank	2000	14
Islamic Cooperation Investment Bank	2006	10
Warka Bank	1999	120

== Supervision and regulation ==
The Central Bank of Iraq supervises Iraqi banks.
