= List of banks in Iraq =

This is a list of banks in Iraq.

== Central bank ==
- National Bank of Iraq: Central Bank of Iraq

== State-owned banks ==
- Agricultural Cooperative Bank of Iraq
- Bank of Iraq
- Industrial Bank of Iraq
- Rafidain Bank
- Rasheed Bank
- Real Estate Bank of Iraq
- Trade Bank of Iraq

== Private banks ==
- Al Janoob Islamic Bank
- Al Qurtas Islamic Bank for Investment and Finance (QIB)
- Albaraka Türk
- Arab Bank Iraq
- Ashur International Bank for Investment
- Babylon Bank
- Bank Audi
- Bank of Baghdad
- Bānk-e Mellī-e Īrān (the national bank of Iran)
- Basrah International Bank for Investment
- Byblos Bank (Lebanese)
- Commercial Bank of Iraq
- Credit Bank of Iraq
- Dar Es Salaam Investment Bank
- Dijlah & Furat Bank
- Economy Bank Iraq
- ِElaf Islamic Bank
- ALTAIF ISLAMIC BANK
- FIRST IRAQI BANK
- Ghana Bank
- Gulf Commercial Bank
- Industrial Union Investment Bank
- International Development Bank of Iraq (IDB)
- Investment Bank of Iraq
- Iraqi Middle East Investment Bank
- Islamic Bank
- Kurdistan International Bank
- Mosul Bank
- North Bank
- Region Trade Bank for Investment and Finance (RTB)
- Sumer Bank
- T.C. Ziraat Bankasi of Turkey (the Turkish state agricultural bank)
- Taawen Islamic Bank
- Union Bank of Iraq
- United Investment Bank
- ِWorld Islamic Bank

== International banks ==
Standard Chartered Bank

== See also ==
List of banks in the Arab world
