= Bank of Iraq =

State-owned bank of Iraq

- Native name: مصرف العراق
- Formerly: Socialist Bank of Iraq
- Type: State-owned
- Industry: Banking
- Founded: 1991; 35 years ago
- Defunct: 2012
- Fate: Merged with Rafidain Bank
- Headquarters: Baghdad, Iraq
- Products: Financial Services

Bank of Iraq (Arabic: مصرف العراق), formerly known as Socialist Bank of Iraq (Arabic: مصرف الاشتراكي), was an Iraqi state-owned commercial bank headquartered in Baghdad. Established in 1991, the bank operated under the administrative supervision of the Iraqi Ministry of Finance and was regulated by the Central Bank of Iraq. It was the smallest Iraqi state-owned banks by assets, with total assets valued at IQD 1 billion (then US$670,000) in 2003. It also used to operate four branches, and had about 234 employees at that time. The bank primarily provided retail and commercial banking services for financially disadvantaged citizens.

== History ==
During the rule of Saddam Hussein, the Bank of Iraq was established as the Socialist Bank of Iraq on 17 June 1991 under Revolutionary Command Council Decision No. 183 of 1991. The decision established the bank with a capital of IQD 500 million and placed it under the supervision of the Ministry of Finance. The bank was primarily established to provide interest-free loans to low income citizens, including public servants, persons with disabilities, and veterans of the Iran–Iraq War who had received more than three military medals, to help meet social and living expenses.

The Socialist Bank of Iraq was also used to provide special loans to individuals at the direction of the Iraqi government. These loans, reportedly funded by Saddam Hussein or the Central Bank, could exceed IQD 5 million per recipient. By comparison, ordinary loans issued to the bank's customers generally ranged from IQD 500 to IQD 5,000.

Following the Iraqi invasion of Kuwait in 1990, the bank operated amid the severe economic disruption caused by the subsequent international sanctions against Iraq, which constrained the country's economy and financial system. On 6 October 1996, Iraq's specialised banks were permitted to conduct commercial banking activities in addition to their statutory functions. The Socialist Bank of Iraq subsequently expanded beyond its original role of providing financing to economically vulnerable citizens and began offering general banking services.

After the 2003 invasion of Iraq, the Coalition Provisional Authority issued Order 76 in 2004, which initially provided for the bank to be merged into Rasheed Bank. The decision was reversed the following year. The Socialist Bank of Iraq was subsequently renamed the Bank of Iraq, and was eventually absorbed into Rafidain Bank on 7 May 2012, pursuant to Law No. 34 of 2012, which had been issued on 22 April 2012.

== See also ==
- List of banks in Iraq
