= Burgan Bank =

Kuwaiti bank

- Native name: بنك برقان
- Type: Public
- Traded as: KSE:BURG
- ISIN: KW0EQ0100077
- Founded: 27 December 1975; 50 years ago
- Headquarters: Kuwait City, Kuwait
- Key people: Sheikh Abdullah Nasser Al-Sabah (Chairman); Antoine Jean Daher (Group CEO); Fadel Mahmoud Abdullah (CEO)
- Revenue: ▲KWD 543.46 million (2023)
- Net income: ▲KWD 34.49 million (2023)

Burgan Bank is a Kuwaiti bank headquartered in Kuwait City. It is Kuwait's second-largest conventional bank by assets. A subsidiary of Kuwait Projects Company Holding, it operates a network of 24 branches and over 100 ATMs. In 2007, Burgan Bank recorded a profit of 74.8 million Kuwaiti dinars, up 34% since the previous year, where they had a profit of 55.7 million Kuwaiti dinar.

== History ==
In 2009, Burgan Bank acquired United Gulf Bank's stake in Bank of Baghdad, increasing its share to 51.8%.

On 23 December 2012, Burgan Bank acquired, from Eurobank, a 70% stake in Tekfenbank, which is a Turkish bank in Cyprus. The deal was reached amid increasing interest by banks in Persian Gulf nations to expand operations in Turkey.

In early 2023, Jordan Kuwait Bank acquired Burgan Bank stake in Bank of Baghdad.

In November 2023, Burgan Bank agreed to sell a 52% stake in its Turkish subsidiary, Burgan Bank Turkey, to Al Rawabi United Holding, a company owned by KIPCO. Burgan Bank was to keep operating control of the Turkish bank and continue to consolidate it in its financial statements.

In December 2023, Burgan Bank obtained the approval of the Central Bank of Kuwait and appointed Fadel Mahmoud Abdullah as the new CEO.

In the first quarter of 2025, Burgan Bank completed the acquisition of United Gulf Bank of Bahrain from United Gulf Holding Company for US$190 million. United Gulf Bank holds a 60% stake in Kamco Investment Company.

In September 2026, Burgan Bank completed a rights issue that raised KWD 50 million (US$161.7 million) and was oversubscribed 1.34 times.
