= Alrabiaa Network Television =

Iraqi satellite TV Channel

Alrabiaa Television Network مؤسسة الرابعة للإعلام قناة الرابعة الفضائية
- Country: Iraq
- Broadcast area: Worldwide, via satellite and internet
- Headquarters: Baghdad

Programming
- Language: Arabic
- Picture format: 1080i HDTV

Ownership
- Owner: Qi Card
- Key people: Ghazwan Jassem (General Manager) غزوان جاسم / Taha Abo Ragheef (Ceo of Alrabiaa Sports TV) طه ابو رغيف

History
- Launched: 2021

Links
- Website: www.alrabiaa.tv

Availability

Streaming media
- Live stream: alrabiaa.tv/live/alrabiaa_live

Alrabiaa Television Network (Arabic: مؤسسة الرابعة للإعلام) or Alrabiaa TV (Arabic: قناة الرابعة الفضائية), is an Iraqi satellite television network based in Baghdad, Iraq. The channel was launched in 2021 by Qi Card and Ghazwan Jassem.

== Programs ==
- Sout Almalaeb - صوت الملاعب (in Arabic)
- Studio Alateba - ستديو الاطباء (in Arabic)
- Halqa Waswl - حلقة وصل (in Arabic)
- Shako Mako- شكو ماكو (in Arabic)
- Sabah Alrabiaa - صباح الرابعة (in Arabic)

Alrabiaa Network Television acquired the rights to broadcast the matches of the AFC Championships exclusively in all its competitions until 2024, with an estimated amount of 12 million US dollars.

== Name of the TV channel ==
This name represents the fourth authority, and it is a term generally applied to the press and the mass media to highlight their influential role not only in circulating news and knowledge, but also in forming opinion, disclosing information, creating issues and representing the people.

In September 2022, the Network launched more than 16 satellite channels, the most prominent of which are Alrabiaa Movies TV and Alrabiaa Quran TV.

== Cooperation ==
- A contract was signed with beIN Media Group for two years, amounting to more than $32 million . Through this agreement, the Alrabiaa TV Channels are allowed to broadcast all the tournaments owned by the beIN Media Group inside Iraq exclusively.
- Nojoom Alrabiaa Network in Arabic شبكة نجوم الرابعة (Part of Alrabiaa TV Channels) A sponsorship contract was signed with Diyala SC for two years. Through this agreement, it will be the official sponsor of Diyala SC starting next season and for two seasons.
