= Fawzi Abdullah al-Qaisi =

- Born: 1926
- Died: 1979 (aged 52–53)
- Occupation(s): Economist and academic
- Known for: Governor of the Central Bank of Iraq

Fawzi Abdullah al-Qaisi was an Iraqi economist and academic, born in 1926 and died in 1979.

== Life ==
He spent his childhood in the Bani Said locality in Baghdad. He received his doctorate in the year 1958.

He was an economist specializing in the Keynzian Monterrey Theory. He was also a Dean of the Faculty of Management and Economics at the University of Baghdad, then a general manager of the Rafidain Bank for the period 1968–1970, after that a manager of the Arab French Bank, then governor of the Central Bank of Iraq for the period from 12 May 1973 to 29 December 1975 and finally Minister of Finance, succeeding Saadi Ibrahim, who died on October 8, 1975, and remained in office until his death in 1979.

He was always smoking, he burned his throat with a cigarette and died because of it. When he died in 1979, "his funeral took place in a spectacular scene that no civilian minister did enjoy at the time."

== Literature ==
- Critical Theory, 1964
- Budget of the Republic of Iraq for 1978
