= Rafidayn =

Rafidayn (Arabic: رافدين, lit. 'two tributaries') may refer to:

- Bilad al-Rafidayn, an Arabic term for Mesopotamia
- Rafidain Bank, the largest bank in Iraq
- Tanzim Qa'idat al-Jihad fi Bilad al-Rafidayn, the name for Al-Qaeda in Iraq
