= Iraq Securities Commission =

Independent Iraqi public commission

Coordinates: 33°19′27″N 44°21′29″E

Republic of Iraq Iraqi Securities Commission
- هيئــة الأوراق الماليــة العراقيــة
- Emblem of Iraq

Agency overview
- Headquarters: ِAl Mansour, Baghdad, Iraq
- Agency executive: Abdul Razzaq Al-Saadi, Chairman
- Website: http://www.isc.gov.iq/

The Iraq Securities Commission (ISC) is an independent public commission that oversees the activities of licensed securities markets, one of which is the Iraq Stock Exchange.

== See also ==
- List of financial supervisory authorities by country
