= Warka Bank =

Bank of Iraq

Warka Bank for Investment & Finance (JSC)
- Native name: مصرف الوركاء للاستثمار والتمويل (شركة مساهمة خاصة)
- Type: Private
- Industry: Banking
- Founded: 20 October 1999; 27 years ago
- Headquarters: Baghdad, Iraq
- Key people: Saad Saadoun Mahmoud, Chairman of the Board
- Products: Financial Services
- Operating income: IQD 2.8 billion (2025)
- Total assets: IQD 404 billion (2025)
- Website: www.warka-bank.com

Warka Bank for Investment & Finance (JSC) (Arabic: مصرف الوركاء للاستثمار والتمويل) is a private Iraqi commercial bank, with headquarters in Baghdad. Established in 1999, the bank had over 150 branches across the country at its peak. Currently, it only has two other branches in Basra and Duhok. The bank primarily focuses on retail and commercial banking services.

== History ==
Warka Bank was established on 20 October 1999, with a capital of IQD 500 million. The bank obtained its banking licence from the Central Bank of Iraq on 12 January 2000, and subsequently commenced its operations on 28 February 2000. In 2007, Warka Bank opened an overseas branch in Beirut, Lebanon, but it was later closed down on 13 March 2022 due to the deteriorating economic conditions in Lebanon.

By the early 2010s, Warka Bank was experiencing significant financial and liquidity difficulties. In 2011, the bank entered discussions with Standard Chartered and Alfa-Bank over the possible acquisition of a stake in the institution. Following failed negotiations with the international banks, it was delisted from the Iraq Stock Exchange. In March 2012, the Central Bank of Iraq placed the bank under guardianship as part of efforts to supervise it through its financial difficulties. The guardianship was subsequently lifted on 15 August 2013 following a ruling by the Iraqi Financial Services Court.

In May 2025, Warka Bank began repaying funds owed to depositors in instalments under the supervision of the Central Bank, with approximately 3–4% of each depositor's balance being released per instalment. Payments had to be collected in person, prompting dissatisfaction among some depositors whose funds had remained inaccessible since the bank was placed under guardianship.

== Investment ==
Warka bank holds shares in 14 companies, with a total investment portfolio valued at approximately IQD 4.25 billion. Its principal holdings include:

- Al-Hames Limited Company for Vehicle Registration Services
  Established in 2005, with the bank holding a 60% controlling stake. The company has a capital of IQD 100 million.
- Al-Hames Limited Real Estate Investments Company
  90% owned by the bank, with a capital of IQD 150 million. The company owns 12 properties valued at approximately IQD 150 million.
- Warka Brokerage Company for the Sale and Purchase of Securities
  Established in 2008 and 98% owned by the bank. The company has a capital of IQD 1 billion.

== See also ==
- List of banks in Iraq
