= Dar Es Salaam Investment Bank =

Bank of Iraq

- Company type: Private bank
- Industry: Finance and Insurance
- Headquarters: Baghdad, Iraq
- Products: Financial services
- Website: www.desiraq.com

The Dar Es Salaam Investment Bank (ISX: BDSI) is one of the largest commercial banks in Iraq. It was established in 1998.

Other Iraqi banks include: Bank of Baghdad (BNKB), Economy Bank for Investment (BEFI) and Commercial Bank of Iraq (CBIQ).

Other major stocks on the Iraq Stock Exchange include Baghdad Soft Drinks Co, Iraqi Tufted Carpets Co, Hader Marble and Altherar Agriculture.

== See also ==
- Economy of Iraq
- Central Bank of Iraq
