= Kulwatha =

Historical city

Kulwatha كلواذا
- Ancient city
- Interactive map of Kulwatha
- Location of Kulwatha in Iraq Kulwatha (Middle East)
- Coordinates: 33.2833°N 44.3667°E
- Country: Iraq
- Governorate: Baghdad Governorate
- City: Baghdad
- District: Karrada
- Founded: Neo-Babylonian period
- Founder: Nebuchadnezzar II
- Time zone: UTC+3 (Arabian Standard Time)
- Area code: +964

Kulwatha (Arabic: كلواذا) also called Kulwathi is an ancient city mentioned in the writings of Greek, Arab and Syrian historians. The medieval city of Baghdad was built opposite of this city. It was located on the east bank of the Tigris River. In ancient times there was a gate named Kulawatha gate. Today this city is part of al-Rusafa and called Karrada.

The city was built in the Neo-Babylonian period. The archaeological evidence indicates that it was built in the time of Nebuchadnezzar II (605-562 BC). The most prominent historians who wrote about this city are Diodorus Siculus, Yaqut al-Hamawi, Al-Masudi, Said al-Andalusi and Bar Hebraeus.
