= Abdul Karim al-Azri =

Iraqi politician (1908-2008)

- عبد الكريم الأزري

Minister of Finance
- In office December 1957 – May 1958
- Monarch: Faisal II
- Preceded by: Nadim al-Pachachi
- Succeeded by: Nadim al-Pachachi
- In office September 1953 – February 1954
- Monarch: Faisal II
- Preceded by: Ali Mumtaz al-Daftary
- Succeeded by: Ali Mumtaz al-Daftary
- In office February 1950 – September 1950
- Monarch: Faisal II
- Regent: Prince Abdullah
- Preceded by: Ali Mumtaz al-Daftary
- Succeeded by: Abd al-Wahhab Mirjan

Personal details
- Born: Abdul Karim Abdul Hussein Yousif al-Azri; 1908 Kadhimiya, Baghdad, Ottoman Iraq
- Died: 2008 (aged 100) London, United Kingdom
- Education: University of London

Abdul Karim Abdul Hussein Yousif al-Azri (Note: Arabic: عبد الكريم عبد الحسين يوسف الأزري, romanized: ʻAbd al-Karīm ʻAbd al-Ḥusayn Yūsuf al-Azrī) (1908 – 2008) was an Iraqi politician.

== Biography ==
Abdul Karim Abdul Hussein Yousif al-Azri was born in 1908, in the neighborhood of Kadhimiya of Baghdad, Ottoman Iraq.

He studied economics and political science at the University of London.

He held various positions in the Kingdom of Iraq. He was consul for Iraq in 1930 in Kermanshah, Foreign Minister and Minister of Reconstruction several times, in addition to his work in the Teachers' House and Secretary of the Minister of Education and then aide to the President of the Royal Court, in the monarchy of Iraq.

He was Minister of Finance from February 1950 to September 1950, from September 1953 to February 1954, and from December 1957 to May 1958.

al-Azri is the son of Iraqi writer and journalist Abdul Hussein al-Azri and brother of the minister Abdul Amir al-Azri.

His book, A History of Memories of Iraq 1930–1958, was published in 1982.

al-Azri died in 2008 in London, United Kingdom, at the age of 100.
