= Real Estate Bank of Iraq =

State-owned bank of Iraq

- Native name: المصرف العقاري العراقي
- Type: State-owned
- Industry: Banking
- Founded: 1948; 78 years ago
- Headquarters: Baghdad, Iraq
- Key people: Abbas Shihab Al-Jawahiri (Director-general)
- Products: Financial Services
- Total assets: IQD 8.4 trillion (2025)
- Website: reb.gov.iq

Real Estate Bank of Iraq (REB) (Arabic: المصرف العقاري العراقي) is an Iraqi state-owned commercial bank headquartered in Baghdad. Established in 1948, the bank operates under the administrative supervision of the Iraqi Ministry of Finance and is regulated by the Central Bank of Iraq. As of 2025, it is the fourth largest of Iraq’s seven state-owned banks by assets, with total assets valued at IQD 8.4 trillion. It also operates a nationwide network of 16 branches, excluding the Kurdistan Region. The bank primarily provides retail and commercial banking services, with particular emphasis on financing real estate and renewable energy projects across Iraq.

== History ==
=== Establishment ===
Following the end of World War II, Iraq experienced a severe housing shortage accompanied by rising property prices and rents, and an increased demand for mortgage credits. The shortage of available credit was also partly attributed to the withdrawal of Jewish financiers from Iraq's lending market between 1947 and 1948. In response, the Iraqi government established the Real Estate Bank of Iraq, also referred to as the Mortgage Bank, under legislation enacted on 16 November 1948, with an initial capital of IQD 1 million. The bank was established to finance housing development and provide mortgage credit to home buyers as part of government efforts to alleviate the housing shortage. It subsequently began operations in the early 1950s.

=== Since 1950s ===
The Cooperative Credit Bank, which provided financing to housing cooperatives, was established in 1956. It was abolished in 1970, with its resources, obligations and manpower transferred to the REB. In 1974, the REB shifted its lending policy towards financing the purchase of completed homes, rather than primarily financing residential construction.

After the enactment of the Real Estate Bank Law No. 161 of 1976, the bank's capital was increased to IQD 100 million, which was provided by the government. By this period, the REB operated approximately 21 branches and employed 833 people. On 28 June 1976, responsibility for the bank was transferred from the Ministry of Finance to the Ministry of Works and Housing, reflecting the increasing association of its activities with housing and urban development.

Following the Iraqi invasion of Kuwait in 1990, the REB operated amid the severe economic disruption caused by the subsequent international sanctions against Iraq, which constrained the country's economy and financial system. On 6 October 1996, Iraq's specialised banks were permitted to conduct commercial banking activities in addition to their statutory functions. The REB subsequently expanded beyond real estate financing into general banking services.

=== Today ===
During the mid 2010s, the bank's lending activities was halted due to the Islamic State invasion of Iraq and the simultaneous fall in oil prices. The Central Bank subsequently introduced a IQD 5 trillion financing initiative to support major projects and the provision of housing, under which funds were channelled through specialised banks, including the REB. Between 2016 and 2021, the REB provided approximately IQD 2 trillion in housing loans to citizens under the initiative, at a concessional interest rate of 3% and a repayment period of ten years. During this period, its real estate lending was entirely financed through funds received under the Central Bank initiative rather than from the bank's own portfolio.

In 2025, the Iraqi government appointed Ernst & Young to oversee the restructuring of six of the country's seven state-owned banks, including the REB. The following year, the Iraqi Ministry of Finance proposed merging the REB with the Agricultural Cooperative Bank of Iraq and the Industrial Bank of Iraq as part of broader restructuring of the three banks' assets, liabilities, and workforce, with the aim of bringing their operations into line with international banking standards.

== See also ==
- List of banks in Iraq

== Official website ==
- Official website
