= Abdel Mohsen Shalash =

Iraqi politician

Hajj Abdel Mohsen Aboud Saeed Hajim Shalash (December 22, 1882 – 1948) was an Iraqi politician who was born in Najaf and held various positions during the monarchy in Iraq. During the monarchy, he established a tramway between Kufa and Najaf in collaboration with Jawad Kalidar.

== His positions ==
The ministerial positions he held were:

Abdel Mohsen Shalash was appointed Minister of Education in the third union ministry, but the man apologized for accepting the position for the large number of his business, and this position remained vacant until the ministry resigned.

Minister of Finance in the First Jaafar Ministry of Military for the period from 22 November 1923 to 2 August 1924.

Minister of Works and Transportation in the Third Ministry of Abdul Mohsen Al-Saadoun and then the First Ministry of Tawfiq Al-Suwaidi for the period from 14 January 1928 to 19 September 1929.

Minister of Economy in the seventh ministry of Nuri Said for the period from October 8, 1942, to December 19, 1943.
