= Abdul Wahab Mahmoud =

Iraqi politician (1909-1972)

- عبد الوهاب محمود

Personal details
- Born: 1909 Basra, Ottoman Iraq
- Died: 14 January 1972 (aged 62–63)
- Party: Liberal Party (1946–1948)

Abdul Wahab Mahmoud (Note: Arabic: عبد الوهاب محمود, romanized: ʻAbd al-Wahhāb Maḥmūd) (1909 – 14 January 1972) was an Iraqi politician. He was left-leaning and had Marxist tendencies.

== Early life and education ==
Abdul Wahab Mahmoud was born in 1909 in Basra. He was educated in Basra and Baghdad, and graduated from the Faculty of Law in 1932.

== Career ==
Mahmoud was elected as a member of the House of Representatives for the eighth round of elections from 23 December 1937 to 22 February 1939. On 20 December 1938, he was arrested and placed under house arrest in the district of Tal Afar in the Mosul district for two years on charges fomenting clans in Diwaniya. He was released after Jameel Al-Madfaai was removed.

Mahmoud was also a member of the House of Representatives in the ninth session (12 June 1939 - 9 June 1943) and a member of the House of Representatives for the tenth electoral cycle (9 October 1943-21 May 1946).

He was Minister of Finance in the Second Ministry of Tawfiq al-Suwaidi in 1946. He was also a member of the Iraqi Council of Representatives, a bar president, and an ambassador to Iraq in Moscow.

He was a member of the Liberal Party led by Tawfiq al-Suwaidi, founded in 1946, where Saad Saleh Jario was vice-president. His membership continued from 1946 until 1948 when the party ended its activities.

In 1950, Mahmoud signed the Stockholm Appeal for Peace.

He was elected President of the Bar and he was the tenth among the sequence of the Bar presidents during the 1950-1951 session and was re-elected for the 1951-1952 session and for another third session 1952-1953. During his tenure, the Bar Association flourished, lawyers' rooms expanded and lawyers have become similar rooms in the courthouse in some Iraqi cities. In 1958, he was again elected President of the Bar.

He was instrumental in the disturbances of 1952 (the 1952 uprising), and as a result he was held for six weeks. He was also active during the elections in June 1954 but withdrew from politics. After the formation of the government of Nouri al-Said he directed his concerns towards building himself financially.

In 1959 he was appointed Iraqi ambassador to Moscow and remained until 1962.

He was elected President of the Bar for the last time from 1968 to 1971.

== Personal life ==
Mahmoud married Ms. Raqia, a Turk who had mastered the French language and taught it at a school in Baghdad. His only daughter, Buran, was married to Osama bin Tahseen Qadri, a companion to King Faisal I.
