= Abdul Rahman al-Habib =

Former Iraqi minister

Abdul Rahman Abdullah al-Habib al-Rawi is an Iraqi economist and politician, born in the city of Anah in 1920.

He worked as a teacher in the academic year 1945–1946, and then received his doctorate in economics in 1956. He was Undersecretary of the Ministry of Finance and then Minister of Finance in 1967 and 1968.

== Publications ==
- Cooperation of the Arab Countries in the Field of for Developing Economic Relations with the Gulf States and Emirates, 1972
- International Monetary System and Foreign Trade of the Arab Countries, 1985
