= Muhammed Ali Mahmud =

Iraqi politician

- محمد علي محمود

Minister of Finance
- In office June 1937 – August 1937
- Prime Minister: Hikmat Sulayman
- Preceded by: Ja'far Abu al-Timman
- Succeeded by: Ibrahim Kemal

Minister of Works and Transport
- In office 1940–1941
- Prime Minister: Rashid Ali al-Gaylani

Minister of Development
- In office 1953–1954
- Prime Minister: Muhammad Fadhel al-Jamali

Minister of Justice
- Prime Minister: Nuri al-Said

Personal details
- Born: 1892 Erbil, Ottoman Iraq
- Died: 1970 (aged 77–78) Beirut, Lebanon

Muhammed Ali Mahmud (Note: Arabic: محمد علي محمود, romanized: Muḥammad ʿAlī Maḥmūd) (1892 – 1970) was an Iraqi politician who held various ministerial positions during the monarchy in Iraq.

== Career ==
He worked as a clerk for the Iraqi Law School after it reopened in 1919, and Ibrahim Al-Waidh succeeded him after graduating in the second year.

He held the position of Minister of Finance succeeding Jaafar Abu Al Taman in the Ministry of Hikmat Sulayman in 1937, and he was appointed to the position of Minister without Ministry at the last days of Rashid Ali al-Gaylani's third Ministry and then to the position of Minister of Works and Transport in the fourth Ministry of Rashid Ali al-Gaylani in 1941.

He was then sentenced to 5 years in prison in the Mayes movement case 1941.

He then held the position of Minister of Justice in the seventh ministry of Al Madfaai, in the second ministry of al Jamali and the 12th ministry of Nuri al-Said in addition to holding the position of Deputy Prime Minister in the First al-Jamali Ministry and the position of Acting Minister of Development in addition to holding the position of Minister of Justice in 1954 succeeding the resigned Minister Abdul Majeed Mahmoud Al-Qarah Ghouli.
