= Ali Mahmud al-Shaykh =

Iraqi politician

Ali Mahmud al-Shaykh Ali al-Hiazi al-Obeidi was an Iraqi politician, born on June 3, 1901, in Abu Ghraib.

== Life ==
He entered politics in 1922, when he entered the elections of the House of Representatives and won the Diwaniya Brigade.

He served as Minister of Justice in the Ministry of Hikmat Suleiman as a replacement for Salih Jabr, who resigned in 1937.

He also briefly served as Minister of Foreign Affairs in 1941 in the third ministry of Rashid Ali al-Gaylani, as well as minister of justice in the fourth ministry of Rashid al-Kilani the same year.

After the 1941 Iraqi coup d'état, he was imprisoned on 2 May 1942 and released on 16 June 1947.

He returned to the position of finance minister in the ministry of Mustafa al-Omari for a short time in November 1952 in place of the dismissed minister Ibrahim Shabandar, and then continued his position in the ministry of Noureddine Mahmoud.

== Literature ==
His notes were published in 1985 by the examination and commentary of Dr. Mohammed Hussein al Zubaidi.

In 2015, the research of the master student Mahd Talib in the College of Education - University of Qadisiyah entitled: "Ali Mahmoud Shaykh Ali and his role in the history of Iraq 1901–1958".
