= Ghazwan Jassem =

Iraqi television presenter

Ghazwan Jassem غزوان جاسم
- Born: Ghazwan Jassem; 21 January 1988 (age 38); Baghdad, Iraq
- Education: Baghdad University
- Occupations: Founder & General Manager of Alrabiaa Network Television and Senior TV presenter
- Years active: 2005–present

Ghazwan Jassem (Arabic: غزوان جاسم; born 21 January 1988) is an Iraqi television presenter, Journalist, media personality, and author of TV programs. On 20 July 2018 become executive director of the Asia Network Television and Currently the Founder and General Manager of Alrabiaa Network Television

== Education ==
Ghazwan Jassem Mohan graduated from Baghdad University, specialising in media and received a bachelor's degree in media.

In 2009, he also attended the Academy of Media Industry and took elocution classes from Baghdad University. He currently holds a Diploma in Applied Arts – Department of Architectural Decor and Bachelor of Political.

== Career ==
He worked in several satellite channels, among them:

- Belady TV
- Al Rasheed TV
- Aletejah TV
- Alsumaria
- Dijlah TV
- Asia Network Television since 20 July 2018 (executive director of the channel)
- Founder and General Manager of Alrabiaa Network Television. 2021- Now
