= Qi Card =

Iraqi national credit card

International Smart Card - Qi Card
- Type: Public–private partnership (PPP)
- Industry: Financial services
- Founded: 2007; 19 years ago
- Area served: Worldwide
- Key people: Bahaa Abdul Hussein (Chairman); Ali Munaim (CEO)
- Services: Credit cards; Payment systems
- Revenue: ▲US$1.2 billion (2021)
- Operating income: ▲US$1.4 billion (2022)
- Net income: ▲US$1.8 billion (2022)
- Total assets: ▲US$5.7 billion (2022)
- Total equity: ▲US$6.2 billion (2022)
- Number of employees: 3500 (2022)
- Website: qi.iq

The Qi Card (Arabic: كي كارد), also known as International Smart Card ISC, is an Iraqi debit card and is the national credit card of Iraq. It is pronounced as 'key', and it is the reversed form of IQ, the ISO 3166 code for Iraq. It has about 3,000 employees, as well as 9 million card users. Its capital is estimated at more than 85 billion Iraqi dinars (2021).

== History ==
Iraq's two biggest state-owned banks, Rafidain Bank and Rasheed Bank, together with the Iraqi Electronic Payment System (IEPS) established a company called International Smart Card, which developed a national credit card called 'Qi Card'. The card is issued since 2008. According to the company's website: 'after less than two years of the initial launch of the Qi card solution, we have hit 1.6 million cardholder with the potential to issue 2 million cards by the end of 2010, issuing about 100,000 card monthly is a testament to the huge success of the Qi card solution. Parallel to this will be the expansion into retail stores through a network of points of sales of about 30,000 units by 2015.

QI card is similar to other credit cards recognized worldwide with essential difference that the smart card deals with balances without direct contact with the server which is called (offline) to facilitate business in regions of no good telecommunication networks.
