= Karrada =

District of the city of Baghdad, Iraq

Coordinates: 33°18′N 44°26′E

- District
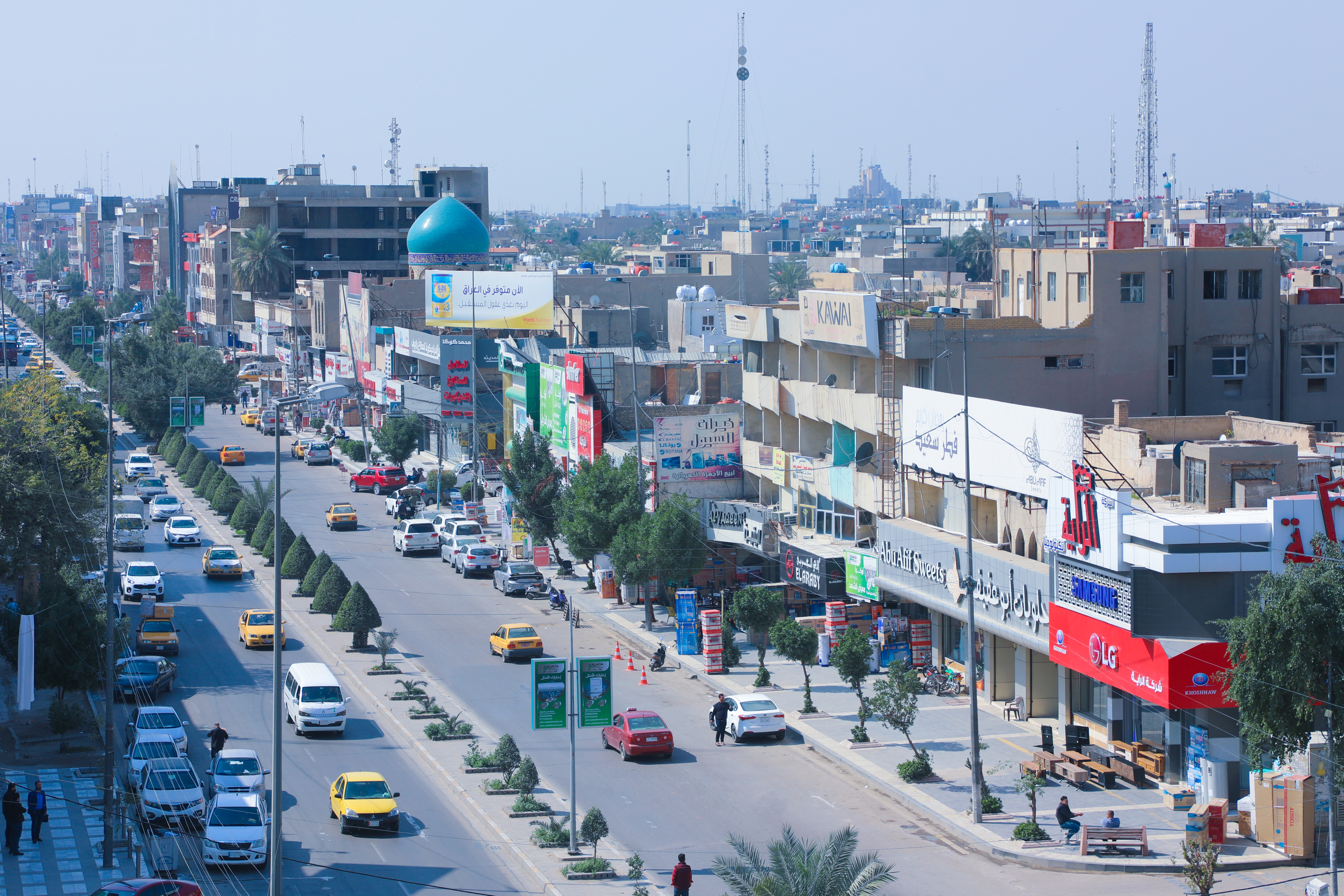
- Karrada as of 2019
- Interactive map of Karrada
- Country: Iraq
- Governorate: Baghdad Governorate
- City: Baghdad
- First settled: 1880s

Area
  - Total: 168 km^{2} (65 sq mi)

Population
  - Total: 322,043
- Time zone: UTC+3

Karrada (Arabic: كرّادة, Karrāda) is an affluent district in the city of Baghdad, Iraq. It covers a large area, divided into western and eastern side by the Tigris. An upper-class district, it is well-known for luxurious hotels, shopping centers and corporate headquarters. The district is home to the largest concentration of Christians in Baghdad.

The district is on the northern part of the peninsula, which was created by a sharp turn in the Tigris River. As a result, Karrada has many of the waterfront properties, making it a desirable and expensive district. One of the wealthiest parts of Baghdad along with Mansour district, it is also home to a large number of companies, organizations, militias and political parties. Most of the city's foreigners and diplomats live in Karrada, as well as prominent politicians, artists, scholars, and businesspersons.

== Bombings ==
The district of Karrada has had multiple terrorist attacks over the years, which occurred in part to the presence of its large Shia and Christian population and wealth. The area is relatively free from sectarianism otherwise, with the actual people of the district coexisting quite well. Al-Naser Airlines had its head office in Karrada, in an area next to al-Jadiryya Private Hospital. On 3 July 2016, an ISIL terrorist attack in the area killed 347 civilians on one of the last evenings marking the end of Ramadan.

== Other districts on the peninsula ==
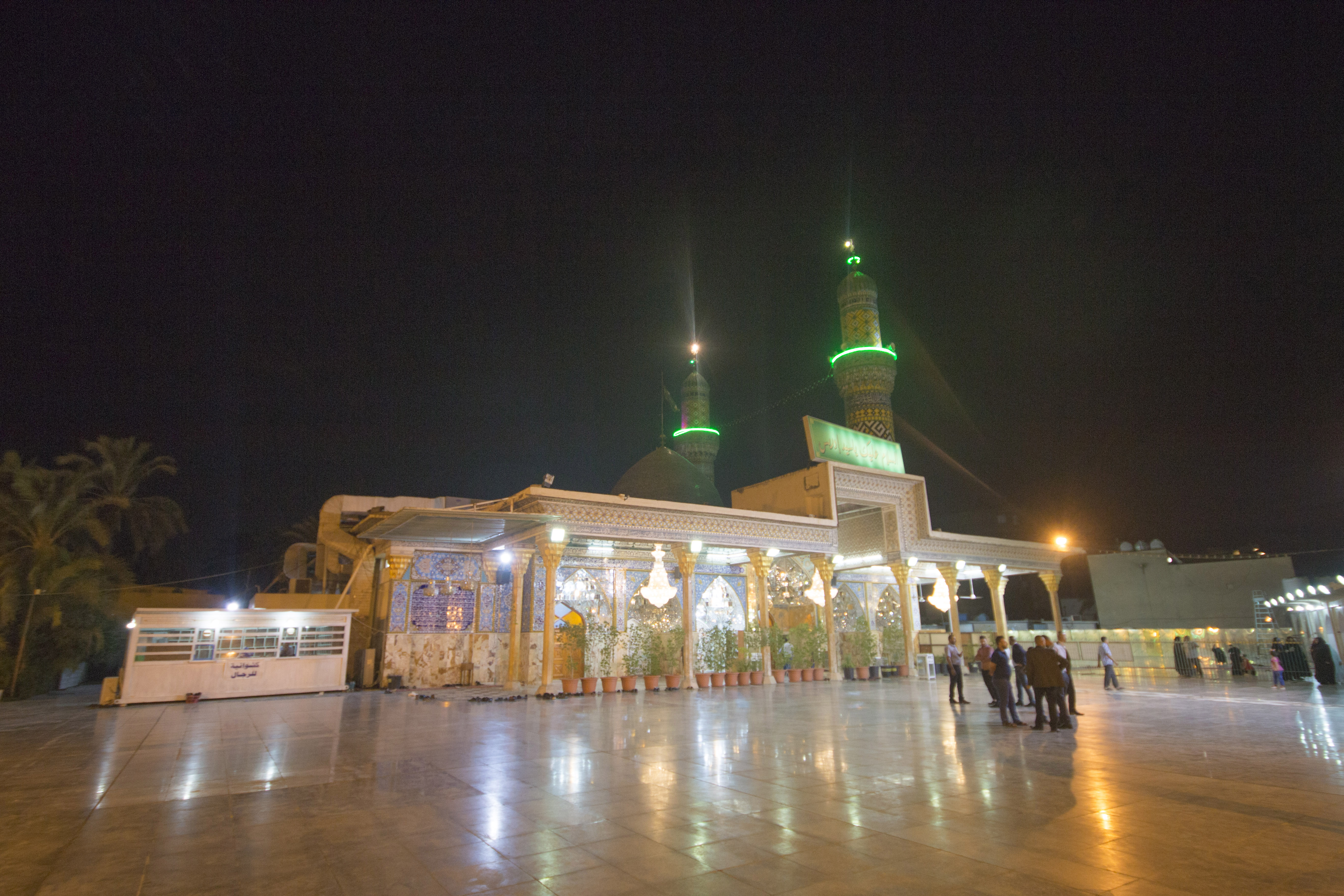
Shrine of Sayyid Idris in Karrada in 2018

Karrada shares the peninsula with Al-Jadriyya district. It is a small district which lies at the southern tip of the peninsula, where the Tigris river makes its major turn and heads to the north-east. Its significance comes from its quality of life, and its real estate is, along with Karrada, some of the most expensive in Baghdad.

The design and building of the University of Baghdad Campus in 1958 also added to its value since the University has become one of the most important locations in the city, and its campus takes up the entire right half of the district. The University of Baghdad campus was designed by Walter Gropius, AIA, Louis Mcmillen and Robert McMillan of The Architects Collaborative. There is one subdistrict of the city: Babil, likely named for the Babylon hotel that has its location in the district.

== Landmarks ==
- National Library

== See also ==
- Kulwatha
- Mayfair
