= Baghdad Soft Drinks Co =

Soft drink company

Baghdad Soft Drinks Co (ISX: IBSD on the Iraq Stock Exchange) is a soft drinks bottling company in Iraq. It is the company that has the exclusive licence to sell Pepsi products in Iraq.

PepsiCo International's franchise agreement authorises Baghdad Soft Drinks Company to produce and distribute PepsiCo's Pepsi-Cola, Seven-Up and Mirinda soft drink brands.

Many bottling companies are franchisees of corporations such as Coca-Cola and PepsiCo who distribute the beverage in a specific geographic region.

It has a staff of ~1,400, and the 2004 agreement with pepsi is expected to create some 2,000 new jobs at Baghdad.

Iraqi Pepsi is currently selling about 7.2 million bottles a month, though this number drops subject to power outages.

== History ==
Pepsi-Cola in Iraq goes back to 1950, when the brand was launched. Pepsi grew to become Iraq's leading soft drink brand, with Baghdad Soft Drinks Company, becoming a Pepsi franchisee in 1984.

However, that relationship ended in 1990, when PepsiCo ceased doing business in Iraq after US and international trade sanctions barred trade with the country.

Hamid Jassim Khamis, serves as managing director, but resigned after he clashed with Uday Hussein, son of the dictator Saddam Hussein, who bought a 10 per cent share of the company.

During the 2003 invasion of Iraq, the local Pepsi-maker was forced to replace authentic PepsiCo concentrates with counterfeit varieties smuggled in from eastern Europe, due to international regulation.

After 2003, Uday Hussein's stake was frozen and Mr Khamis was brought back.

Current Chairman of board of PEPSI Cola in Iraq is Essam Kareem Kzar Alasadi

PepsiCo's rival Coke returned to Iraq in January 2004. A new company with the name The Coca-Cola Bottling Company of Iraq has been set up. Coca-Cola drinks are imported into Iraq from Jordan, Turkey and other neighbouring countries. Pepsi Cola had been the only cola in Iraq since the mid-1960s Arab League boycott of Israel, because of Coke's investments in Israel.

Through local lawyers, PepsiCo is trying to re-register its trademark in Iraq, hoping for a crackdown on counterfeiters.

== See also ==
- Economy of Iraq
