= Ministry of Finance (Iraq) =

Government ministry of Iraq

Coordinates: 33°21′18″N 44°23′47″E

Republic of Iraq Ministry of Finance
- وزارة المالية
- Coat of arms of Iraq

Agency overview
- Formed: 1920
- Jurisdiction: Government of Iraq
- Headquarters: Bab al-Muadham, Baghdad, Iraq
- Minister responsible: Falih al-Sari, Minister
- Child agency: see Agencies
- Website: www.mof.gov.iq

The Ministry of Finance (MoF; Arabic: وزارة المالية) is a central government ministry of Iraq tasked with formulating financial policies of the state, preparing the general budget bill, and overseeing as well as managing public expenditure. The banks of Rafidain and Rasheed, as well several other enterprises, are operated by the ministry. It publishes a monthly report called the Open Budget Survey.

The headquarters is located in Bab al-Muadham, east of the river Tigris, Baghdad. The incumbent Minister of Finance since 14 May 2026 is Falih al-Sari.

== Overview ==
The goal of the ministry is to lay the groundwork for nation-wide sustainable economic development by preparing as well as implementing financial policies and reform programmes, managing state assets, collaborating with the private sector and international financial institutions, and providing economic analysis in accordance with the national strategy.

Among the tasks of the ministry is managing and organizing state funds, monitoring their proper use and guaranteeing the availability of cash liquidity, managing the treasury and monitoring the soundness of its use and enhancing its sources of replenishment, regulating banking, insurance, taxation and customs, taking part in drafting legislation, providing consultation and training personnel.

== Organizational structure ==
The ministry is composed of the following departments that oversee and implement its functions:

- Administrative Department
- Legal Department
- Accounting Department
- Budget Department
- Economics Department
- Public Dept Department
- Information Technology Department
- State Real Estate Department
- Inspector General's Office
- Financial and Accounting Training Center

== Agencies ==
=== Bodies ===
- General Customs Authority
- Public Pension Body
- General Commission for Taxes
- General Authority for Free Zones

=== Funds ===
- Iraqi Fund for External Development (IFED)

=== Companies ===
- National Insurance Company
- National Reinsurance Company
- Iraqi Company for Banking Services

=== Banks ===
- Rafidain Bank
- Rasheed Bank
- Agricultural Cooperative Bank of Iraq
- Industrial Bank of Iraq
- Real Estate Bank of Iraq
- Trade Bank of Iraq
- Al-Nahrain Islamic Bank

== Challenges ==
Ali Allawi, former finance minister, stated in 2024 that less than $1 billion of the $7 billion in annual customs duties reached the treasury, with militias diverting most of the remaining funds.

== Ministers of Finance in the Kingdom of Iraq ==
- Sassoon Eskell, October 1920 – August 1921
- Sassoon Eskell, September 1921 – November 1923
- Abdel Mohsen Shalash, November 1923 – August 1924
- Sassoon Eskell, August 1924 – June 1925
- Abdul-Muhsin Al-Saadoun, June 1925 – November 1926
- Yasin al-Hashimi, November 1926 – January 1928
- Yousef Ghanima, January 1928 – April 1929
- Yasin al-Hashimi, April 1929 – March 1930
- Ali Jawdat al-Aiyubi, March 1930 – September 1930
- Rustum Haidar, September 1930 – October 1932
- Nasrat al-Farisi, November 1932 – March 1933
- Yasin al-Hashimi, March 1933 – October 1933
- Nasrat al-Farisi, November 1933 – February 1934
- Naji al-Suwaydi, February 1934 – August 1934
- Yousef Ghanima, August 1934 – May 1935
- Raouf Al Bahrani, May 1935 – October 1936
- Ja'far Abu al-Timman, October 1936 – June 1937
- Mohammed Ali Mahmoud, June 1937 – August 1937
- Ibrahim Kemal, August 1937 – December 1938
- Rustum Haidar, December 1938 – January 1940
- Raouf Al Bahrani, February 1940 – March 1940
- Naji al-Suwaydi, March 1940 – February 1941
- Ali Mumtaz al-Daftary, February 1941 – April 1941
- Naji al-Suwaydi, April 1941 – May 1941
- Ibrahim Kemal, May 1941 – October 1941
- Ali Mumtaz al-Daftary, October 1941 – October 1942
- Salih Jabr, October 1942 – June 1943
- Jalal Baban, June 1943 – October 1943
- Abd al-Ilah Hafiz, October 1943 – December 1943
- Ali Mumtaz al-Daftary, December 1943 – June 1944
- Salih Jabr, June 1944 – January 1946
- Abdul Wahab Mahmoud, February 1946 – June 1946
- Yousef Ghanima, June 1946 – November 1946
- Salih Jabr, November 1946 – December 1946
- Abd al-Ilah Hafiz, December 1946 – March 1947
- Yousef Ghanima, March 1947 – January 1948
- Sadiq Bassam, January 1948 – June 1948
- Ali Mumtaz al-Daftary, June 1948 – September 1948
- Khalil Ismael, September 1948 – January 1949
- Jalal Baban, January 1949 – December 1949
- Ali Mumtaz al-Daftary, December 1949 – February 1950
- Abdul Karim al-Azri, February 1950 – September 1950
- Abd al-Wahhab Mirjan, September 1950 – July 1952
- Ibrahim al-Shabandar, July 1952 – November 1952
- Ali Mahmud al-Shaykh, November 1952 – January 1953
- Ali Mumtaz al-Daftary, January 1953 – September 1953
- Abdul Karim al-Azri, September 1953 – February 1954
- Ali Mumtaz al-Daftary, February 1954 – April 1954
- Abdel-Majeed Mahmoud Al-Qara Ghouli, April 1954 – June 1954
- Dhia Jafar, September 1954 – December 1955
- Khalil Kanna, December 1955 – June 1957
- Ali Mumtaz al-Daftary, June 1957 – December 1957
- Nadim al-Pachachi, December 1957
- Abdul Karim al-Azri, December 1957 – May 1958
- Nadim al-Pachachi, May 1958 – July 1958
- Abdul Karim al-Azri, May 1958– July 1958 (Arab Federation government)

== Ministers of Finance in the Republic of Iraq ==
- Mohammed Hadid, July 1958 – March 1960
- Hashem Jawad, March 1960 – November 1960
- Muzaffar Hussain Jamil, November 1960 – February 1963
- Saleh Kubba, February 1963 – May 1963
- Muhammad Jawad al-Ubasi, May 1963 – November 1963
- Salman al-Aswad, September 1965
- Shukri Saleh Zaki, September 1965 – August 1966
- Abdullah al-Naqshabandi, August 1966 – May 1967
- Abdul Rahman al-Habib, May 1967 – July 1968
- Saleh Kubba, July 1968
- Amin Abd al-Karim, July 1968 – November 1974
- Saadi Ibrahim, November 1974 – October 1975
- Fawzi Abdullah al-Qaisi, May 1976 – July 1979
- Thamir Razzuqi, July 1979 – August 1983
- Hisham Hassan Tawfiq, August 1983 – September 1987
- Hikmat Omar Mukhaylif, September 1987 – October 1989
- Muhammad Mahdi Salih, October 1989 – March 1991
- Majid Abd Jafar, March 1991 – July 1992
- Ahmad Husayn Khudayir as-Samarrai, July 1992 – May 1994
- Hikmat Mizban Ibrahim al-Azzawi, May 1994 – April 2003
- Kamel al-Kilani, 2003–2004
- Adil Abdul-Mahdi, 2004–2005
- Ali Allawi, 2005–2006
- Baqir Jabr al-Zubeidi, 2006–2010
- Rafi al-Issawi, 2010–2013
- Ali Yousif al-Shukri, 2013
- Safa al-Safi, 2013–2014
- Najeeba Najeeb, 2014
- Mohammed Shia' Al Sudani, 2014
- Hoshiyar Zebari, 2014–2016
- Abdul Razzaq al-Issa, 2016–2018
- Fuad Hussein, 2018–2020
- Ali Allawi, 2020–2022
- Taif Sami, 2022–2026
- Falih al-Sari 2026–present

== See also ==
- Ministry of Trade
- Ministry of Planning
- Ministry of Industry
