= Al Naser Wings Airlines =

Al Naser Wings Airlines أجنحة الناصر Ajnihat Alnnasir
IATA	ICAO	Call sign
NG	NAD	AL-NASER
- Founded: 2005
- Commenced operations: 2009
- Ceased operations: April 16, 2019
- Hubs: Baghdad International Airport
- Focus cities: Damascus International Airport
- Fleet size: 1
- Destinations: 12
- Headquarters: Baghdad, Baghdad Governorate, Iraq
- Website: alnaserwings.com

Al Naser Wings Airlines (Arabic: أجنحة الناصر), formerly known as Al-Naser Airlines, was a small Iraqi airline based in Karrada, Baghdad, Iraq. The airline operated scheduled domestic flights to places in the Middle East, mostly to Damascus, Syria. On 24 February 2019, Al Naser Wings filed for bankruptcy, and on 16 April 2019, the airline ceased all flight operations.

== History ==
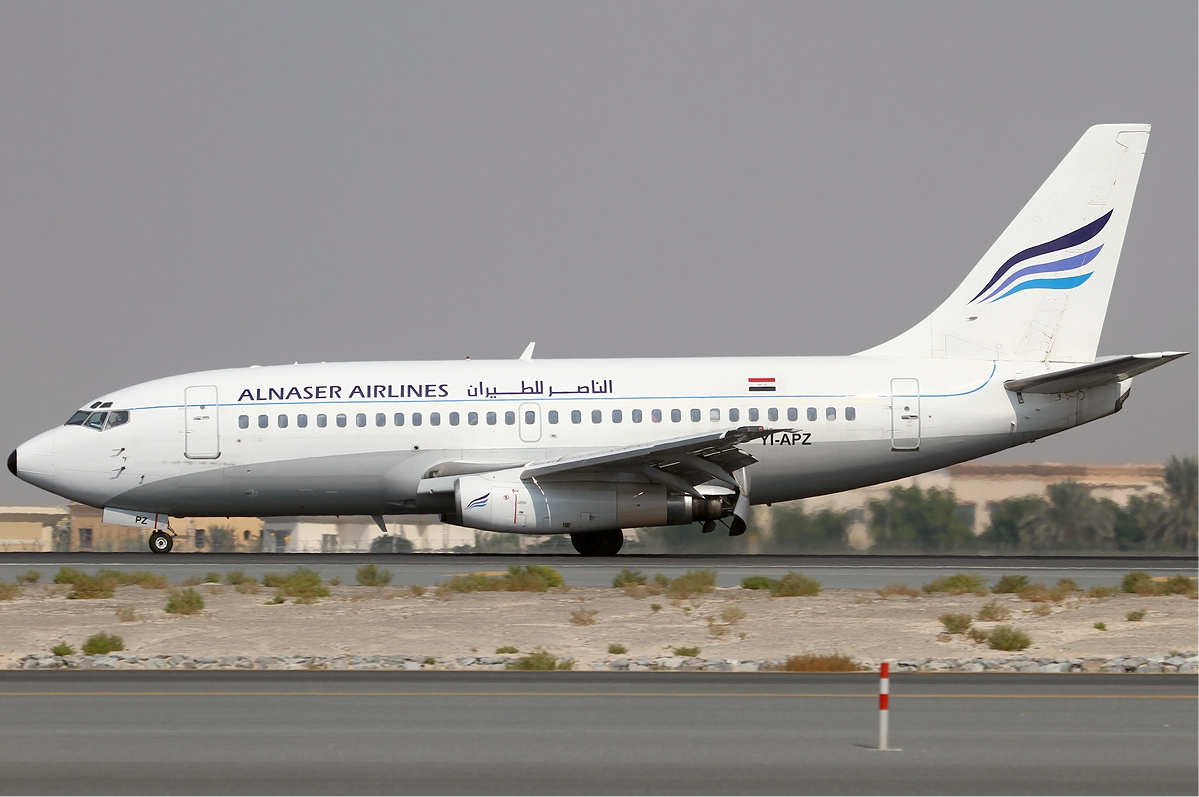
An Al-Naser Airlines Boeing 737-200 at Dubai International Airport, United Arab Emirates

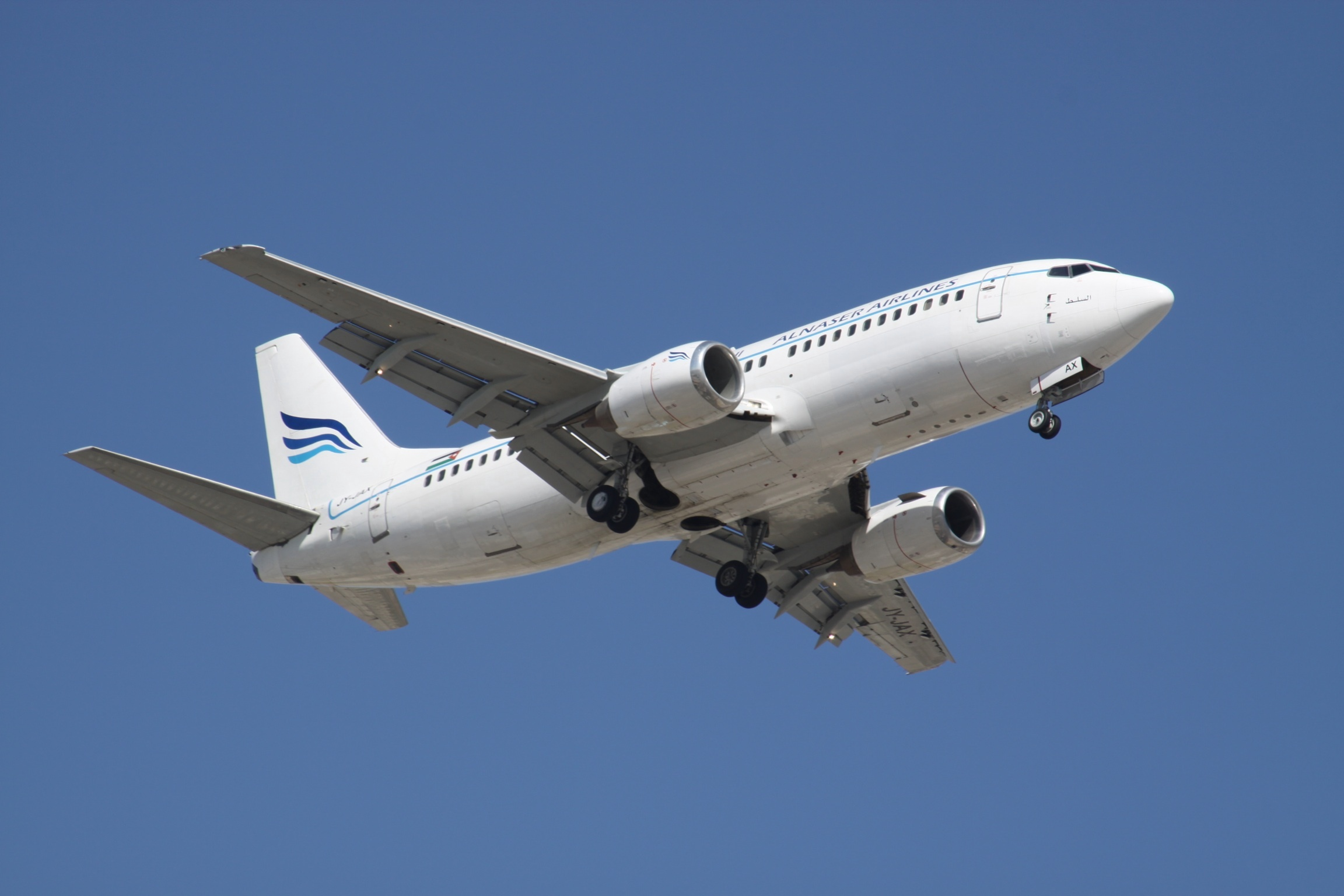
An Al-Naser Airlines Boeing 737-300 landing at Dubai International Airport, United Arab Emirates

Al-Naser Airlines is registered with the Civil Aviation Authority of Iraq to hold an air operator's certificate. It started operating in 2005 for the US military in Iraq, and in 2009 entered the civil sector operating its first flight to Kuwait in February 2009. In 2017 Al-Naser Airlines was renamed Al Naser Wings Airlines.

== Destinations ==
Prior to closing, Al-Naser offered flights to the following destinations:

Al Naser Wings Airlines destinations
Country	City	Airport	Airport codes		Notes	Refs
Country	City	Airport	IATA	ICAO	Notes	Refs
Armenia	Yerevan	Zvartnots International Airport	EVN	UDYZ		
Azerbaijan	Baku	Heydar Aliyev International Airport	GYD	UBBB		
Bahrain	Muharraq	Bahrain International Airport	BAH	OBBI	Terminated	
Iran	Isfahan	Isfahan International Airport	IFN	OIFM		
Iran	Mashhad	Mashhad International Airport	MHD	OIMM		
Iran	Tehran	Imam Khomeini International Airport	IKA	OIIE	Terminated	
Iraq	Baghdad	Baghdad International Airport	BGW	ORBI	Hub	
Iraq	Basra	Basra International Airport	BSR	ORMM		
Iraq	Erbil	Erbil International Airport	EBL	ORER	Terminated	
Iraq	Najaf	Al Najaf International Airport	NJF	ORNI		
Jordan	Amman	Queen Alia International Airport	AMM	OJAI	Terminated	
Lebanon	Beirut	Beirut–Rafic Hariri International Airport	BEY	OLBA	Terminated	
Syria	Damascus	Damascus International Airport	DAM	OSDI		
Turkey	Istanbul	Istanbul Airport	IST	LTFM		

== Fleet ==
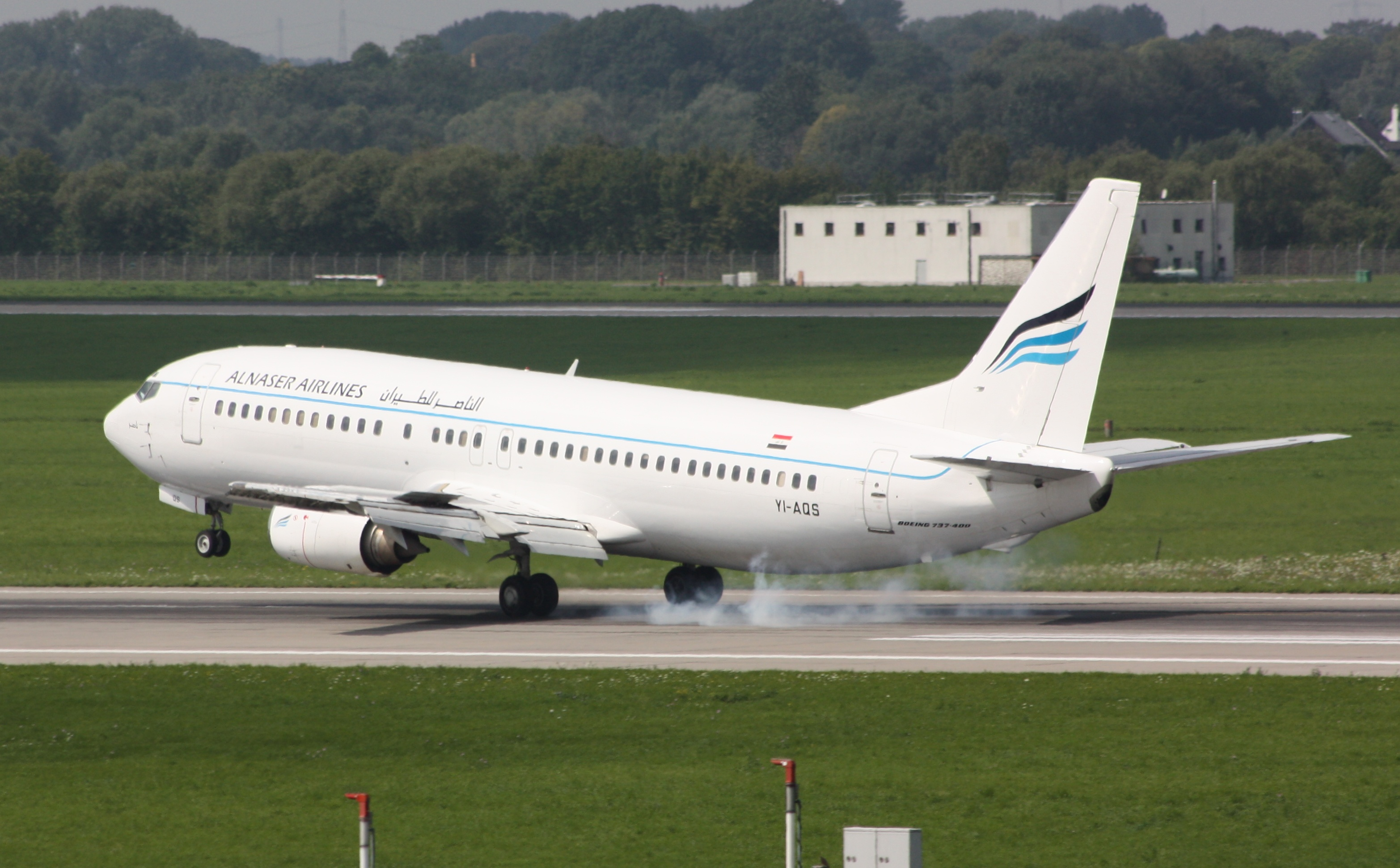
Al Naser Airlines Boeing 737-400 lands at Düsseldorf Airport, Germany.

The Al Naser Wings Airlines fleet consisted of the following aircraft as of August 2017:

Al Naser Wings Airlines fleet
Aircraft	In service	Orders	Passengers	Notes
Boeing 737-400	1	—	168	
Total	1	—		

=== Previously operated ===
- Airbus A340-600
- Airbus A340-300
- Boeing 737-200
- Boeing 767-223
