= Islamic Cooperation Investment Bank =

Bank of Iraq

Taawen Islamic Bank
- Industry: Financial services
- Founded: 2006; 19 years ago
- Number of locations: 11
- Website: icb-fi.com

Islamic Cooperation Investment Bank, also known as Taawen Islamic Bank (Arabic: مصرف التعاون الاسلامي للاستثمار) is a private bank in Iraq that was established in 2006. The bank has 10 branches across Iraq and one branch in Tehran, Iran. It is one of the five foreign banks with an office in Iran as of 2017.

== See also ==
- List of banks in Iraq
