= Industrial Bank of Iraq =

Bank company based in Baghdad, Iraq

- Native name: المصرف الصناعي العراقي
- Type: State-owned
- Industry: Banking
- Founded: 1935; 91 years ago
- Headquarters: Baghdad, Iraq
- Key people: Mr. Bilal Al-Hamdani (Director-general)
- Products: Financial Services
- Total assets: IQD 4.1 trillion (2025)
- Website: indbk.gov.iq

Industrial Bank of Iraq (INBK) (Arabic: المصرف الصناعي العراقي) is an Iraqi state-owned commercial bank headquartered in Baghdad. Established in 1935, the bank operates under the administrative supervision of the Iraqi Ministry of Finance and is regulated by the Central Bank of Iraq. As of 2025, it is the third smallest of Iraq’s seven state-owned banks by assets, with total assets valued at IQD 4.1 trillion. It also operates a nationwide network of 15 branches. The bank primarily provides retail and commercial banking services, with particular emphasis on financing industrial projects across Iraq.

== History ==
=== Establishment ===
The Industrial Bank of Iraq was established in 1935 as one of Iraq's first two state-owned banks, alongside with the Post Office Bank. Originally known as the Agro-Industrial Bank, its primary purpose was to finance both agricultural and industrial activities. The bank commenced operations on 1 April 1936.

In 1940, amid growing demand for agricultural, commercial and industrial credit, the Iraqi government separated the institution's agricultural and industrial financing functions, establishing a separate Agricultural Bank as well as an Industrial Bank. The Industrial Bank of Iraq began operating independently in 1946, after delays due to the onset of World War II, and was focused on financing the industrial sector.

=== Since 1958 ===
Under the First Republic of Iraq, the bank was reorganised and transferred from the Ministry of the Economy to the Ministry of Industry, reflecting the government's increased emphasis on industrial development. By the end of 1958, the INBK held investments valued at IQD 1.335 million across ten public sector industrial companies, of which 41% was invested in textiles, 36% in construction related industries, 17% in food industries, and 6% in leather industries. In 1964, all of Iraq's banks were nationalised and consolidated into the Rafidain Bank, with the exception of four specialised state-owned banks, including the INBK.

Following the Iraqi invasion of Kuwait in 1990, the bank operated amid the severe economic disruption caused by the subsequent international sanctions against Iraq, which restricted the country's trade and access to financial resources needed for industrial growth. On 6 October 1996, Iraq's specialised banks were allowed to conduct commercial banking activities in addition to their statutory functions. The INBK subsequently expanded beyond industrial financing into general banking services.

=== Today ===
Following the 2003 invasion of Iraq, the INBK was the most severely affected of Iraq's four specialised banks. An estimated IQD 1.6 billion (then approximately US$ 1.1 million) was looted from its five branches. The bank was slow to resume operations in the aftermath, owing to cash shortages and the loss of most of its paper records, which complicated efforts to verify depositors' claims and borrowers' outstanding obligations.

In 2025, the Iraqi government appointed Ernst & Young to oversee the restructuring of six of the country's seven state-owned banks, including the INBK. The following year, the Iraqi Ministry of Finance proposed merging the INBK with the Agricultural Cooperative Bank of Iraq as part of broader restructuring of the two banks' assets, liabilities, and workforce, with the aim of bringing their operations into line with international banking standards.

== See also ==
- List of banks in Iraq

== Official website ==
- Official website
