= Bank of Baghdad =

Iraqi bank

- Type: Private bank
- Traded as: ISX: BBOB
- ISIN: IQ000A0M7SY8
- Industry: Banking
- Founded: 1992; 34 years ago
- Headquarters: Baghdad, Iraq
- Number of locations: 36
- Key people: Usam Sharif (Chairman); Youssef A Nasr (CEO)
- Products: Financial services
- Revenue: IQD 215 billion (2025) (USD 164 million)
- Operating income: IQD 324 billion (2025) (USD 247 million)
- Total assets: IQD 2,89 billion (2025) (USD 2,2 billion)
- Total equity: IQD 703 billion (2025) (USD 537 million)
- Owner: Jordan Kuwait Bank (51%)
- Number of employees: 1153 (2025)
- Website: www.bankofbaghdad.com

The Bank of Baghdad, is a major Iraqi bank. It was established in 1992.

== History ==
The bank was established on December 18, 1992, following a crucial amendment to the Central Bank of Iraq Law that allowed for the creation of private commercial banking entities.

In 2005, Bahraini United Gulf Bank (UGB) and the Iraq Holding Company acquired a majority stake in the bank.

In 2009, Kuwaiti Burgan Bank acquired UGB's stake, increasing its share to 51.8%.

The Bank of Baghdad opened its first branch in Beirut, Lebanon in 2012.

In early 2023, Jordan Kuwait Bank acquired Burgan Bank stake.

== See also ==
- Economy of Iraq
- Central Bank of Iraq
