= Babylon Bank =

Bank of Iraq

Babylon Bank مصرف بابل
- Type: Private bank
- Industry: Finance and Insurance
- Founded: 1998
- Headquarters: Baghdad, Iraq
- Products: Financial services
- Number of employees: 176
- Website: www.babylonbank-iq.com

Babylon Bank (ISX: BBAY) is a commercial bank in Baghdad, Iraq. It was established in 1999. The bank has 12 branches in Baghdad, Mosul, Najaf, Karbala and Nasiriyah.

== History ==
Babylon Bank was listed on the ISX (Iraqi Stock Exchange) on July 8, 2004.

As of the end of 2023, BBAY was operating with 12 branches (3 of which were in Baghdad) and employed 176 people.

== See also ==
- Economy of Iraq
- Central Bank of Iraq
