= Iraqi Islamic Bank =

Islamic Bank In Iraq

Iraqi Islamic Bank for Investment and Development
- Company type: Privately-held company
- Industry: Banking
- Headquarters: 14 Ramadan Street Al-Mansoor Baghdad, Iraq
- Products: Financial Services
- Website: iraqiislamicb.iq

Iraqi Islamic Bank For Investment & Development is an Iraqi commercial bank, headquartered in Baghdad with 14 branches throughout Iraq.

The Iraqi Islamic Bank (IIB) was the first Islamic Bank established in Iraq; initially approved by the Iraqi Central Bank on December 19, 1992, and opened its door to the public on 23 February 1993.

As an Islamic Bank (IIB) upholding the Noble Shariah Banking rules & Principles; IIB has contributed to the organic development of the Iraqi Society as part of its effective push for the process of development and the fight against poverty.

IIB has been an integral part in providing Trade, Corporate and Project Finance for both public and private sectors. Moreover, IIB has a Corporate Finance Advisory Division; a Strategic Business unit (SBU) advising and engaging corporate clients through a diverse market segments and providing them with solutions tailored to their funding requirements. In addition to trade, corporate and project finance, IIB corporate clients have the majority of the Global Oil business in Basra, acting in their capacity as subs for referenced global Oil companies.

IIB is the only Commercial Bank approved as the Principal Agent for MasterCard in Iraq. IIB has a major network of regional and global correspondents, inclusive of:

1. Fransabank. 2. Alubaf Bahrain. 3. UBAF Paris. 4. Credit Libanais. 5. UBAE Italy. 6. Lebanon & Gulf Bank.
