= United Gulf Bank =

Bank of Bahrain

- Native name: United Gulf Bank B.S.C.
- Industry: Financial services
- Founded: 1980
- Headquarters: UGB Tower, Diplomatic Area, PO Box 5964, Manama, Bahrain
- Website: www.ugbbh.com

United Gulf Bank (UGB) is a commercial bank located in Manama, Bahrain, founded in 1980.

UGB works under a wholesale banking licence from the Central Bank of Bahrain and is listed on the Bahrain Stock Exchange. From 1988 is a member of the Kuwait Projects Company Holding (KIPCO).

The bank building, UGB Tower, designed by SOM, contains elements of the local architecture and energy saving features for the high-rise office buildings.

== See also ==
- List of banks in Bahrain
- List of banks in Asia
