= Jordan Kuwait Bank =

- Industry: Finance
- Founded: October 25, 1976
- Headquarters: Amman, Jordan
- Key people: Nasser A. Lozi, Chairman
- Products: Financial services
- Revenue: ~ US$85 mm 2006
- Number of employees: 947
- Website: www.jkb.com

Jordan Kuwait Bank, a Jordanian public shareholding company, was founded in 1976 and has successfully evolved into a major player in the Jordanian banking system over the last few years. The bank currently operates a domestic network of 62 branches and offices distributed throughout Jordan in addition to a branch in Cyprus. The bank's paid-up capital was gradually increased from JD 5 million in 1976 to JD 100 million (USD 141 m) in 2008. According to the bank's website, its philosophy rests on the concept of bringing capital into Jordan from other Arab countries, especially Kuwait.

== Related organizations ==
Jordan Kuwait Bank holds a controlling shares of more than 50% in the United Financial Investments Company (Jordan) and a 10% stake in Gulf Bank Algeria.

In 2018, it acquired 10% of Al Quds Bank. Following the deal, the Jordan Kuwait Bank's branches in Palestine were merged with Al Quds Bank.
