= Trade Bank of Iraq =

Government owned Bank In Iraq

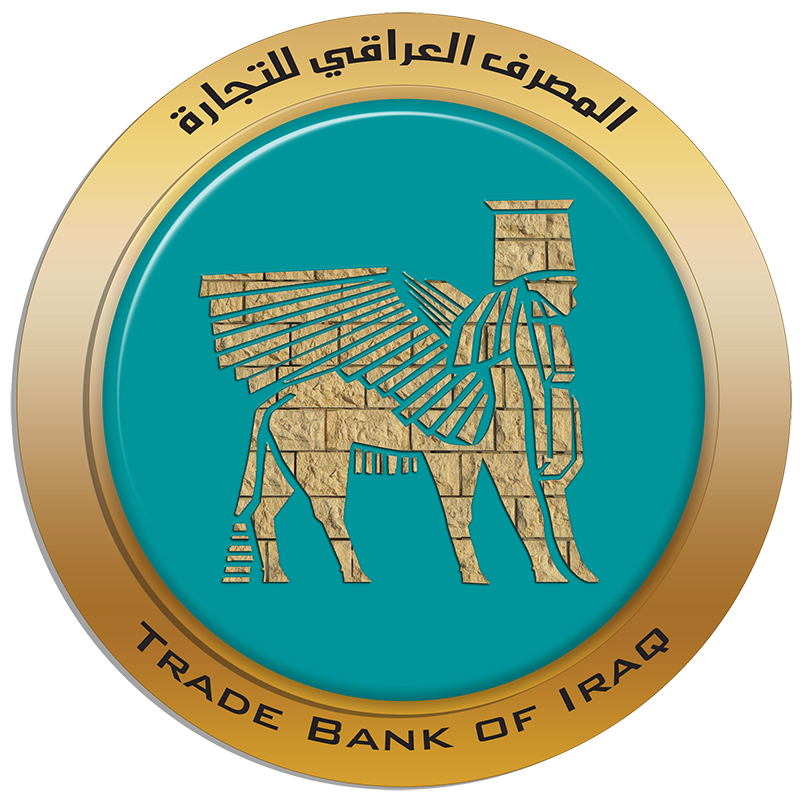
- Native name: المصرف العراقي للتجارة
- Type: Government-owned corporation
- Industry: Banking
- Founded: 2003
- Headquarters: Building 11, Al-Rasheed Street, Baghdad, Iraq
- Key people: Bilal Sabah Hussain; President and Chairman of the Board of Directors
- Products: Financial services
- Website: tbi.com.iq

Trade Bank of Iraq (TBI; Arabic: المصرف العراقي للتجارة) was established on 17 July 2003 to facilitate Iraq's domestic and international trade dealings once the United Nations Oil-for-Food Programme ended in 2003.

== History ==
TBI was established by the Coalition Provisional Authority on the 17th of July 2003 as an independent government entity to provide financial services to facilitate import and export of goods and services to and from Iraq. TBI was licensed by the Central Bank of Iraq and commenced its operations one month after the decision to establish it as a government financial institution had been taken. Since then, TBI has grown into a leading bank in Iraq through strengthening its financial position, assets, and equity. TBI started with paid-up capital of US$5 million (authorised capital: USD 100 million) in July 2003 and the paid-up capital increased on 2020 to $3 billion from $2.3 billion in 2019 as part of its plan to raise the bank's financial strength in line with the new strategic vision for 2020–23. TBI recorded an annual profit of US$454 million during 2016. The bank quickly developed into an organization with an asset base of US$19.7 billion as at the close of 2016.[1]

In its first year of operation TBI was associated with a consortium of international banks led by JPMorgan Chase. During the startup period, the consortium offered TBI technical support and banking know-how and it has been issuing and confirming letters of credit and letters of guarantee on behalf of TBI. The consortium remains at the heart of TBI's correspondent network and has been a key element in the successful growth of TBI's trade business.

In a short period, TBI built relationships with an international network of 134 correspondent banks covering 63 cities spread over 39 countries.

TBI's initial customer base consisted of ministries and government-run public sector corporations. During its first year of operation, TBI opened letters of credit only for the public sector clients. During 2005, the bank's customer base widened to include private sector companies and clients. TBI also started granting credit facilities and loans to the private sector in 2005.

== Products and services ==
Financial products include saving accounts, current accounts, Priority Banking (Jumar), term deposits, certificate of deposits (tistahel), payroll accounts, Automated Clearing House (ACH), real-time gross settlement (RTGS), debit cards, credit cards, Automated Teller Machine (ATM), Point of Sale (POS), E-commerce, Cash Management, Foreign Exchange, trade services, Trade Finance, Personal loans, Car Loans, Term Finance, Working Capital Finance and Project Finance. TBI also finances salaried employees, getting their salaries through their accounts in TBI for purchasing vehicle, house and to meet their personal requirements.

== Offices ==
=== Domestic offices ===
TBI has 25 domestic offices in most major cities within the country, starting with the capital, Baghdad, and the Kurdistan Region's capital city of Erbil and its second largest city of Sulaimaniyah, and other cities in central and southern Iraq which includes Basra, Najaf, Karbala, Hilla, Kut, Nasiriyah, Amarah, Ramadi and Tikrit. The bank is working on expanding its network of branches to cover all the governorates of Iraq In the future.

=== Foreign offices ===
TBI opened a Representative Office at Abu Dhabi Global Market in UAE on 26 November 2017. It is the bank's first office outside of Iraq.

TBI also opened a branch in Riyadh, Saudi Arabia in April 2019.

== See also ==
- List of banks in Iraq
- Iraqi dinar
- Central Bank of Iraq
