= Iraq Stock Exchange =

Stock exchange in Iraq

Coordinates: 33°18′23″N 44°25′35″E

Iraq Stock Exchange (ISX)
- سوق العراق للأوراق المالية
- Type: Stock Exchange
- Location: Karrada, Baghdad, Iraq
- Founded: 2004
- Key people: Taha Ahmad al-Rubaie (Executive Director)
- Currency: IQD
- Website: isx-iq.net

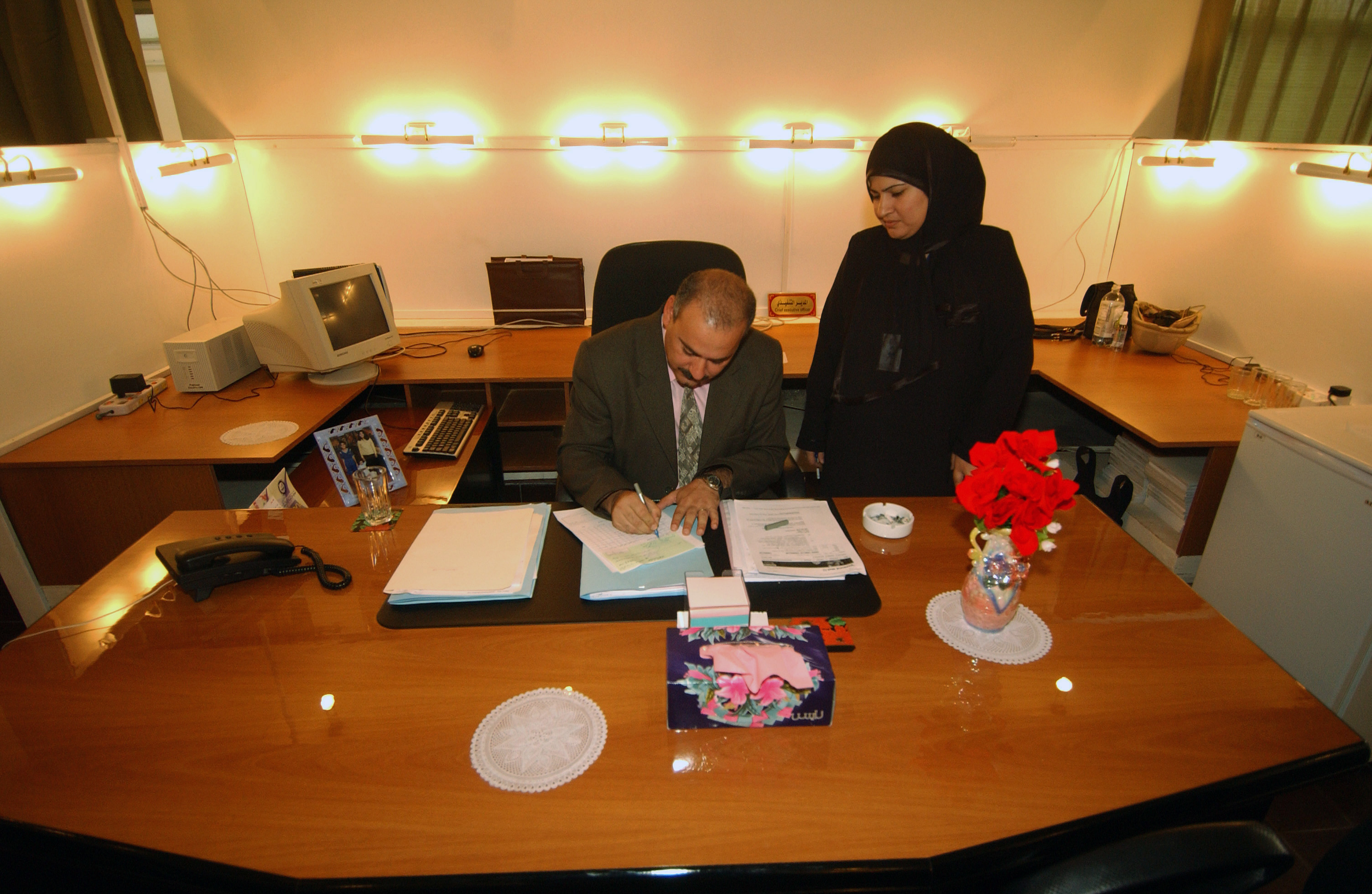
Former Iraq Stock Exchange CEO Taha Abdulsalam in 2004.

The Iraq Stock Exchange (ISX), formerly the Baghdad Stock Exchange, is an Iraqi stock exchange located in Baghdad, Iraq. It was established by the Coalition Provisional Authority (CPA) Order No. 74 as a sui generis independent non-profit organization on April 18, 2004. This order also created the Iraq Securities Commission and an Iraq Depositary. The stock exchange was part of the development of the country from a non-transparent centrally planned economy to a free market economy through a dynamic private sector.

The Iraq Stock Exchange was incorporated and began operations on June 24, 2004. It operates under the oversight of the Iraq Securities Commission, an independent commission modeled after the U.S. Securities and Exchange Commission. This body, which supervises the Board of Governors, initially served as the bridge between the country's previous state-owned stock exchange and the new independent exchange.

The ISX uses electronic systems provided by Nasdaq, including a Central Depository System and an Electronic Trading System. There are five trading sessions per week.

The ISX tracks two principal stock indices, the ISX60 Price Index and the ISX15 Free Float Maket Capitalization Index, which tracks the performance of top-tier ISX-listed equities, including Bank of Baghdad, Al-Mansour Investment Bank, Iraqi National Bank, Commercial Bank of Iraq, Asiacell Communications, and Baghdad Soft Drinks Company.

The Iraq stock Exchange is a member of the Federation of Euro-Asian Stock Exchanges.

== Background and Growth ==
Before the 2003 invasion of Iraq, the country's stock exchange was called the Baghdad Stock Exchange and was operated by the Iraqi Ministry of Finance. Now it is a self-regulated organization similar to the New York Stock Exchange, owned by the 50 or so member brokerages.

The ISX opened in 2004 with 15 companies. Turnover of shares in 2005 was approximately US$5 million per trading session. Originally, trading was with pen and paper. Buyers shouted at or called into their brokers, who stood near their whiteboards that listed each company's share buy and sell price.

Trading was suspended for several months in 2006 due to violence, and was subject to power outages. In 2006, 92 trading sessions were held (an average of 2 per week), 57 billion shares were traded (at a value of 146 billion dinars), and 38,000 trades were consummated.

The ISX opened to foreign investors on August 2, 2007. It was unaffected by the 2008 financial crisis.

On April 19, 2009, the ISX switched to electronic trading. Currently, only five companies are available for electronic trading, but more will be added over the next few months.

In the first quarter of 2018, the ISX became one of the world's top performers due to the influx of investors encouraged by the defeat of the Islamic state. Companies listed on the market increased by 10 percent, anticipating economic recovery due to recent developments. This is particularly notable since the performance defied the violent swings experienced by global markets in the same period. The ISX, however, still faces a number of challenges, which include political instability as demonstrated by the 7 percent loss in value during the May election, sporadic conflicts, and the price of oil, among other economic grievances.

As of July 2026, the ISX had 126 listed companies.

== See also ==
- Economy of Iraq
- List of Asian stock exchanges
- Development Fund for Iraq
- 2010 Baghdad church attack
