= Basrah International Bank for Investment =

Bank of Iraq

- Company type: Private bank
- Industry: Banking
- Founded: Iraq, 1993
- Headquarters: Baghdad, Iraq
- Products: Financial Services
- Website: www.basrahbankfz.com

Basrah International Bank for Investment (Arabic: مصرف البصرة الدولي للاستثمار) is an Iraqi commercial bank, with headquarters in Baghdad.

The bank has 12 branches in Baghdad (5 branches), Basrah (4 branches), Najaf (2 branches) and one branch in the Free Zone in Damascus.

== See also ==
- Iraqi dinar
