= Gulf Commercial Bank =

Bank of Iraq

- Type: private corporation
- Industry: Banking
- Founded: Iraq, 2000
- Headquarters: Baghdad, Iraq
- Products: Financial Services
- Website: https://www.gcb.iq

Gulf Commercial Bank (Arabic: مصرف الخليج التجاري) is an Iraqi commercial bank, headquartered in Baghdad.

The bank has 12 branches in Baghdad, Basrah, Najaf, Kerbala, Diwaniyeh, Babylon and Erbil.

== History ==
Gulf Commercial Bank is a Private Joint Shareholding Company incorporated under the in Corporation Certificate no. CR / 7002 dated 10/20/1999 issued from Companies Registrar according to Companies Law No. (21) for 1997 (amended) with a capital of (600) million Iraq dinar Fully paid, the Gulf Commercial Bank Started Banking business through the main branch on 1/4/2000 after receiving banking licence issued from Central Bank of Iraq with the Number B.C 9/3/115 dated 02.07.2000 according to its law No. (64) for 1976 (canceled) to Bract ice its banking business, the in Corporation contract had been amended by increasing the bank capital several times to finally reach (300,000) billion Iraqi dinar after the legal procedures completed on 07.11.2014 by companies registrar according to their letter no. 26790 dated 07.11.2014 the accounting records had been recorded on 12/12/2014, after reusing the deposit y the Central Bank of Iraq.

== See also ==
- Iraqi dinar
