= Agricultural Cooperative Bank of Iraq =

Bank of Iraq

- Native name: المصرف الزراعي التعاوني العراقي
- Type: State-owned
- Industry: Banking
- Founded: 1935; 91 years ago
- Headquarters: Baghdad, Iraq
- Key people: Laith Mohammed Hussein (Acting Director-general)
- Products: Financial Services
- Total assets: IQD 3.5 trillion (2025)
- Website: www.agbank.gov.iq/en

Agricultural Cooperative Bank of Iraq (ACB) (Arabic: المصرف الزراعي التعاوني العراقي) is an Iraqi state-owned commercial bank headquartered in Baghdad. Established in 1935, the bank operates under the administrative supervision of the Iraqi Ministry of Finance and is regulated by the Central Bank of Iraq. As of 2025, it is the second smallest of Iraq’s seven state-owned banks by assets, with total assets valued at IQD 3.5 trillion. It also operates a nationwide network of 33 branches. The bank primarily provides retail and commercial banking services, with particular emphasis on financing agricultural projects, youth initiatives, and renewable energy projects across Iraq.

== History ==
=== Establishment ===
The Agricultural Cooperative Bank of Iraq was established in 1935 as one of Iraq's first two state-owned banks, alongside with the Post Office Bank. Originally known as the Agro-Industrial Bank, its primary purpose was to finance both agricultural and industrial activities. The bank commenced operations on 1 April 1936.

In 1940, amid growing demand for agricultural, commercial and industrial credit, the Iraqi government separated the institution's agricultural and industrial financing functions, establishing a separate Agricultural Bank as well as an Industrial Bank. The Industrial Bank of Iraq began operating independently in 1946, while the Agricultural Bank subsequently focused on financing the agricultural sector. In 1956, the Agricultural Bank was renamed the Agricultural Cooperative Bank.

=== Since 1958 ===
Under the First Republic of Iraq, the government of Abdul-Karim Qasim enacted the Agrarian Reform Law of 1958, which sought to break up large feudal estates and redistribute excess agricultural land to peasants. Agricultural cooperatives were established to enable the resulting small farms to achieve economies of scale, while the bank provided farmers with access to credit and technical assistance. During the Ba'athist period, rising oil revenues enabled the government to make subsidised agricultural credits widely available through the ACB as part of efforts to increase domestic food production and food security. Farmers were encouraged to invest their savings with the bank, providing additional funds for lending to the agricultural sector. The ACB consequently underwent considerable expansion during this period.

Following the Iraqi invasion of Kuwait in 1990, the bank's activities were disrupted as the government attempted to improve food scarcity by providing loans to farmers directly at almost no interest. By 1994, the ACB was forced to suspend its lending activities. On 6 October 1996, Iraq's specialised banks were allowed to conduct commercial banking activities in addition to their statutory functions. The ACB subsequently expanded beyond specialised agricultural lending into general banking services.

=== Today ===
After the 2003 invasion of Iraq, the government of Nouri al-Maliki introduced the Prime Minister’s Initiative, a zero interest agricultural lending programme administrated by the ACB. In the subsequent years, the volume of loans issued by the ACB fluctuated, while non-performing agricultural loans to farmers increased, reaching approximately IQD 186 billion in 2022. The high level of non-performing loans was attributed to limited repayment capacity among borrowers and weaknesses in the bank's monitoring and follow up of outstanding loans.

In 2025, the Iraqi government appointed Ernst & Young to oversee the restructuring of six of the country's seven state-owned banks, including the ACB. The following year, the Iraqi Ministry of Finance proposed merging the ACB with the Industrial Bank of Iraq as part of broader restructuring of the two banks' assets, liabilities, and workforce, with the aim of bringing their operations into line with international banking standards.

== See also ==
- List of banks in Iraq

== Official website ==
- Official website
