= Rasheed Bank =

Bank of Iraq

- Native name: مصرف الرشيد
- Type: State-owned
- Industry: Banking
- Founded: 1988; 38 years ago
- Headquarters: Baghdad, Iraq
- Key people: Mohammed Samir Abbas (Director-general)
- Products: Financial Services
- Total assets: IQD 21 trillion (2025)
- Website: rasheedbank.gov.iq

Rasheed Bank (Arabic: مصرف الرشيد) is an Iraqi state-owned commercial bank headquartered in Baghdad. Established in 1988, the bank operates under the administrative supervision of the Iraqi Ministry of Finance and is regulated by the Central Bank of Iraq. As of 2025, it is the second largest of Iraq’s seven state-owned banks by assets, with total assets valued at IQD 21 trillion. It also operates a nationwide network of approximately 120 branches. The bank primarily focuses on retail and commercial banking services.

== History ==
During the Ba'athist period, state-owned Rafidain Bank was Iraq's only commercial bank. In 1988, the bank was divided, with 218 of its branches transferred to form the newly established Rasheed Bank.

Following the Iraqi invasion of Kuwait in 1990, Rasheed Bank, along with four other Iraqi state-owned entities, was placed under international sanctions. This contributed to significant financial difficulties for the bank, which was unable to issue letters of credit, a standard instrument in international trade finance. On 6 December 2006, a memorandum of understanding was signed under the guidance of the World Bank, establishing a framework for the restructuring of the bank. The restructuring primarily sought to address foreign liabilities dating from the Saddam-era as part of broader efforts to resolve Iraq's sovereign debt obligations.

On 18 April 2022, sanctions against Rasheed Bank were lifted by the United Nations Security Council, allowing the bank to reenter the international financial system. In 2025, the Iraqi government appointed Ernst & Young to oversee the restructuring of six of the country's seven state-owned banks, including Rasheed Bank. The following year, the Iraqi Ministry of Finance proposed merging Rasheed Bank with Rafidain Bank as part of broader restructuring of the two banks' assets, liabilities, and workforce, with the aim of bringing their operations into line with international banking standards.

== See also ==
- List of banks in Iraq
