= Rafidain Bank =

Bank of Iraq

- Native name: مصرف الرافدين
- Company type: Government-owned corporation
- Industry: Financial services
- Founded: 1941; 85 years ago
- Headquarters: Baghdad, Iraq
- Products: Banking services
- Website: www.rafidain-bank.gov.iq

Rafidain Bank (Arabic: مصرف الرافدين, lit. 'Bank of Mesopotamia') is an Iraqi bank headquartered in Baghdad, with 146 branches inside Iraq as well as branches in London, Cairo, Beirut, Abu Dhabi, Bahrain, Amman and Jabal Amman.

Its headquarter is in central Baghdad. As of 2017, Rafidain Bank was the largest bank in Iraq and had around 45% of banking assets in Iraq.

== History ==
The bank was established in 1941 and became a state-owned bank in the 1960s wave of Ba'ath nationalisation. In 1988, the Rafidain's non-performing assets were carved out into the Rasheed Bank.

Before the first Gulf War, Rafidain Bank "was the Arab world's largest commercial bank with total assets of USD 47 billion."

The Bank was badly damaged by the first Gulf War and the economic sanctions against Iraq. These sanctions were behind the closure of Rafidain's London Branch in 1990. During the second Gulf War, the bank was again badly hit. It is estimated that around a third of Rafidain's branches were destroyed during the second Gulf War and that the bank lost around $300m USD through looting.

In 2007, Bayan Jabor, the Iraqi Minister of Finance, signed a contract with British companies B-Plan Information Systems and Misys to rebuild the bank, in a turnkey contract to supply a core banking system, hardware, communications systems, and training to Rafidain Staff, across all branches inside and outside Iraq. The project covered basic retail banking and trade finance. Advanced banking functions such as ATM networks, credit card management and internet banking were considered by the Ministry of Finance in later stages.

== See also ==
- Iraqi dinar
