= H-1 Air Base =

- Al-Anbar Province, Iraq
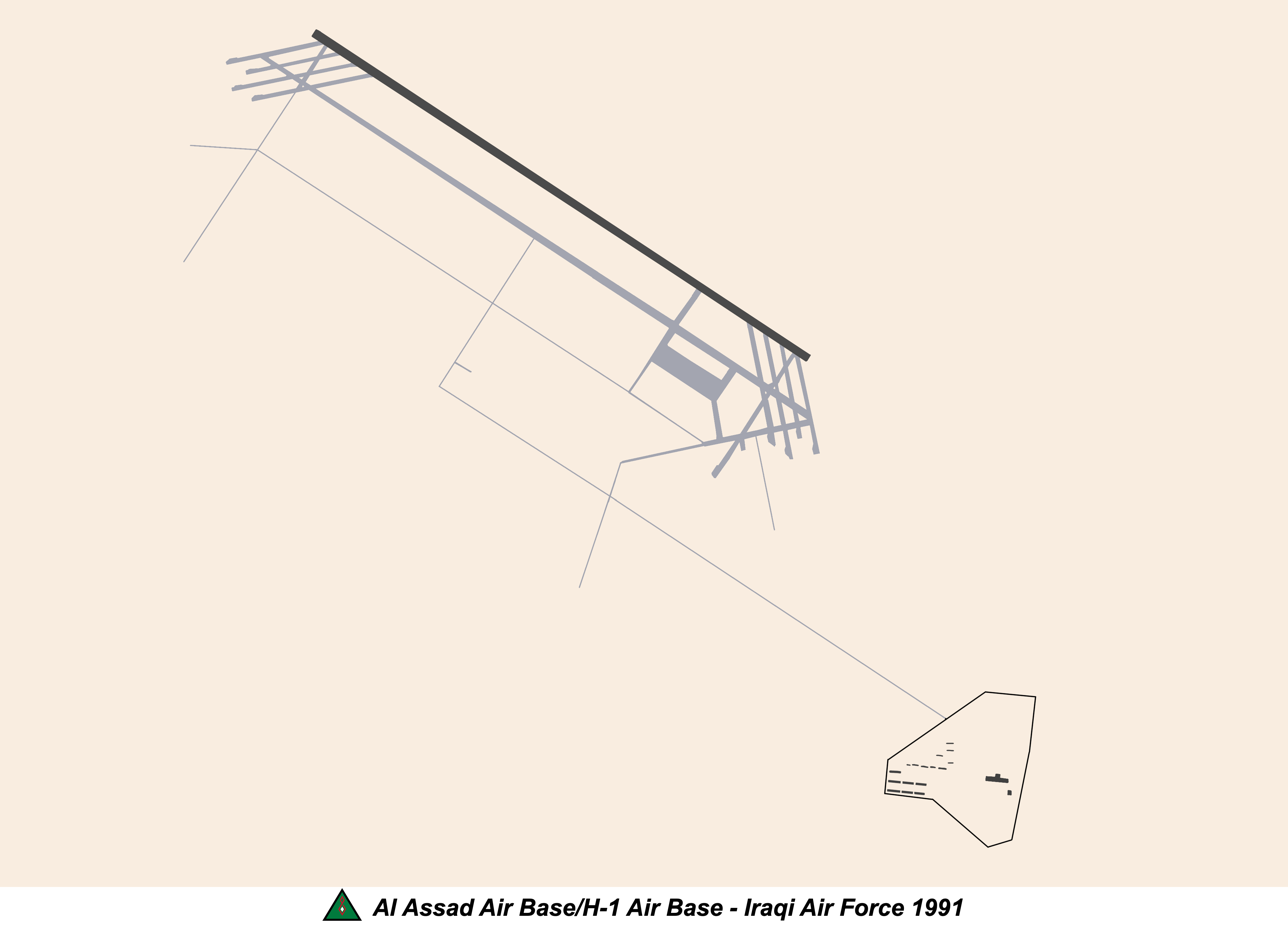

Site information
- Condition: Abandoned

Location
- Location of H-1 Air Base
- Coordinates: 33°48′51″N 41°26′07″E

Site history
- Built: 1935
- In use: 1935-2003
- Battles/wars: World War II; Operation Desert Storm; Operation Iraqi Freedom

Garrison information
- Garrison: Royal Air Force (1935-1958); Iraqi Air Force (1958-2003); Coalition Forces (2003)

Airfield information
Runways
Direction	Length and surface
11/29	undetermined (closed) Concrete

H-1 Air Base (code-named 202A) is a former Iraqi Air Force base in the Al-Anbar Governorate of Iraq. It was captured by U.S.-led Coalition forces during Operation Iraqi Freedom in 2003. Since then it has remained abandoned.

== History ==
=== RAF H1 ===
H-1 was established by the Royal Air Force as a landing ground as "RAF H1" in the 1930s. It was named for the nearby H1 pumping station on the Mosul–Haifa oil pipeline. H1 one of several airfields established as part of the British Mandate of Iraq. Iraq was created at the close of World War I from the former Ottoman Empire as part of the 1919 Treaty of Versailles. It was used until the 1940s by No. 84 Squadron RAF.

During the early days World War II, the airfield was abandoned as the RAF moved its units to RAF Habbaniya during the 1941 Iraqi coup d'état and subsequent Anglo-Iraqi War. It may have been used by some German Luftwaffe units that had moved in from Vichy French controlled Syria, during an attempted coups by German-leaning Iraqi Generals who had engineered a coup in Iraq on 31 March 1941. However, the British moved in both land reinforcements from British Palestine and flew in some Vickers Wellington and Bristol Blenheim bombers to RAF Habbaniya. The coup crumbled in disorder, with the pro-Nazi forces in Iraq surrendering on 30 May. The Luftwaffe units stranded in Iraq retreated back to Syria.

=== Iraqi Air Force ===
The airfield remained under British control until 1958 when, as a result of the 14 July 1958 Iraqi Revolution when Hashemite monarchy established by King Faisal I of Iraq in 1921 under the auspices of the British was overthrown. Subsequently, it was turned over to the Iraqi Air Force. During the 1970s, it was one of several Iraqi airfields upgraded under project "Super-Base" in response to the experiences from Arab-Israeli wars in 1967 and 1973.

The Iraqi 2nd Air Defence Sector, also known as the Western Air Defence Sector, had an IOCs at H-1 Airfield.

=== 2003 Iraq War ===
The H-1, H-2 and H-3 airfields in Western Iraq were used as operating hubs for Iraqi mobile Scud units deployed to bombard Israel during the 1991 Gulf War. Securing the area was seen to be vital to deny Iraq the opportunity to launch WMD-loaded Scuds into Israel once the invasion began, while also permitting coalition control of road traffic to and from Syria and Jordan.

On 28 March 2003 A Company, 3rd Battalion, 75th Ranger Regiment, reinforced with engineers and USAF combat controllers, was loaded onto a Boeing C-17 transport aircraft and jumped onto H1 Airfield ("Objective Serpent"), the northernmost of the Iraqi airfields. Just ten days after operations began, Combined Joint Special Operations Task Force - West (CJSOTF-W), based upon the 5th Special Forces Group, had captured the western third of Iraq. American Colonel John Mulholland, the task force commander, then quickly moved the headquarters of CJSOTF-W to H1 Airfield and began to consider new targets for his command. The British Special Air Service (SAS) and a squadron of Australian Special Air Service Regiment (SASR) had seized the nearby Iraqi H-2 and H-3 Air Bases on 21 March. By 29 March, an area some 170 miles east of the Jordanian border was blocked off from Iraqi forces, with the captured air bases serving as forward special operations bases.

In the first weeks of the war there were reports of heavy fighting involving the SAS, SASR and the U.S. Army Special Forces versus Iraqi Special Republican Guard and Special Security Services around a nuclear development site near Qaim on the Syrian border. This and other similar reports suggest that one of the key targets of the special forces were suspected Weapon of mass destruction (WMD) production and storage sites.

In early 2003, it was reported that the United States was planning to develop H-1 as a permanent base in Iraq. Those plans never materialised and today current aerial imagery shows that the operational structures around the airfield appear to have been demolished and removed. Today the concrete runway and series of taxiways remain exposed and deteriorating to the elements, being reclaimed by the Iraqi desert.
