= Special Boat Service =

Special forces unit of the Royal Navy

- Cap badge of the Special Boat Service
- Active: 1940–present
- Country: United Kingdom
- Branch: Royal Navy
- Type: Special forces
- Role: Special operations Counter-terrorism
- Size: One regiment
- Part of: United Kingdom Special Forces
- Garrison/HQ: RM Poole, Dorset, England
- Mottos: "By Strength and Guile"
- Engagements: Second World War; Palestine Emergency; Korean War; Cyprus Emergency; Indonesian Confrontation; Operation Claret; Falklands War; Operation Paraquet; Cortley Ridge raid; Gulf War; 1999 East Timorese crisis; International Force East Timor; Sierra Leone Civil War; Operation Barras; The Troubles; War on terror; War in Afghanistan; Iraq War; Boko Haram insurgency; Military intervention against ISIL; Operation Shader; First Libyan Civil War; Operation Ellamy

The Special Boat Service (SBS) is the special forces unit of the United Kingdom's Royal Navy. The SBS can trace its origins back to the Second World War when the Army Special Boat Section was formed in 1940. After the Second World War, the Royal Navy formed special forces with several name changes—Special Boat Company was adopted in 1951 and re-designated as the Special Boat Squadron in 1974—until on 28 July 1987 when the unit was renamed as the Special Boat Service after assuming responsibility for maritime counter-terrorism. Most of the operations conducted by the SBS are highly classified, and are rarely commented on by the British government or the Ministry of Defence, owing to their sensitive nature.

The Special Boat Service is the naval special forces unit of the United Kingdom Special Forces and is described as the sister unit of the British Army's Special Air Service (SAS), with both under the operational control of the Director Special Forces. In October 2001, full command of the SBS was transferred from the Commandant General Royal Marines to the Commander-in-Chief Fleet. On 18 November 2003, the SBS were given their own cap badge with the motto "By Strength and Guile". SBS soldiers are mostly recruited from the Royal Marines Commandos.

== Role ==
The principal roles of the SBS are Surveillance and Reconnaissance (SR), including information reporting and target acquisition; Offensive Action (OA), including the direction of air strikes, artillery and naval gunfire, designation for precision guided munitions, use of integral weapons and demolitions; and Support and Influence (SI), including overseas training tasks. The SBS also provides immediate response Military Counter Terrorism (CT) and Maritime Counter Terrorism (MCT) teams.

The operational capabilities of the SBS and the SAS are broadly similar. However, the SBS (being the principal Royal Navy contribution to UKSF) has the additional training and equipment required to lead in the maritime, amphibious and riverine environments. Both units come under the operational command of HQ Directorate of Special Forces (DSF) and undergo an identical selection process.

== History ==
=== Origin: Second World War ===
Roger Courtney became a commando in mid-1940 and was sent to the Combined Training Centre at Achnacarry in Scotland. He was unsuccessful in his initial attempts to convince Admiral of the Fleet Sir Roger Keyes and later Admiral Theodore Hallett, commander of the Combined Training Centre, that his idea of a folding kayak brigade would be effective. He decided to infiltrate HMS Glengyle, an infantry landing ship anchored in the River Clyde. Courtney paddled to the ship, climbed aboard undetected, wrote his initials on the door to the captain's cabin, and stole a deck gun cover. He presented the soaking cover to a group of high-ranking Royal Navy officers meeting at a nearby Inveraray hotel. He was promoted to captain and given command of twelve men as the first Special Boat Service/Special Boat Section.

The unit, on the shores of Sannox, Isle of Arran, was initially named the Folboat Troop, after the type of folding canoe employed in raiding operations and then renamed No. 1 Special Boat Section in early 1941. One training exercise required SBS members to navigate folboats 140 miles (230 km) over three days and three nights from Ardrossan to Clachan, via the Isle of Kerrera, where they reconnoitred and sketched RAF Oban. Attached to Layforce, it moved to the Middle East. The unit worked with the 1st Submarine Flotilla based at Alexandria and did beach reconnaissance of Rhodes, evacuated troops left behind on Crete, and carried out a number of small-scale raids and other operations. In December 1941 Courtney returned to the United Kingdom where he formed No2 SBS, and No1 SBS became attached to the Special Air Service (SAS) as the Folboat Section. In June 1942 they took part in the Crete airfield raids. In September 1942 eight men of the SBS carried out Operation Anglo, a raid on two airfields on the island of Rhodes; all but two of the men were captured after carrying out their mission. Destroying three aircraft, a fuel dump and numerous buildings, the two uncaptured SBS men had to hide in the countryside for four days before they could reach the waiting submarine. After the Rhodes raid, the SBS was absorbed into the SAS due to the heavy casualties they had suffered. (Note: The events of the raid were portrayed in the movie They Who Dare in 1954 starring Dirk Bogarde)

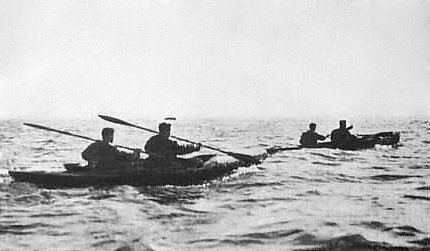
Cockles MK II

The Royal Marines Boom Patrol Detachment (RMBPD) was formed on 6 July 1942, and based at Southsea, Portsmouth. The RMBPD was under the command of Royal Marines Major Herbert 'Blondie' Hasler with Captain J. D. Stewart as second in command. The detachment consisted of 34 men and was based at Lumps Fort, and often exercised in the Portsmouth Harbour and patrolled the harbour boom at nights.

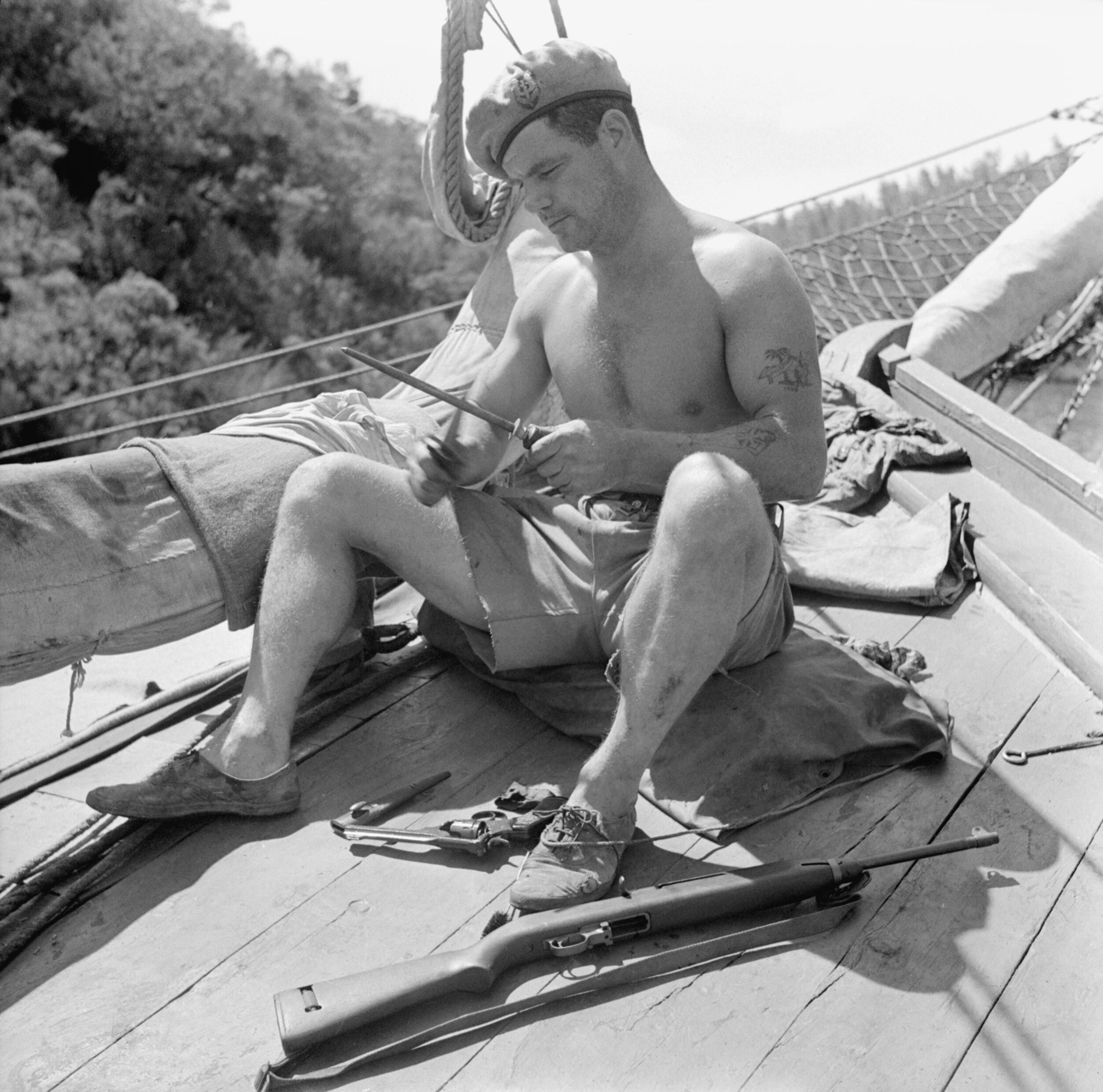
A Special Boat Service corporal sharpening his knife before combat on a boat in the Aegean Sea, July 1944

In April 1943, 1st SAS was divided, with 250 men from the SAS joining the Small Scale Raiding Force to form the Special Boat Squadron under the command of Major the Earl Jellicoe. They moved to Haifa and trained with the Greek Sacred Regiment for operations in the Aegean.

They later operated among the Dodecanese and Cyclades groups of islands in the Dodecanese Campaign and took part in the Battle of Leros and the Battle of Kos. They, with the Greek Sacred Band, took part in the successful Raid on Symi in July 1944 in which the entire German garrison was either killed or captured. In August 1944 they joined with the Long Range Desert Group in operations in the Adriatic, on the Peloponnese, in Albania, and, finally, in Istria. So effective were they that, by 1944, the 200–300 men of the SBS were holding down six German divisions.

Throughout the war, No.2 SBS did not use the Special Boat Squadron name but instead retained the name Special Boat Section. They accompanied US Major General Mark Clark ashore before the Operation Torch landings in October 1942 on Operation Flagpole. Later, one group, Z SBS, which was based in Algiers from March 1943, carried out the beach reconnaissance for the Salerno landings and a raid on Crete, before moving to Ceylon to work with the Special Operations Executives, Force 136 and later with Special Operations Australia. The rest of No. 2 SBS became part of South-East Asia Command's Small Operations Group, operating on the Chindwin and Irrawaddy rivers, and in the Arakan, during the Burma campaign.

Although their roles always overlapped to some extent, the various canoe and boat units became more specialised from late 1942 onwards. The RMBPD focused on ship attack and harbour sabotage, the Special Boat Section and Combined Operations Pilotage Parties (COPP) undertook covert beach surveys, and the Special Boat Squadron engaged in raiding, sabotage and reconnaissance above the high-water mark.

=== Post-war era ===
In 1946, the SBS, whether of Commando or SAS parentage, was disbanded. The RMBPD was the only British Special Forces unit to survive the end of World War II intact, and one of three Special Service units to survive (the other two being the RM Commandos and the Parachute Regiment). In 1946, the RMBPD became the School of Combined Operations Beach and Boat Section (SCOBBS) at Fremington, Devon. Lt-Col "Blondie" Hasler RM became the adviser to SCOBBS and wrote the pamphlet "General Notes on the Use of Special Parties". The basic SCOBBS course of fourteen weeks covered the range of skills of the wartime COPPS, SRU, SBS and Detachment 385. In October 1947 SCOBBS dropped the word School from its name and moved to RM Eastney to become the Small Raids Wing (SRW) of the Amphibious School, Royal Marines. The school's Chief Instructor Norman Tailyour established the Royal Marines Special Boat Sections taking on the roles proposed in Hasler's paper. Their first missions were in Palestine, involving ordnance removal, and limpet mine removal from ships in Haifa. The SBS went on to serve in the Korean War, deployed on operations along the North Korean coast, as well as operating behind enemy lines destroying lines of communication, installations and gathering intelligence. During the Korean War the SBS operated from submarines like their wartime predecessors.

In the early 1950s, NATO doctrine for the defence of Western Europe called for a rapid fall-back to the west bank of the Rhine River, a natural defensive barrier. Royal Navy Rhine Flotilla's SBS detachment had the task of demolishing the bridges over the river as well as destroying the many river barges on the river. The SBS teams of a radio operator and two SBS swimmer-canoeists would then stay behind on the eastern side of the river providing reconnaissance and intelligence and to sabotage Warsaw Pact forces logistics. 2 SB Section, and later also the newly formed 3 SB Section, were part of the Rhine Squadron until around 1958 and took part in all major British Army of the Rhine (BAOR) exercises when they would be joined by 4 and 5 SB Section, formed from the Royal Marines Reserve.

In 1952, SBS teams were held at combat readiness in Egypt in case Gamal Abdel Nasser's revolution turned more violent than it did. The SBS were also allegedly operating in Cyprus during the emergency and on alert during the Suez Crisis of 1956 and coup against King Idris I of Libya (1959), but in the cases of Egypt and Libya, not seeing action. In 1961, SBS teams carried out reconnaissance missions during the Indonesian Confrontation (see Operation Claret). In the same year, Iraq threatened to invade Kuwait for the first time, and the SBS put a detachment at Bahrain. In 1972, the SBS came into prominence when members of a combined SBS and RAOC team parachuted into the Atlantic Ocean after a bomb threat on board the cruise liner Queen Elizabeth 2. A thorough search of the ship found no evidence of any device drawing the conclusion that it was a hoax. The SBS conducted operations in Northern Ireland during The Troubles including with submarines. In January 1975, two SBS kayak teams were inserted from HMS Cachalot to conduct an anti-gun-running operation in the area between Torr Head and Garron.

=== Special Boat Squadron ===
In 1973, their name was changed to the Special Boat Squadron and in 1980 the SBS relinquished North Sea oil rig protection to Comacchio Company, Royal Marines. In 1982, after the Argentinian invasion of the Falkland Islands, they deployed to South Georgia in Operation Paraquet, where they reconnoitred Argentinian positions before participating in the recapture of Grytviken. Other SBS units went ashore on East Falkland at San Carlos for reconnaissance of the landing beaches before the Operation Sutton landings and persuaded a nearby Argentinian unit to surrender. The only losses to the SBS during the Falklands War occurred when the SBS and SAS were operating behind the lines and two members of the SBS were shot, one fatally, by an SAS patrol, who had mistaken them for Argentinians.

=== Special Boat Service ===
In 1987, they were renamed Special Boat Service, and became part of the United Kingdom Special Forces Group alongside the Special Air Service and 14 Intelligence Company. In the Gulf War, there was no amphibious role assigned to the SBS. An "area of operations line" was drawn down the middle of Iraq; the SAS would operate west of the line and the SBS to the east. As well as searching for mobile Scud missile launchers, the SBS's assigned area contained a mass of fibre-optic cable that provided Iraq with intelligence; the location of the main junction of the network was 32 miles from Baghdad. On 22 January 1991, 36 SBS members were inserted by two Chinook helicopters from No. 7 Squadron RAF into an area full of Iraqi ground and air forces as well as spies and nomads. The SBS team managed to avoid these and destroyed a 40-yard section of the cable with explosives, neutralising what was left of the Iraqi communication grid. The SBS also carried out one of its most high-profile operations when it liberated the British Embassy in Kuwait, abseiling from helicopters hovering above the embassy. They also carried out diversionary raids along the Kuwaiti coast which diverted a number of Iraqi troops away from the main thrust of the coalition buildup, to the SBS area of operations.

In September 1999, about 20 SBS members contributed to the Australian-led International Force for East Timor (INTERFET) in East Timor. Together with the Australian Special Air Service Regiment and the New Zealand Special Air Service they formed INTERFET's special forces element, named Response Force. Response Force departed from Darwin by C-130 Hercules transport aircraft and flew into Dili tasked with securing the airport, a seaport and a heli-port to enable regular forces to land and deploy. The SBS were filmed driving a Land Rover Defender out of a Hercules. Response Force was then used to perform a variety of tasks including direct action and special reconnaissance throughout East Timor. The British forces, including the SBS, withdrew in December 1999. Sergeant Mark Andrew Cox was awarded the Military Cross after his patrol came under fire from pro-Indonesian militia.

=== 21st century ===
==== Sierra Leone ====
In September 2000, the SBS, integrated with the SAS, were involved in Operation Barras, a hostage rescue operation in Sierra Leone that successfully rescued six captured Royal Irish Regiment soldiers.

==== Afghanistan ====
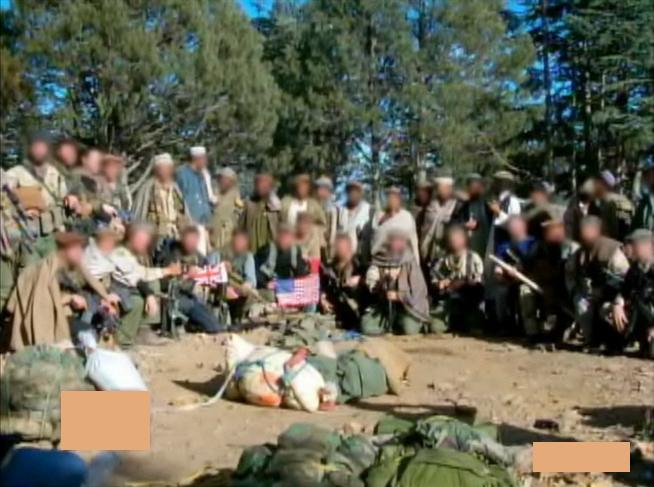
SBS with U.S. Delta Force at the Battle of Tora Bora

In November 2001, C and M squadron SBS had an extensive role in the invasion of Afghanistan at the start of the War in Afghanistan. Notably, members of M squadron, alongside members of SIS, were involved in the Battle of Tora Bora. The SBS was integrated directly into Task Force Sword – a Black unit, under direct command of JSOC, this was a so-called hunter-killer force whose primary objective was capturing or killing senior leadership and high-value targets within al-Qaeda and the Taliban. Troops from C squadron (reinforced by teams from X and Z squadron, with at least one SEAL attached to them) were tasked with several missions, some with Abdul Rashid Dostum's Northern Alliance forces at Mazar-e-Sharif. On 10 November, C squadron inserted into the recently captured Bagram Airbase, causing a dispute with the Northern Alliance leadership, which claimed that the British had failed to consult them on it before the deployment. In addition to fighting with Dostum's forces, they worked alongside TF Sword in Shah-i-Kot Valley. Members of M squadron SBS were involved in a prison revolt during the Battle of Qala-i-Jangi. Members of the SBS along with US and Northern Alliance troops eventually quelled the uprising, but during one close air support mission, a misdirected JDAM bomb wounded four SBS personnel to various degrees. In appreciation for the SBS's contribution to the battle, the CIA attempted to recognise the personnel with US decorations, but due to military and political bureaucracy, the decorations were never awarded. The SBS continued to work with Task Force Sword and the CIA.

In Spring 2005, the Director of Special Forces re-balanced British special forces deployments so that Afghanistan would be the responsibility of the SBS and Iraq would be the 22 SAS Regiment's. In Spring 2006, the British military deployed over 4,000 troops to southern Afghanistan and the SBS were assigned to take the lead in supporting the deployment. The SBS were part of Task Force 42 the British contingent in the Joint Special Forces command; their deployment with other British special forces units was codenamed Operation Kindle (similar to the SAS and other British SF deployment in Iraq, known as Operation Crichton); the SBS carried out missions all over southern Afghanistan with AgustaWestland Apache helicopters. Along with training and mentoring Afghan Provincial Response Companies, Afghan police tactical units the operated jointly with Coalition SOF, TF 42 conducted operations in direct support of the British Battle Group deployed in Helmand Province and for ISAF SOF Command and operations directly for the Americans in pursuit of high-value targets. The main objective of the SBS (and later on other British special forces units with Afghan forces) was targeting Taliban leaders and drug barons using "Carrot and stick" tactics. On 27 June 2006, a 16-man unit from C Squadron and members of the Special Reconnaissance Regiment (SRR) carried out Operation Ilois: an operation that silently captured four Taliban leaders in compounds on the outskirts of Sangin, Helmand province. As they returned to their Land Rover vehicles, they were ambushed by an estimated 60–70 Taliban insurgents, with one vehicle disabled by RPG fire, the team took cover in an irrigation ditch and requested assistance while holding off the Taliban force. The Helmand Battle Group had not been informed of the operation until it went wrong; a Quick Reaction Force (QRF) made up of a platoon of Gurkhas responded but ran into another insurgent ambush; one SBS member was seriously injured in the ambush. After an hour-long gunfight (some sources say three hours), Apache attack helicopters, the Gurkha QRF and the 16-man unit, supported by a US A-10 Thunderbolt and two Harrier GR7s managed to break contact and return to the closest FOB; two of the four Taliban leaders were killed in the firefight while the other two escaped in the chaos. Upon reaching the FOB it was discovered that Captain David Patton, SRR, and Sergeant Paul Bartlett, SBS were missing—one was helping wounded out of a vehicle when he was shot and assumed killed, and the other went missing during the firefight. An RAF Chinook carrying a company from the Parachute Regiment took off to find them, a pair of Apaches spotted the bodies and the Paras recovered them. One SBS member was awarded the MC for his actions in the ambush.

On 12 May 2007, an SBS team killed the Taliban leader Mullah Dadullah after JSOC and the ISA tracked him to a compound—where his associates were meeting—near Bahram Chah, Helmand province. The ISA confirmed he was there and an SBS reconnaissance element carried out reconnaissance of the compound which showed that Dadullah was protected by 20 insurgents. That night, with the ISA monitoring the target, the majority of C Squadron were inserted by RAF Chinook HC.2 helicopters while Apache helicopters provided cover. The troops stormed the compound and an hour long firefight took place as small groups of Taliban were hunted down and killed. Four SBS personnel were wounded (one seriously). Eventually Dadullah was shot in the chest and head, a brief site exploitation was conducted and the assault force was picked up by helicopter. On 29 July 2007, members of the SBS were carrying out a special mission in Nimruz when they were involved in a firefight with Taliban insurgents, Lance Corporal Michael Jones was killed and three other members were wounded. On 24 September 2007, members of C squadron SBS and the Italian SOF unit Col Moschin rescued two Italian intelligence agents who were kidnapped two days before by the Taliban in Herat province near Farah. Col Moschin parachuted onto a drop zone and marched overnight to surround the target compound, while the SBS were standing by in Lynx and Chinook helicopters to provide cut off groups in case the insurgents attempted to escape. A US Predator drone also supported the British and Italians. The insurgents brought the hostages out of the compound and loaded them into vehicles before the Italians were in position to rescue them, but the SBS closed in on the vehicles: aerial snipers using M82A1 anti-materiel rifles forced the vehicles to stop. A Chinook dropped off more than a dozen SBS personnel who engaged the Taliban who were disembarking the vehicles. Eight Taliban insurgents were killed and the hostages were rescued, although one died of gunshot wounds.

On 18 February 2008, Taliban leader Mullah Abdul Matin and one of his sub-commanders, Mullah Karim Agha, along with several bodyguards were travelling through the desert near Gereshk, Helmand province on motorbikes when they were ambushed and killed by an SBS unit dropped into his path by helicopter. In February 2009, members of the SBS took part in Operation Diesel, which resulted in the seizure of £50 million of heroin and the killing of at least 20 Taliban insurgents. On 29 August 2009, Sergeant Lee Houltram of the SBS was killed by an IED during a Special Forces operation to destroy a bomb factory near Gereshk in Helmand province. On 9 September 2009, an SBS team supported by the Special Forces Support Group (SFSG) rescued Times journalist Stephen Farrell from a Taliban safe house in Char Dara District, Kunduz Province after he and his Afghan interpreter had been captured by the Taliban while reporting on the Kunduz airstrike. The British special forces were forced to act when intercepted communications of the Taliban leader showed them discussing moving the hostages into Pakistan. They were inserted before dawn by 160th SOAR helicopters directly onto the target building. While the SFSG set up a cordon, the Afghan interpreter was accidentally shot and killed, and two civilians were killed by an explosive breaching charge on the compound. Although an SFSG soldier was killed, Farrell was successfully rescued. On 1 July 2010 during an operation against insurgents in Haji Wakil, Helmand Province, Corporal Seth Stephens of the SBS was killed during a heavy firefight while clearing a compound, as a result of his actions during that operation, he was awarded the Conspicuous Gallantry Cross.

On 15 April 2012, during the Taliban attack on Kabul, SBS members cleared Taliban militants from a central location overlooking foreign embassies. A heavily armed insurgent suicide squad occupied a six-storey, half-built tower block, and began firing small arms and RPGs on nearby buildings including the British and German embassies. SBS and Afghan troops fought a close quarters battle for eight-and-a-half hours to eventually clear the militants from the structure. The mission to end the siege is thought to have been one of the most decorated actions of Britain's involvement in Afghanistan, with several gallantry awards given to the participants. A combat assault dog, a Belgian Malinois known as Mali, received the Dickin Medal for his actions during the battle. Despite being badly injured by grenade shrapnel, Mali stayed by the side of his handler and continued to find safe routes for the British and Afghan troops as they fought their way up the tower floor-by-floor, preventing the operators from suffering major casualties. On 23 December 2013, Captain Richard Holloway was serving with the SBS when he was killed by Taliban small arms fire while conducting an operation to suppress the Taliban in a joint SBS-Afghan forces raid (with air support) on Taliban insurgents in a valley east of Kabul ahead of the Afghanistan elections.

==== Iraq ====
In the 2003 invasion of Iraq, M Squadron deployed to Jordan as Task Force 7, which was part of Combined Joint Special Operations Task Force - West (CJSOTF-West) and were earmarked for a heliborne assault on several Iraqi oil facilities that had their own desert airstrips that once captured would be used for special operations forces' staging areas. In northern Iraq in early March, a small reconnaissance team from M Squadron mounted on Honda All-terrain vehicles inserted into Iraq from Jordan, its first mission was to conduct reconnaissance of an Iraqi air base at al-Sahara. The team was compromised by an anti-special forces Fedayeen unit and barely escaped thanks to a US McDonnell Douglas F-15E Strike Eagle that flew air cover for the team and the bravery of an RAF Chinook that extracted the team under the Fedayeen's 'noses'.

M Squadron launched a second operation at full strength ("Zero Six Bravo") in a mix of land rovers and ATVs into northern Iraq from H-2 Air Base, the objective was to locate, make contact and take the surrender of the Iraqi 5th Army Corps somewhere past Tikrit and to survey and mark viable temporary landing zones for follow-on forces. However the Squadron was compromised by a goat herder; the SBS drove for several days while unknown to them anti-special forces Fedayeen units followed them. At an overnight position near Mosul the Fedayeen ambushed the Squadron with DShK heavy machine guns and RPGs, the SBS returned fire and began taking fire from a T-72, the Squadron scattered and escaped the well-constructed trap. A number of Land Rovers became bogged down in a nearby wadi, so the troops mined the vehicles and abandoned them—though several did not detonate and were captured and exhibited on Iraqi television. The SBS was now in three distinct groups: one with several operational Land Rovers was being pursued by the Iraqi hunter force, a second mainly equipped with ATVs was hunkered down and trying to arrange extraction, the third with just 2 personnel on an ATV raced for the Syrian border. The first group tried to call in coalition strike aircraft but the aircraft could not identify friendly forces because the SBS were not equipped with infra-red strobes—although their vehicles did have Blue Force Tracker units, they eventually made it to an emergency rendezvous point and were extracted by an RAF Chinook. The second group was also extracted by an RAF Chinook and the third group made it to Syria and was held there until their release was negotiated, there were no SBS casualties.

M Squadron also had a 3-month tour in early 2003. Corporal Ian Plank, an SBS member attached to the SAS was killed by Iraqi insurgents during a house-to-house search for a wanted high-ranking Islamist terrorist in an insurgent compound in Ramadi on 31 October 2003, he was the first UKSF combat casualty of the Iraq War. The SBS was also very active as part of Task Force Black, C squadron deployed to Baghdad as part of the task force in 2004, in its four-month deployment it mounted 22 raids. On 23 July 2005, M squadron, supported by troops from the SAS and US forces carried out Operation Marlborough, killing three members of AQI.

==== Libya ====
On 27 February 2011, during the First Libyan Civil War, the BBC reported that C Squadron assisted in the evacuation of 150 oil workers in three flights by RAF C-130 Hercules from an airfield near Zella to Valletta in Malta.

==== Nigeria ====
On 8 March 2012, a small SBS team attempted to rescue two hostages, Chris McManus (British) and Franco Lamolinara (Italian), who were being held in Nigeria by members of the Boko Haram terrorist organisation that was loyal to al-Qaeda. The two hostages were killed by their captors before or during the rescue attempt. All the hostage takers were reportedly killed.

==== United Kingdom ====
On 21 December 2018, SBS personnel resolved a situation by storming the container ship Grande Tema where four stowaways hijacked the ship, demanding to enter the UK.

On 25 October 2020, SBS personnel stormed the oil tanker Nave Andromeda south-east of the Isle of Wight. The vessel was suspected to have been hijacked by seven Nigerian stowaways seeking asylum in Britain, who were later handed over to Hampshire Police.

== Organisation ==
The Ministry of Defence does not comment on special forces matters, and there is consequently little verifiable information in the public domain. The SBS is under the Operational Command of Director Special Forces and is based in Hamworthy barracks, Poole, Dorset.

According to military sources in 2020, the SBS numbers about a couple of hundred personnel. Members are on standby at all times. While women have been eligible to join since 2018, there is no official information on women serving on the frontline.

In 1987, when renamed the Special Boat Service, the SBS was also reformed along SAS lines, with 16-person troops (each equivalent to a platoon) instead of the traditional sections. About 200–250 commandos make up the SBS at any one time, and once qualified, personnel are known as "Swimmer Canoeists". They are experts in swimming, diving, parachuting, navigation, demolition and reconnaissance.

Since the SBS joined the UKSF Group in the 1980s, it has been restructured. Previously, each squadron was tasked with a permanent specialist role. The unit has since adopted the same system of each squadron rotating through the unit's different roles used in the SAS. Each Squadron rotates through counter terrorism duties and conventional operations and tasking. For example, in December 2001 C squadron was on MCT Role, and was called in to intercept the MV Nisha while M and Z Squadron were deployed in Afghanistan.

The SBS Reserve (SBS(R)) provides individual reservists to augment the regular SBS. Recruits need to be serving members of UK reserve forces and a high level of commitment is required. The SBS(R) is based at various locations throughout the United Kingdom, but training is carried out in the South of England.

=== Structure ===
The structure of the SBS is as follows:

- C Squadron
- M Squadron
  - HQ Troop, 4 Troop, 5 Troop, 6 Troop
- X Squadron
- Z Squadron
- SBS(Reserve) R Squadron

The SBS has a subunit dedicated to operating Swimmer Delivery Vehicles (SDVs) known as the SDV Troop.

=== Commanding Officers ===
- 1943 George Jellicoe, 2nd Earl Jellicoe
- 1952 Hugh Bruce
- 1970s Rupert Van der Horst
- 2002 Ed Davis
- 2003 Richard Van der Horst
- 2009 Gwyn Jenkins

== Equipment ==
In 2019, the SDV Troop operated three Mk8 Mod 1 SDVs, with an order to replace them with three new Mk11 SWCS SDVs. An SDV can be housed in an Astute-class submarine's dry deck shelter. SBS members are provided with assistance by Fleet Diving Group divers when using dry deck shelters.

Fast Insertion/Interceptor Craft (FIC) are also in use with the SBS. They have a reported maximum speed of up to 55 knots and the hull features a highly stealthy design and advanced 'wave piercing' qualities. They are similar to the American Mark V Special Operations Craft. The SBS use Klepper Aerius folding canoes, Rigid Raiders, Avon Searider Rigid Inflatable Boats (RIBs), and Dräger LAR-V rebreathers.

== Recruitment, selection and training ==
=== Pre-selection aptitude test ===
Before progressing to joint UKSF selection, SBS aspirants must pass a 2-week aptitude test, which involves the following:

- Boating phase (1 week)
  - Combat fitness test
  - SBS swimming test
    - Swim 600 metres in 15 minutes
    - Swim 50 metres clothed with a weapon and belt
    - Swim 25 metres underwater while holding your breath
  - Multiple canoe trials including:
    - Carrying a folding canoe and fully loaded bergen for 3 miles (4.8 km)
    - 20-mile (32 km) canoe paddle
- Diving phase (1 week)
  - Complete a number of dives with confidence and willingness
  - Learn and demonstrate diving drills with sufficient quality

=== UKSF selection ===
SBS candidates take part in Joint Special Forces Selection alongside SAS candidates, with their selection and training diverging after the end of the JSFS course. JSFS lasts ≈ 6 months. It is broken down into multiple phases, including cross-country marches in the aptitude phase and teaching and testing soldiering skills in the jungle phase. It also involves training in other fields, such escape and evasion and resistance to interrogation (RTI).

Originally, the SBS had its own independent end-to-end selection programme to qualify as a Swimmer Canoeist, but its selection course was integrated into the joint UKSF selection course with candidates for the SAS. In the past, the SBS was staffed almost entirely by the Royal Marines. Today, all members of His Majesty's Armed Forces can be considered for special forces selection. (Note: The regular elements of United Kingdom Special Forces never recruit directly from the general public.) Approximately 40% of all UK Special Forces are recruited from the Royal Marines.

There are two selection courses each year: one in Winter and the other in Summer. Candidates wishing to serve with the Special Boat Service must have completed at least two years regular service and are only accepted into the SBS after completion of the selection process.

==== SC3 course ====
After passing joint UKSF selection, at which point SAS aspirants have passed, SBS aspirants continue to the Swimmer Canoeist, Third Class (SC3) course, sometimes called the boating and diving course. It lasts eight weeks and covers specialist maritime skills such as canoeing, diving, boating, underwater navigation and demolition, negotiating surf zones, and submarine infiltration. The course includes a 34-mile (55 km) course in a canoe. After passing the SC3 course, SBS aspirants have passed selection as a whole and join an operational troop on probation. As SBS marines grow in experience and rank, they take the more advanced SC2 and then SC1 courses.

=== Reserve selection ===
For SBS(R) selection, only candidates with previous military experience are eligible to enlist. Training is carried out in the South of England and candidates are required to complete the following tests over the four-day initial selection course:

- Combat Fitness Test (CFT) – 12.8 km (8 mi) carrying 25 kg (55 lb) within 1 hour 50 minutes.
- Swim test – 500 m (1,600 ft) using any stroke in uniform and retrieve an object from 5 m (16 ft).
- Gym tests.
- Advanced CFT 1 – 15 km (9.3 mi) carrying 25 kg (55 lb).
- Advanced CFT 2 – 24 km (15 mi) carrying 30 kg (66 lb).

== See also ==
- British commando frogmen
- List of military special forces units
- TV Sir Tristram, UKSF training ship
- SD Northern River, Marine services vessel reportedly employed in UKSF operations
- SD Victoria, Marine services vessel reportedly employed in UKSF operations
- List of military diving units (including special forces)
- 22 Special Air Service Regiment Boat Troop

== Notes and references ==
Footnotes

Citations

== Bibliography ==
- Breuer, William B. (2001). Daring missions of World War II. John Wiley and Sons. ISBN 978-0-471-40419-4.
- Camsell, Don (2001). Black water : a life in the Special Boat Service. London: Virgin. ISBN 978-0753505120.
- Chappell, Mike (1996). Army Commandos 1940–1945. Elite Series # 64. Osprey Publishing. ISBN 1-85532-579-9.
- Corera, Gordon (2012). MI6: Life and Death in the British Secret Service. London: Phoenix. ISBN 978-0753828335.
- Farrell, John (2000). Peace Makers: INTERFETs Liberation of East Timor. Rocklea: Fullbore. ISBN 0-646-39424-X.
- Haskew, Michael E. (2007). Encyclopaedia of Elite Forces in the Second World War. Pen and Sword. ISBN 978-1-84415-577-4.
- Hennessy, Peter; Jinks, James (2015). The silent deep: The Royal Navy Submarine Service since 1945. London: Allen Lane. ISBN 978-1846145803.
- Jackson, Ashley (2006). The British Empire and the Second World War. Continuum International Publishing Group. ISBN 1-85285-417-0.
- Kennedy, Greg (2005). British Naval Strategy East of Suez, 1900–2000: Influences and Actions. Routledge. ISBN 0-7146-5539-2.
- Kiras, James D. (2024). Special Operations Success: Balancing Capabilities and Control. Oxford University Press. ISBN 978-0198902065.
- Lewis, Damien (2007). Bloody Heroes (New ed.). London: Arrow Books. ISBN 978-1448165650. OCLC 851782794.
- Lewis, Damien (2013). Zero Six Bravo : 60 special forces, 100,000 enemy, the explosive true story. London: Quercus. ISBN 9781782060826.
- Molinari, Andrea (2007). Desert Raiders: Axis and Allied Special Forces 1940–43. Osprey Publishing. ISBN 978-1-84603-006-2.
- Morgan, Mike (2000). Daggers Drawn: Second World War Heroes of the SAS and SBS. Sutton. ISBN 0-7509-2509-4.
- Neville, Leigh (2015). Special Forces in the War on Terror. General Military. Oxford: Osprey Publishing. ISBN 978-1472807908.
- Neville, Leigh (2008). Special Operations Forces in Afghanistan. Elite Series # 163. Oxford: Osprey Publishing. ISBN 978-1846033100.
- Neville, Leigh (2016). The SAS 1983–2014. Elite Series # 211. Oxford: Osprey Publishing. ISBN 978-1472814036.
- Owen, James (2012). Commando. Little, Brown. ISBN 978-1-4087-0302-1.
- Parker, John (2013) [1997]. SBS: The inside story of the Special Boat Service (Updated ed.). London: Headline. ISBN 978-1472202659.
- Rees, Quentin (2008). The Cockleshell Canoes: British Military Canoes of World War Two. Stroud, Gloucestershire: Amberley. ISBN 978-1-84868-065-4.
- Richards, Brooks (2004). Secret Flotillas: Clandestine Sea Operations in the Mediterranean, North Africa and the Adriatic, 1940–1944. Routledge. ISBN 0-7146-5314-4.
- Ryan, Chris (2009). Fight to Win. Century. ISBN 978-1-84605-666-6.
- Thompson, Leroy (1994). SAS: Great Britain's Elite Special Air Service. Zenith Imprint. ISBN 0-87938-940-0.
- Urban, Mark (2012a). Task Force Black: The Explosive True Story of the Secret Special Forces War in Iraq. St. Martin's: Griffin. ISBN 978-1250006967.
- Van der Bijl, Nick; Hannon, Paul (1995). The Royal Marines 1939–93. Elite Series # 57. London: Osprey Publishing. ISBN 1-85532-388-5.
