= CHSW =

CHSW may refer to:

- Cranston High School West, a school in Rhode Island, USA.
- Children's Hospice South West, a hospice for sick children with three sites in Somerset, Devon, and Cornwall, England.
- Construction (Health, Safety, and Welfare) Regulations 1996 – one of the Health and safety regulations in the United Kingdom
