= La Mède refinery =

Coordinates: 43.39755°N 5.10246°E

The La Mède refinery is a biorefinery that previously operated as a traditional fossil fuel refinery owned by TotalEnergies in Châteauneuf-les Martigues near Marseille, France, and on the Etang de Berre. The plant includes about 250 hectares.

The biorefinery has a capacity of 500,000 tones of biofuels (hydrotreated vegetable oil) a year. The plant conversion, started in 2015, finished in 2019 with EUR 275 million of capital expenditure. In 2021, the plant announced production of aviation biofuel made from cooking oil.

A 2018 agreement with the French government capped the amount of palm oil production at the facility at 300 000 tonnes, while requiring at least 50 000 tonnes of French-grown rapeseed oil.

Environmental activists have criticized the plant for its reliance on palm oil, which has a track record of global environmental destruction and human rights violations. Local farmers represented by Fédération nationale des syndicats d'exploitants agricoles also expressed concerns about palm oil competing with local oil production.

== History ==
The refinery was built in the early 1930s as one of two refineries (the other in Gonfreville) whose purpose was to refine a new source of Middle Eastern crude oil. The Compagnie Francaise des Petroles held a 23.75% share in the Iraq Petroleum Company, which had struck oil in Kirkuk in 1927 and in 1934 had completed a pipeline to the Mediterranean Sea.

With the Fall of France, Syria and the pipeline terminal at Tripoli were under the control of the Vichy Government, but with Iraq on the side of the Allies, oil deliveries came to a halt. With the Syria–Lebanon campaign in the summer of 1941 the Allies regained control of the entire pipeline system and with the Battle of Marseille at the end of August 1944 gained control of the refinery.

While the refineries on the Atlantic coast were destroyed or severely damaged, the three refineries near Marseille remained intact: La Mede, Etang de Berre and Lavera. The prewar capacity of 900,000 tons per year (18,750bpd) at La Mede was still available in 1945 and had risen to 1,200,000 (25,000bpd) in 1947. France as a whole had a prewar refining capacity of 8,100,000 tons per year (168,750bpd), which fell to 1,800,000tpa (37,500bpd) in 1945 and recovered by 1947 to 6,680,000tpa (140,000bpd).

In 1961 the two plants at Gonfreville (150,000bpd) and Martigues (136,000bpd) were the two largest in France (total 914,715bpd crude oil capacity).

The plant entered operation in 1935 as a crude oil and petrochemical plant. The plant stopped production of petroleum in 2016.

In 1992 the plant had a gas explosion.
