= H-3 Air Base =

Military airfield in Iraq

- Al Walid Airbase; Camp Korean Village/Camp "KV" (USMC)
- Al-Anbar Province, Iraq
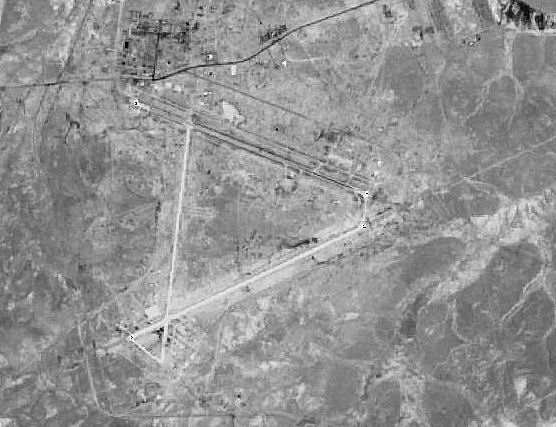
- H-3 Main Air Base, 1995

Site information
- Open to the public: No
- Condition: Abandoned

Location
- Location of H-3 Air Base
- Coordinates: 32°55′46″N 039°44′38″E

Site history
- Built: 1935
- In use: 1935 – 2003
- Battles/wars: World War II; Iran–Iraq War; Operation Desert Storm; Operation Iraqi Freedom

Airfield information
Runways
Direction	Length and surface
10/24	undetermined (closed) Concrete
11/29	undetermined (closed) Concrete

H-3 Air Base (code-named 202C, 202D) is part of a cluster of former Iraqi Air Force bases in the Al-Anbar Governorate of Iraq. H3 is located in a remote stretch of Iraq's western desert, about 435 kilometers from Baghdad in western Iraq. It is close to the Syrian–Iraqi border, and near the highway that connects Jordan with Baghdad.

H-3 Main is supported by two dispersal airfields, H-3 Southwest 32°44′48″N 039°35′59″E, and H-3 Northwest 33°04′34″N 039°35′52″E, and a Highway strip, 42 kilometers to the west 32°50′55″N 039°18′28″E. H-3 Southwest is served by a single 9,700-foot runway and has a parallel taxiway that could be used as an alternate runway. Ruwayshid Air Base was previous used as another dispersal airfield.

== History ==
H-3 airstrip was established by the Iraq Petroleum Company in 1935 as a landing ground for pumping station H3 on the Mosul–Haifa oil pipeline. The Jordanian H-4 Air Base is located at the next pumping station.

It was never a British Royal Air Force (RAF) air base although during World War II the pumping station and adjacent oil pipeline were patrolled by RAF Armoured Cars, together with RAF Iraq Levies based at H3 and RAF aircraft would have used the airstrip.

=== Iraqi Air Force ===
During the 1970s, it was one of several Iraqi airfields upgraded under project "Super-Base" in response to the experiences from Arab-Israeli wars in 1967 and 1973.

Companies from Yugoslavia – previously engaged in building bridges in Iraq – became involved in airfield construction. Due to their specific construction of these airfields – which included taxi-ways leading right out of Hardened Aircraft Shelters (HAS) and laid diagonally to the runways – they became known as "Trapezoids" or "Yugos".

The protection of each HAS consisted of one meter thick concrete shells, reinforced by 30 cm thick steel plates. There was only one entrance and this was covered by sliding doors, made of 50 cm thick steel armoured plate and concrete. The HAS' were usually built in small groups – seldom more than five, with each group sharing the same water and power supply, each HAS having its own backup gasoline-powered electrical generator, and each HAS being equipped with a semi-automatic aircraft-refueling system.

=== Iran–Iraq War ===
During the winter of 1980–1981, Iraqi Air Force kept back its military airplanes in H-3 base to protect them from Iranian Air Force attacks. So the Iranian Air Force devised an operation to bomb the air base. On 4 April 1981, eight IRIAF F-4 Phantoms flew their boldest interdiction strike of the war, penetrating over 1,000 km into Iraq in order to attack all three airfields of the H-3 complex.

Achieving complete surprise, the Iranians made several passes against Al-Walid, H-3 Northwest and H-3 Southwest ABs, destroying three AN-12s, one Tu-16, four MiG-21s, five Su-20/22s, eight Mig-23s, and two Mirage F-1EQs (delivered only weeks earlier), as well as damaging eleven others beyond repair, including two Tu-16 bombers. Two Iraqi pilots and fourteen personnel were killed, together with three Egyptian and an East German officer, while 19 Iraqis, four Egyptians, and two Jordanians were badly injured. This strike considerably degraded Iraq's capability to retaliate.

=== Operation Desert Storm and the 1990s ===
H-3 and H-2 became priority targets for coalition aircraft during the Gulf War. The airfield was targeted by different types of aircraft, from F-117 stealth fighters to US Navy A-6 intruders. Chemical weapons were stored at the H-3 airfield (main) during Operation Desert Storm in 1991 according to declassified U.S. intelligence reports which describe Iraqi efforts to disperse chemical weapons by truck to other locations. The S-shaped bunker located at H-3 airfield (main) and the four at the H-3 ammunition storage facility were damaged or destroyed during Desert Storm. Of the 22 S-shaped bunkers located across Iraq, 10 had been destroyed as of 8 February 1991. It is not known whether the rest were subsequently destroyed.

In response to Iraqi hostile acts against coalition aircraft monitoring the Southern No-Fly Zone, Operation Southern Watch coalition aircraft used precision-guided weapons to strike an air defense command and control facility at a military airfield 240 miles west and slightly south of Baghdad, at approximately 2:30 a.m. EDT on 5 September 2002. Aircraft dropped precision-guided bombs on the H3 airfield. The strikes were carried out by nine American F-15 Strike Eagles and three RAF Tornado GR4 ground attack aircraft flying from Kuwait. The attack on the air defence command and control facility was the first time that a target in western Iraq had been attacked during the patrols of the southern no-fly zone. According to press reports, about 100 US and British aircraft took part in the attack, making it the biggest single operation over the country in four years.

=== 2003 Iraq War ===
==== Seizure ====
On 18 March 2003, B and D Squadrons of the British 22nd SAS Regiment infiltrated Iraq along with 1 Squadron Australian SASR and headed for H-2 and H-3 Air Base. They set up observation posts and called in airstrikes that defeated the minimal Iraqi resistance around H-2. The combined British and Australian squadrons then drove straight onto H-2 virtually unopposed. H-3 airbase was defended by a battalion of Iraqi troops and significant numbers of mobile and static anti aircraft guns. The British and Australian SAS were joined by members of Delta Force and on 24 March by Green Beret ODAs from Bravo company, 1st Battalion 5th SFG. Together they called in a constant 24 hours of precision airstrikes on H-3, forcing the Iraqi defenders to flee. The Coalition SOF secured H-3 and seized around 80 assorted anti aircraft cannon guns and an enormous amount of ammunition. A company of Rangers and Royal Marines from 45 Commando flew from Jordan to reinforce the air bases, the Coalition SOF handed the bases over to their control and proceeded with their other missions.

=== Current status ===
Current aerial imagery shows that the operational structures around the airfield and its three auxiliary airfields appear to be largely intact. The taxiways at the airfields remain exposed to the elements. The use of runways is interdicted by a series of obstacles, including unusable airframes.
