= Nave Andromeda incident =

Fabricated maritime hijacking in the English Channel

- Time: 25 October 2020
- Location: English Channel, off the coast of the Isle of Wight, United Kingdom
- Also known as: Nave Andromeda hijacking
- Type: Stowaway incident
- Participants: Nave Andromeda with 22 crew members; 7 stowaways; 16 Special Boat Service operators; Hampshire Constabulary; Maritime and Coastguard Agency
- Outcome: Seven stowaways detained

On 25 October 2020, the Liberian-flagged crude oil tanker Nave Andromeda issued a distress call while in the English Channel just off the coast of the Isle of Wight, in response to the presence of seven stowaways who had boarded the ship in Lagos, Nigeria. Hampshire Constabulary responded to the call, and the British maritime special forces unit, the Special Boat Service, boarded the vessel and detained the stowaways. Two of the stowaways were subsequently charged with conduct endangering ships, though the charges were later dropped after the Crown Prosecution Service found insufficient evidence that the ship or crew were threatened, or that the men had intended to hijack the ship.

== Summary ==
=== Preceding events ===
On 5 October 2020, Nave Andromeda, a 228-metre-long (748 ft) crude oil tanker registered in Liberia, departed Lagos, Nigeria en route to Southampton, England. Its captain and senior officers were Greek, while the remainder of its 22 crew members were predominantly Filipino. Seven stowaways had boarded the ship in Lagos, climbing into its rudder stock. In a June 2022 interview, two of the stowaways said they had been escaping gang violence in Nigeria. On 15 October 2020, at the Port of Las Palmas, the seven men left the rudder stock, hoping to be taken to land, but were instead brought onto the Nave Andromeda's deck as Spanish authorities denied the ship permission to dock. They were then given clean clothes, food and water, and housed in a locked cabin for five days, during which they were fed regularly and escorted onto the deck for fresh air. On 16 October, the ship again set sail, and arrived at Saint-Nazaire, France, on 20 October. Permission to dock was again denied after the captain informed port officials of the stowaways' presence. Due to diminishing supplies, relations between the stowaways and crew became strained but remained cordial. On 24 October, the ship's officers met with officials from its owners, Navios Tankers Management. The following morning, the crew were told to shelter in the ship's citadel.

=== Incident ===
The Nave Andromeda issued a mayday call at around 9:00 am on 25 October 2020, whilst the ship was off the coast of the Isle of Wight in the English Channel, to which HM Coastguard responded. Hampshire Constabulary began their own response at 10:04 am with support from the Maritime and Coastguard Agency and UK Border Force. In the distress call, the ship's captain said seven stowaways had escaped a cabin where they had been locked, and that most of the 22 crew members had been instructed to lock themselves in the ship's citadel. The distress call did not use the word "hijacking". The authorities did not believe the incident was terror-related or related to weapons of mass destruction, but the ship's erratic movements raised concern for the welfare of the crew. Defence Secretary Ben Wallace described being informed that the stowaways were "threatening to do something with the ship", which constituted a threat to life that went beyond the capacities of Hampshire Constabulary. The Crown Prosecution Service later concluded that evidence failed to show that the ship or crew had been threatened. The stowaways later said they had been alarmed by the lack of sounds of activity on the ship as well as the stoppage of meals, and their observation that the vessel was drifting, and therefore broke out of the cabin after several hours due to fears the ship had been abandoned. Crew members' accounts suggested that, while the distress call said the stowaways had broken out of their cabin, in reality they only did so hours after the call was made.

The crew were confined to the citadel for approximately 10 hours, whilst the ship was watched closely by police and coastguard helicopters. A three-mile exclusion zone around the ship was established. Royal National Lifeboat Institution lifeboats were also dispatched from Selsey and Bembridge. Isle of Wight Radio began reporting on what it described as an attempted hijacking around midday, and Hampshire Constabulary acknowledged an "ongoing incident". By 3:45 pm, Coastguard helicopters were circling over the ship.

=== Special Boat Service boarding ===
On the evening of 25 October 2020, Hampshire Constabulary made a formal request for military support to help regain control of the ship. This request was approved by the Secretary of State for Defence Ben Wallace and Home Secretary Priti Patel. At around 7:30 pm, 40 military personnel were deployed to the scene via a Chinook helicopter, including members of the maritime special forces unit, the Special Boat Service (SBS). Additionally, Royal Navy mine clearance divers were also put on standby in case the ship had been mined.

When night fell, 16 SBS operators boarded the ship, with some fast-roping from two Royal Navy Merlin helicopters and the others climbing up the side from rigid inflatable boats. They were watched over by snipers in a Wildcat helicopter, and the Royal Navy frigate HMS Richmond was also reportedly on standby to assist. The captain of the ship remained in constant communication with the authorities and turned off the ship's lights to allow the helicopters to conduct "obscurant tactics" – shining their lights so as to disorient the stowaways. In just nine minutes, the 10-hour stand-off came to an end, with the stowaways detained and the ship secured. The stowaways did not resist. The Nave Andromeda was brought into the dock at the Port of Southampton. Despite the darkness of the night, the operation was observable from the shores of Ventnor.

The stowaways were arrested by Hampshire Police "on suspicion of seizing or exercising control of a ship by use of threats or force". They were held at Southampton Central police station, then transferred to Colnbrook Immigration Removal Centre. The Nave Andromeda's captain and crew were questioned by police while the ship sat in port. After several days, the ship continued on its voyage to Russia.

=== Aftermath ===
Following the incident, Prime Minister Boris Johnson praised the police and armed forces, stating: "Both police and armed forces did a fantastic job and I thank them very, very much for what they did to keep our shores safe". The Home Secretary Priti Patel stated: "Tonight we are thankful for the quick and decisive action of our police and armed forces who were able to bring this situation under control, guaranteeing the safety of all those on board". Navios Tankers Management thanked the UK authorities for their "timely and professional response". Lawyers for the ship's owners, however, said no hijacking had occurred.

In December 2020, two of the stowaways were charged with conduct endangering ships and imprisoned on remand, while the other five remained in immigration detention. They were each later placed in temporary accommodation. In January 2021, the Crown Prosecution Service (CPS) dropped its case against the seven stowaways after evidence analysis cast doubt over whether or not the ship and its crew were in danger. The CPS stated that initial reports indicated there was a "real and imminent threat" to the vessel, however evidence – including mobile phone footage and witness accounts – did not show that the ship or its crew were threatened, nor was there any evidence to suggest the stowaways had any intention to hijack the ship. The Home Office released a statement criticising the CPS's decision. As of June 2022, two of the men's asylum claims were awaiting a decision.

In March 2021, The Guardian published an interview with one of the stowaways, in which he said he and his fellows had not attempted to hijack the vessel, but rather had approached the ship's crew after the crew members' routine changed and they became concerned the ship was sinking. Ed Davey, the leader of the Liberal Democrats, accused Patel and Wallace of overreacting in their response to reports from the ship, and described their behaviour as "a farce".

== See also ==
- Grande Tema incident
