= Grande Tema incident =

Ship stowaway incident in England

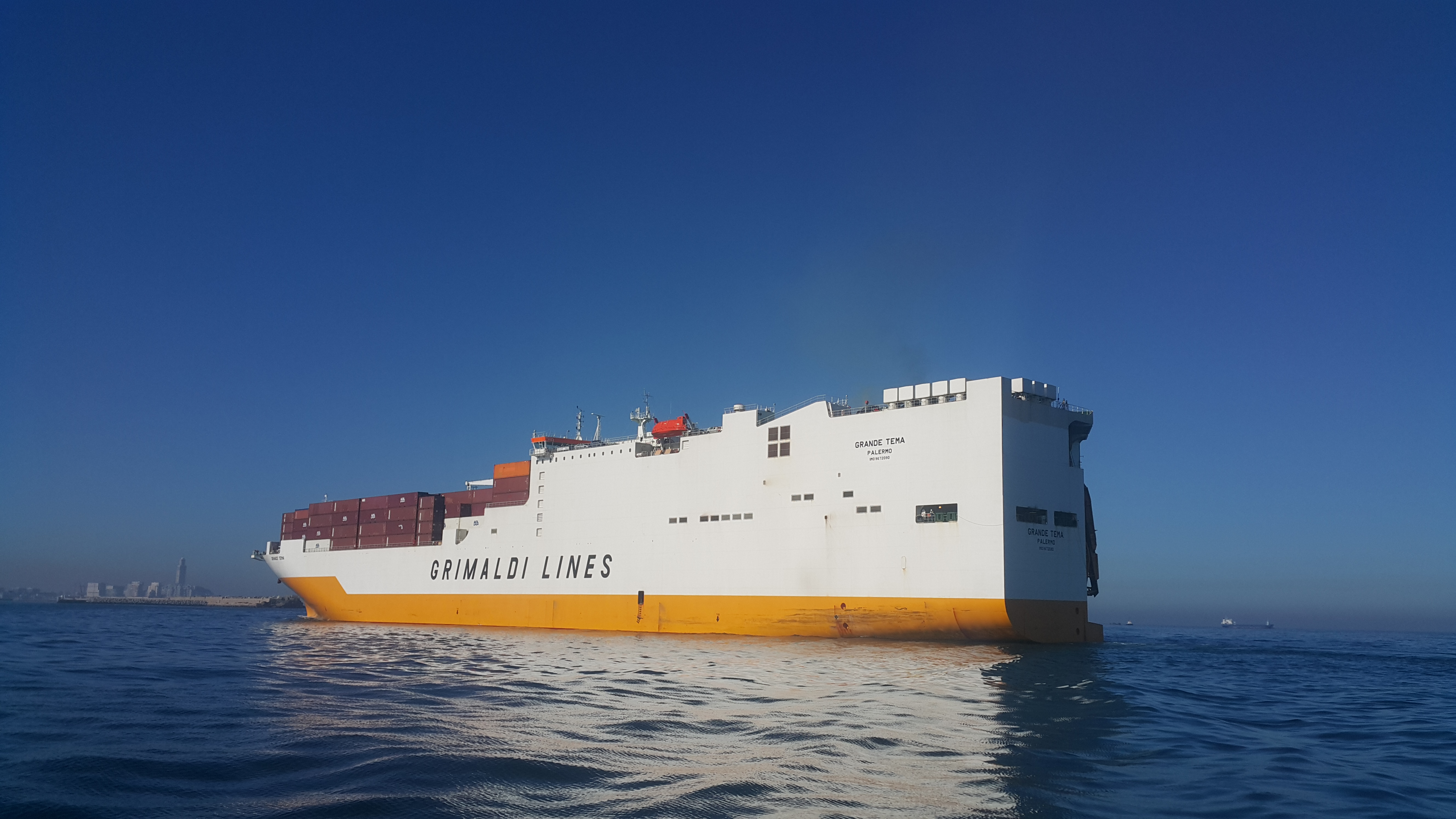
Grande Tema pictured in 2020

On 21 December 2018, there was an incident aboard the container ship Grande Tema in the Thames Estuary. Four stowaways, who had travelled aboard the vessel from Lagos, Nigeria, demanded to be let off near the British shore. The crew of the Grimaldi Group ship refused, and when the stowaways made threats, they barricaded themselves on the bridge. The British authorities were alerted, and following failed negotiations, special forces operatives from the Special Boat Service landed on the vessel and detained the stowaways. The men were later found guilty of affray and making threats to kill and received prison sentences.

== Incident and resolution ==
Grande Tema is a Grimaldi Group 71,000-tonne (70,000-long-ton; 78,000-short-ton) ConRo ship. She left Tin Can Island Port in Lagos, Nigeria, on 10 December 2018, bound for the Port of Tilbury in the United Kingdom. Around 16 December, four male stowaways were discovered by the ship's captain Antonio Raggi in the lower deck ramp area. When discovered, two men were hanging over rails close to the ship's propellers. The crew gave the stowaways food, water, and clothing and secured them into a room.

On 21 December, when Grande Tema was off Ramsgate in Kent, the stowaways broke free from the room and armed themselves with metal poles. With the vessel some 7 miles (11 km) off Ramsgate, they demanded that the ship be moved closer to the British coast so that they could swim ashore. Raggi refused their request, and the stowaways made threats to the crew. The 27-man crew barricaded themselves into the bridge and alerted the British authorities. The stowaways attacked the windows, threw faeces and urine, and made cut-throat gestures in an attempt to gain access to the bridge. One of the men intentionally cut himself. Raggi feared that the stowaways might have links to the Boko Haram terrorist group and may have hidden weapons on board the vessel.

Police negotiators made contact with the stowaways. During the negotiations, the stowaways claimed that there had originally been a fifth member of their group who had fallen overboard. Traffic in the nearby English Channel was disrupted as a result of the incident, with the vessel sailing in circles in the Thames Estuary until the situation was resolved.

Progress could not be made, and as the stand-off reached 14 hours and with the vessel near Margate, a military intervention was decided. Several Special Boat Service operatives fast-roped onto the vessel from Royal Navy helicopters at around 23:00 and secured it within 25 minutes, with no injuries. The British had asked Raggi to turn off his ship's lights at the start of the operation to hinder the stowaways. The ship was sailed to Tilbury, arriving at 04:20, where the four stowaways were arrested by Essex Police on immigration charges.

== Aftermath ==
The four stowaways, Samuel Jolumi, 27, Ishola Sunday, 28, Toheeb Popoola, 27, and Joberto McGee, 21, originating from Nigeria and Liberia, were tried at the Old Bailey in London in September 2019. All four were charged with affray and attempting to hijack a vessel. In addition, McGee, described as the ringleader, was charged with two counts of making a threat to kill, and Popoola was charged with one count of that offence. In mitigation, McGee claimed he had to flee West Africa to avoid being forced to join a gang, while the others cited desperation and impulsivity. The presiding judge praised the "fortitude and good sense" of Italian captain Antonio Raggi during the incident.

In November, all four men were cleared of the hijack charges but found guilty of the remainder. The four were sentenced on 3 January 2020, with McGee receiving 32 months' imprisonment, Popoola 31 months, and the other two men 16 months. The men faced a Home Office investigation into their immigration status.

Popoola was released in August 2020, after serving about 20 months in prison. He applied for asylum, but the claim was denied in January 2021. He appealed the case, but before the result of the appeal was handed down, he committed suicide by hanging in July 2021.

== See also ==
- Nave Andromeda incident, a similar occurrence aboard a tanker near the Isle of Wight in 2020. It was also resolved by intervention from the Special Boat Service.
