= Kirkuk–Haifa oil pipeline =

Oil pipeline that ran between Iraq and the British Mandate of Palestine from 1935 to 1948

- Map of Kirkuk–Haifa oil pipeline

General information
- Type: Crude oil
- Operator: Iraq Petroleum Company
- Construction started: 1932
- Commissioned: 1934
- Decommissioned: 1948 (to Haifa)

Technical information
- Length: 1,856 km (1,153 mi)
- Diameter: 12 in (305 mm)
- No. of pumping stations: 12

The Kirkuk-Mediterranean pipeline was a mixed 10/12-inch twin crude oil pipeline from the landlocked oil fields in Kirkuk, located in the former Ottoman vilayet of Mosul in northern Iraq, through Transjordan to Haifa in mandatory Palestine, now in the territory of Israel; and through Syria and a short stretch of what was to become the state of Lebanon to Tripoli. The oil arriving on the coast was shipped to European refineries until in 1939 the refinery in Haifa was completed, soon capable of processing the entire supply. For a few years before 1948, crude oil was transported from Tripoli to Haifa by tankers.

The pipeline was built by the Iraq Petroleum Company between 1932 and 1934, the company's first pipeline. The double pipeline split at Haditha (Pumping Station K-3) at the Euphrates river crossing.

The pipeline and the Haifa refineries were considered strategically important by the British Government, and provided much of the fuel needs of the British and American forces in the Mediterranean during World War II. After the Fall of France, for about one year of conflict in the Middle East, different parts of the pipeline system were in the hands of opposing forces. After the war, with Israel now in possession of the southern terminal, the whole southern branch was cut off from Iraqi oil deliveries and eventually abandoned. During the Suez Crisis, the northern branch was sabotaged by the Syrian government in solidarity with Egypt and remained shut down for 4 months, followed by a slow recovery to prior levels.

The pipeline was a target of attacks by Arabs during the 1936–1939 Arab revolt in Palestine. One of the main objectives of a joint British-Jewish Special Night Squads commanded by Captain Orde Wingate was to protect the pipeline against such attacks. Later on, the pipeline was the target of attacks by the Jewish Irgun paramilitary organisation.

Oil production in Iraq
| | Barrels |
|---|---|
| <1927 | 0 |
| 1927 | 338,000 |
| 1928 | 713,000 |
| 1929 | 798,000 |
| 1930 | 909,000 |
| 1931 | 900,000 |
| 1932 | 836,000 |
| 1933 | 917,000 |
| 1934 | 7,689,000 |
| 1935 | 27,408,000 |
| 1936 | 30,406,000 |
| 1937 | 31,836,000 |
| 1938 | 32,643,000 |

== Construction ==
Iraqi oil production in 1932 was 1,000,000 to 1,200,000 bbls/a. The planned capacity of the new pipe line was 30,000,000 bbls/a. H. S. Austin, president of the Tuscarora Oil Co. and the Ajax Pipe Line Co., responsible for the Ajax Pipeline, was head of the construction work. The Ajax was a 400 mile, 65,000 bbls/day, twin 10-inch line from the Glenn Pool oil fields to the Wood River refinery complex and was completed in 1930 or 1931.

The Tuscarora Oil Company, a subsidiary of Standard Oil of New Jersey, was not engaged in pipeline construction at the time. At the end of 1929 it had reconditioned (cleaned) its 370 or 400 mile 10-inch 25,000 bbl/day crude oil pipeline from Cooks Ferry, on the Ohio River in Western Pennsylvania to the Bayway Refinery in New Jersey and now used it to transport gasoline in the opposite direction from east to west.

World Petroleum devoted the September 1932 issue to Iraq.

IPC signed conventions regulating the transit of oil with Mandatory ...

- Palenstine: 5 January 1931
- Syria: 25 March 1931
- Lebanon: 25 March 1931

=== Pipe ===
Pipe production
| Contractor | Subcontractors | Size | Joints | x 1000 ft | Miles | Sleeves | x 1000 kg |
|---|---|---|---|---|---|---|---|
| (France) Comptoir Franco Belgo Sarrois | (France) Louvroil & Recquignies; (France) S.A. d'Escaut et Meuse; (France) Acieries et Usines a Tubes de la Sarre | 12 | 76,690 | 2,779 | 526 | 79,870 | 56,878 |
| (United Kingdom) Stewarts & Lloyds Ltd. | (United Kingdom) Bromford Tube Co. Ltd.; (United Kingdom) British Mannesmann Tube Co. Ltd. | 12 | 49,140 | 1,768 | 334 | 49,376 | 36,673 |
| (United Kingdom) Oil Well Engineering Co. | (Germany) Mannesmannroehren Werke Dusseldorf; (Germany) Vereinigte Stahlwerke AG Dusseldorf; (Germany) Bismarckhutte Hajduki Wielkie (Poland) | 12 | 17,480 | 629 | 118 | 18,393 | 13,311 |
| Oil Well Engineering Co. | British Mannesmann Tube Co. Ltd. | 12 | 4,813 | 177 | 33 | 5,054 | 3,746 |
| Stewarts & Lloyds Ltd. | Bromford Tube Co. Ltd. | 12 (Note: Extra Heavy) | 229 | 9 | 1 | 0 | 266 |
| British Mannesmann Tube Co. Ltd. | | 10 | 7,095 | 265 | 50 | 7,456 | 4,343 |
| Stewarts & Lloyds | | 10 | 6,703 | 247 | 46 | 6,674 | 4,092 |
| Oil Well Engineering Co. | Vereinigte Stahlwerke AG Dusseldorf; Mannesmannrohren Werke Dusseldorf | 10 | 3,526 | 132 | 25 | 3,687 | 2,161 |
| Oil Well Engineering Co. | (United States) Youngstown Sheet & Tube Co.; (United States) Spang Chalfant & Co.; (United States) National Tube Co. | 10 | 5,542 | 205 | 38 | 5,821 | 1,272 |
| Oil Well Engineering Co. | National Tube Co. | 10 | 4,393 | 169 | 32 | 4,612 | 3,200 |
| Stewarts & Lloyds | | 8 | 2,107 | 78 | 14 | 1,340 | 1,059 |
| Total | | 12 | 148,352 | 5,362 | 1,012 | 152,693 | 110,874 |
| Total | | 10 | 27,259 | 1,018 | 191 | 28,250 | 15,068 |

=== Logistics ===
==== Aviation ====
On 16 October 1932, aviation became available when one 3-engine 8-passenger Avro 618 Ten and one single-engine 4-passenger DH.50 arrived at Samakh. Both planes were purchased. In March 1933, a Farman monoplane was purchased and stationed at Homs. In March 1933, the 2 planes on the southern leg were replaced by two 3-engine 5-passenger Westland Wessex. Around May 1933 the planes were relocated to a base at Haifa.

In the early winter of 1933, the two planes based at Haifa were replaced by two twin-engine 6-passenger DH Dragon. Between October 1932 and June 1934, 6,993 passengers and 200 tons of freight were moved, over 2,971 flights, 309,000 flown miles and 3,427 flown hours.

==== To the Depots ====
Total employment (including contract labor) at end of quarter
| Quarter | Class I | Class II | Class III |
|---|---|---|---|
| 2nd 1932 | 92 | 129 | 1,664 |
| 3rd 1932 | 229 | 338 | 4,519 |
| 4th 1932 | 332 | 460 | 5,892 |
| 1st 1933 | 358 | 636 | 9,359 |
| 2nd 1933 | 393 | 850 | 12,441 |
| 3rd 1933 | 387 | 933 | 13,044 |
| 4th 1933 | 372 | 800 | 9,076 |
| 1st 1934 | 375 | 701 | 9,214 |
| 2nd 1934 | 357 | 670 | 10,983 |
| 3rd 1934 | 331 | 597 | 8,872 |

There was one railhead for each of the 3 legs, which became depots and sites for workshops, offices and living quarters with employment ranging from 300 to 1,200 per site. One was at Baiji, a few miles east of what would become the K-2 pumping station, supplied via Basra and transported via metre-gauge to Baghdad and standard-gauge to Baiji (map). The southern leg depot was at Mafraq on the Hejaz Railway, supplied via Haifa and for the northern leg, Homs was chosen as it was already host to several small industries.

A fourth depot was erected at Haditha, with no railhead it nonetheless became the largest of the depots, a trans-shipping point, the headquarters of the Eastern Area of the project and the base for K-3 construction personnel. A fifth depot was built at Tripoli. When construction wound down in 1934, the depots at Baiji, Mafraq and Homs were already in the process of being stripped of materials. The depot at Tripoli became the new pipe line terminal. The status of Haditha remained unclear.

From August 1932 to May 1934 a total of 207,500 tons arrived from overseas: 57,000 at Haifa, 54,000 at Tripoli and 96,500 at Basra. Rail transport to the depots amounted to 37 million metric-ton miles. An additional 200,000 tons of building materials were obtained from local sources.

==== From the Depots ====
By 15 May 1933, 801 miles, about 66%, of pipe had been laid out. This amounted to 4,750,000 ton miles of haulage of pipe, and 7,000,000 overall haulage at this point of the estimated total 23,000,000 ton miles required. Over time the distance driven from the depot to the current end of the line increased.

=== Communications ===
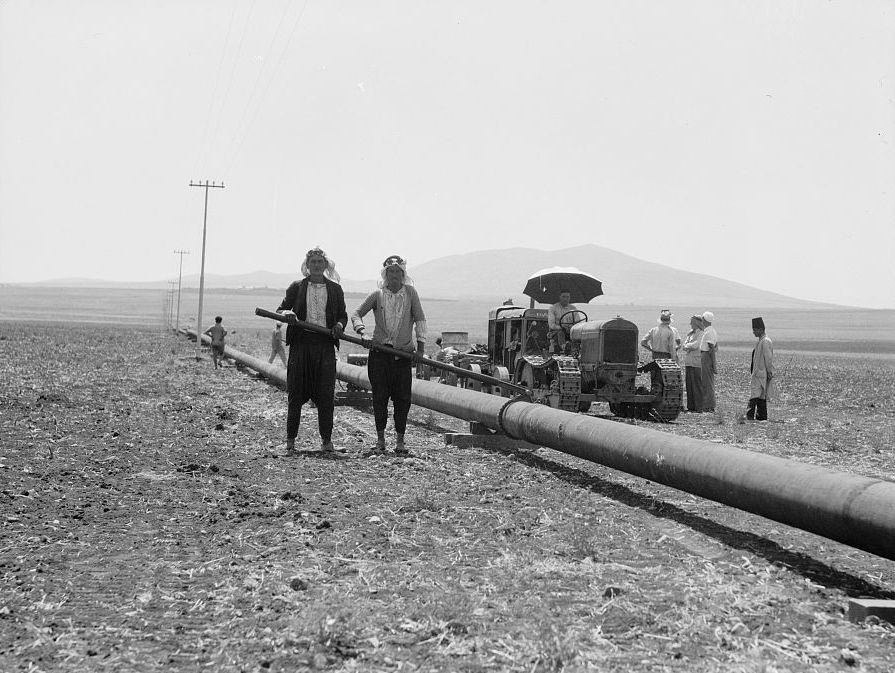
IPC assistants welding pipes in the Jezreel Valley next to a telephone mast

Between September 1932 and April 1933, one pair of telegraph and one pair of telephone wires were installed along the route. Nearly 26,000 tubular steel poles weighing 3,500 tons and 5,000 miles or 700 tons of cadmium copper wire were required. The posts were 25 feet high with a 48-inch cross arm and placed 211 feet apart (25 poles per mile), except if the terrain made this impractical. In that case some of the poles were 28 and 32 feet high as well. The river crossings were entirely different cases of special terrain.

=== Welding ===
Welding campaigns
| River crossing | | | | Start | End | |
|---|---|---|---|---|---|---|
| Euphrates | | | | 3 September 1932 | 5 October 1932 | |
| Tigris | | | | 7 October 1932 | 28 October 1932 | |
| Crew | Total miles | Start (mile) | End (mile) | Start | End | Pipe |
| No. 1 | 368 (Note: No. 1 crew was reinforced in the late stage by elements from the other crews) | 0 | Tigris (53) | 3 December 1932 | 4 April 1933 | twin |
| No. 1 | 368 | 127 | Euphrates (149) | | | twin |
| No. 1 | 368 | 156 | Jordan border (373) | | 19 November 1933 | |
| No. 2 | 260 | 53 | 127 | 1 December 1932 | 21 May 1933 | twin |
| No. 2 | 260 | 149 | 156 | | | twin |
| No. 2 | 260 | 156 | Syrian border (249) | | 30 August 1933 | |
| No. 3 | 262 | 574 | 482 | early December | 26 April 1933 | |
| No. 3 | 262 | 574 | Haifa | | 25 July 1933 | |
| No. 3 | 262 | 482 | Iraq border (373) | | 21 October 1933 | |
| No. 4 | 282 | Tripoli (525) | Iraq border (249) | November 1932 | 6 July 1933 | |

=== Startup ===
Trade of Iraq Oil (x 1000 barrels, FY ending 31 March)
| | 1935 | 1936 | 1937 | 1938 | 1939 |
via Tripoli
| arriving | 5,816 | 14,081 | 15,119 | 15,521 | 15,367 |
| exported | 4,680 | 14,020 | 15,218 | 15,515 | 15,280 |
| ...France | 4,132 | 10,868 | 13,170 | 14,081 | 11,803 |
| ...UK | 459 | 1,883 | 1,589 | 765 | 1,643 |
via Haifa
| arriving | 6,193 | 14,532 | 14,783 | 15,348 | 15,185 |
| exported | 5,267 | 14,514 | 15,062 | 14,898 | 14,985 |
| ...France | 3,820 | 10,774 | 11,244 | 8,825 | 10,256 |
| ...UK | 1,277 | 2,825 | 2,198 | 3,604 | 2,417 |

The Tripoli line was filled starting in early June 1934 with half of the pumping stations in operation and in July there had been attained a preliminary production capacity of 20,000 bbls/day or about 50% of rated capacity. Oil first arrived at the Tripoli terminal on 14 July 1934. The French chartered tanker Henry Desprez left for Le Havre on 3 August 1934 with a first shipment of 14,600 tons and arrived on 20 August.

Later, essentially all deliveries were earmarked for the new 15,000 bbls/day refinery at Martigues (near Marseille), a haul of approximately 1900 nautical miles. and the new 25,000bbl/day Normandy Refinery in Gonfreville (Le Havre; ca 3600 nm). Martigues was the 3rd largest refinery in France at the time,. but only completed in 1935.

The first oil arrived in Haifa on 14 October 1934, seven years to the day after oil was first struck at the Baba Gurgur No. 1 well. The first shipment left Haifa on the French tanker Vendemiaire on 25 October, bound for Le Havre.

Total oil deliveries through the pipeline in calendar year 1934 were 7,096,669 barrels and in 1935 27,014,904 barrels (74,013 bbl/d or about 87% of rated capacity).

The total cost of the project was $50,000,000.

The Iraqi Petroleum Company in October 1934 published a 125-page report: The Construction of the Iraq-Mediterrnean Pipe-Line — A Tribute to the Men Who Built it. World Petroleum devoted 40 pages to the project in the February 1935 issue.

There were a total of 5 opening ceremonies: 14 January 1935 in Kirkuk, 17 January in Damascus, 19 January in Tripoli, 22 January in Haifa, and 24 January in Amman, an average rate of 0.16 ceremonies per day for the month of January.

The IPC Kirkuk operation was beaten to the punch by the Bahrain Petroleum Company, which had struck oil in 1932, but due to vastly more favourable conditions, and after sending only one shipload worth of equipment for infrastructure construction, was able to send to Japan its first load of oil on 7 June 1934.

== Pumping stations ==
The pumping stations were named in numerical order going westwards, with the stations from Kirkuk to Haditha denoted "K" (after Kirkuk) and the subsequent ones to the Mediterranean coast at Haifa denoted "H" (after Haifa) and those to Tripoli denoted "T". H-4 and H-5 are in Jordan, T-2, T-3, T-4 in Syria, all others on Iraqi soil.

Sketched maps can be found in except for K-1 and K-2. Stations for which exact coordinates are given are clearly identifiable by the remains seen through Google Maps as of 2025.

Pumping stations
| Name | Altitude (ft) | Mile | Downstream (1934) | bold=exact |
|---|---|---|---|---|
| K-1 | 1,008 | 0 | 31.5 miles twin 10-inch, 34.5 miles twin 12-inch | 35°30′55″N 044°18′49″E |
| K-2 | 478 | 66 | 4.5 miles twin 10-inch, 79.5 miles twin 12-inch | 34°54′47″N 043°24′50″E |
| K-3 | 453 | 150 | north: 3.5 miles 10-inch, 56.5 miles 12-inch | 34.07073°N 42.35025°E |
| K-3 | 453 | 150 | south: 6 miles twin (Note: to ensure full capacity while limiting the number of H-x pumping stations to 5) 10-inch, 45 miles 12-inch | 34.07073°N 42.35025°E |
| T-1 | 1,027 | 211 | 8.5 miles 10-inch, 59.5 miles 12-inch | 34°13′37″N 041°19′50″E |
| T-2 | 1,248 | 279 | 5 miles 10-inch, 76 miles 12-inch | 34°22′35″N 040°09′08″E |
| T-3 | 1,268 | 360 | 4 miles 10-inch, 57 miles 12-inch | 34°31′47″N 038°44′48″E |
| T-4 | 1,086 | 421 | 10.5 miles 10-inch, 57.5 miles 12-inch, 20.5 miles 10-inch, 21 miles 12-inch | 34.54607°N 37.69678°E |
| Tripoli | | 532 | | |
| H-1 | 1,312 | 205.5 | 4.5 miles 10-inch, 54 miles 12-inch | 33.78813°N 41.45914°E |
| H-2 | 1,923 | 263.5 | 4 miles 10-inch, 54 miles 12-inch | 33°22′38″N 040°37′04″E |
| H-3 | 2,550 | 321.5 | 4.5 miles 10-inch, 91 miles 12-inch | 32.94631°N 39.73192°E |
| H-4 | 2,249 | 416.5 | 8.5 miles 10-inch, 53 miles 12-inch, 5 miles 10-inch (Note: these 5 miles and the 10-inch loop at the downstream of H-5 were due to a last minute relocation of the pumping station to a nearby mudflat for use as a landing strip) | 32°30′09″N 038°11′32″E |
| H-5 | 2,338 | 483 | 4.5 miles twin 10-inch, 79.5 miles 12-inch, 8 miles 8-inch, 16 miles heavy twin 10-inch, 29.5 miles 12-inch (Note: This unusual arrangement was a means to control the pressure while the pipeline descended from 2,575 feet at mile 567 to -885ft at mile 581 and then cleared the hills west of the Jordan river.) | 32.19227°N 37.116445°E |
| Haifa | 20 | 621 | | |

1934
| Station (each) | Pumps | Transmission | Engines |
|---|---|---|---|
| K | 6 x Worthington-Simpson 6.75-in x 24-in (Note: Dimensions written as bore x stroke throughout) horiz. double acting | single reduction herringbone gears | 6 x Sulzer 4-cycle 5-cyl. 500 hp diesel |
| T | 3 x the above | single reduction herringbone gears | 3 x Werkspoor 4-cycle 5-cyl. 500 hp diesel |
| H | 3 x the above | single reduction herringbone gears | 3 x Harland&Wolff 4-cycle 6-cyl. 500 hp diesel |
1949
| K-1 | 3 x series pair of Mather&Platt 1800 hp motor centrifugal (Note: One pair on standby) | electric | Kirkuk field power plant |
| K | 3 x series pair of Mather&Platt 1800 hp motor centrifugal | electric | 6 x Crossley-Premier 2000 hp opposed 16-cyl diesel, 1560kva alternator |
| T | 4 x Worthington-Simpson horiz. double-acting 7.75-in x 24-in | flexible coupling | 4 x Harland&Wolff 300rpm 950 bhp airless injection oil engines |

== Tripoli Terminal ==
There were 3 loading berths at the terminal, 4 mooring buoys per berth, at a depth of 50 feet of water. To each berth two 12-inch pipes were laid on the ocean floor in a fan-wise arrangement. To each pair of pipes a pair of flexible 10-inch hoses connected. The end of the pipes were at 4,420, 4,400 and 5,470 feet from the coast line and the berths 2,600 feet apart. With the tanks at the terminal sitting at 220 feet above sea level, gravity loading was used which could be assisted with lower power pumps and deliver 1,000 tons of oil per hour.

There were 15 tanks of 93,000 bbl capacity each (a total of 1,395,000). In March 1947 there were 27 tanks totaling 2,300,000bbl at Tripoli and 36 of 93,000bbl each at the end of 1949. During the war a small 5,000bbl/day topping plant was built at Tripoli.

== Haifa Terminal ==
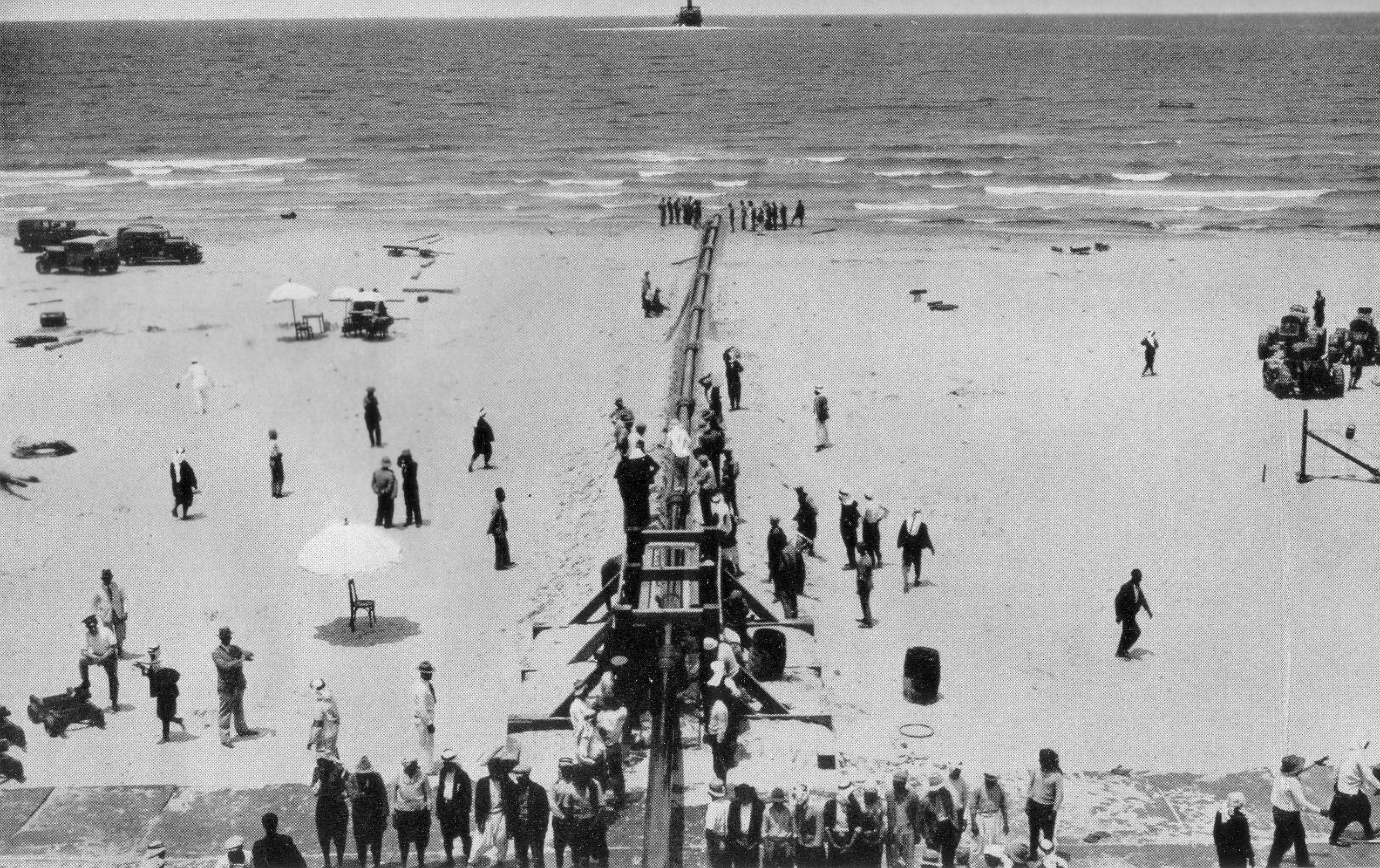
An underwater loading line at Haifa, 1938

There were 2 loading berths at the terminal, 4 mooring buoys per berth, at a depth of 32 feet of water. To each berth one extra heavy 12-inch pipe was laid on the ocean floor at right angles to the coast line. To each pipe, an Y-joint and two 8-inch flexible hoses were attached. The end of the lines were 4,212 and 4,201 feet from the shore with 2,600 feet separation between the berths. Centrifugal pumps on shore could deliver 1,000 tons per hour.

There were 15 tanks of 93,000 bbl capacity at the Haifa terminal originally and 27 of 93,000bbl each at the end of 1949.

=== Refinery ===
The Consolidated Refineries, Ltd. was jointly owned by the Anglo-Iranian Oil Co., Ltd and the Anglo-Saxon Petroleum Co. (Shell), with A.I.O.C. in charge of plant operation. Both companies held a 23.75% (each) interest in the Iraq Petroleum Company (IPC). In September 1936 plans were announced to lay a railway siding from the Haifa-Acre line for the transportation of building materials.

The refinery was constructed by the M. W. Kellogg Co. 3.5 miles northeast of the Port of Haifa on 360 acres. Construction began in October 1938 and production started on 29 November 1939, not too long after the outbreak of World War II and due to a crash program well ahead of schedule. Unit 2 was brought online in 1941, unit 3 in August 1944, by which time the refinery had reached the capacity needed to process all oil that the 12-inch pipelines could deliver from Kirkuk, albeit with compromises made that boosted quantity at the expense of quality. Oil arriving in Tripoli was brought to Haifa by tankers (one-way distance of 81 nautical miles), though this arrangement was not part of the original plan for the refinery.

The Oil & Gas Journal published a detailed technical description in the 1945-11-17 issue. In March 1947 the construction of a fourth unit of the same capacity was about to begin, work on the new 16-inch loop line from Kirkuk was already underway at that point. The refinery shut down indefinitely on 12 April 1948 due to a strike of Arab workers following an attack in which several of them were injured. This was subsequent to the Haifa Oil Refinery massacre of 30 December 1947.

In October 1949 operations resumed on a much reduced scale using Venezuela crude oil as input. In June 1950 an agreement was reached to increase production to 20,000 bbl/day, saving an estimated $3,000,000 annually to Israel and covering 65 percent of the country's gasoline needs. Egypt was maintaining a blockade for ships through the Suez Canal heading to the plant. The source of crude oil was Qatar, tankers were to take the route around the Cape of Good Hope.

At the end of 1955 the refinery was still operating at only 20% capacity. Soviet crude oil was added to the list of sources in 1955. Shipments were estimated to be 9,000 bbl/day on average during 1957 and 1958. Israel also started train runs to Haifa from their own recently discovered field at Heletz at a rate of merely 600 bbl/day in 1956.

== World War 2 ==
Oil Production in Iraq
| | Barrels |
|---|---|
| 1939 | 30,791,000 |
| 1940 | 24,225,000 |
| 1941 | 12,650,000 |
| 1942 | 19,726,000 |
| 1943 | 24,848,000 |
| 1944 | 30,943,000 |
| 1945 | 35,112,000 |
| 1946 | 35,665,000 |
| 1947 | 35,834,000 |

Crude oil inputs to Haifa refinery
| | Barrels (Note: Using the factor of 1.016*7.481=7.6 recommended by the Bureau of Mines to convert long tons to barrels.) |
|---|---|
| 1939 | 553,000 |
| 1940 | 6,438,000 |
| 1941 | 8,855,000 |
| 1942 | 15,246,000 |
| 1943 | 20,701,000 |
| 1944 | 24,941,000 |
| 1945 | (Note: including 76,000bbl from Iran)30,476,000 |
| 1946 | (Note: including 4,031,000bbl from Iran and 3,120,000bbl from Kuwait)30,563,000 |
| 1947 | (Note: including 7,581,000bbl from Kuwait)29,903,000 |

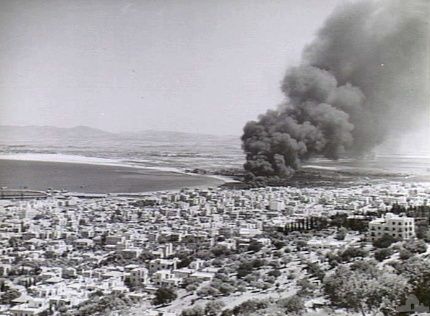
Haifa under attack, 1940

External videos
- Italian bombers attack Haifa

Deliveries of crude oil to Tripoli through Vichy France controlled Syria were suspended after the Fall of France. In the beginning of 1941 a small "refinery" was completed estimated to be able to keep running from the oil present in the tanks for a year. The products were consumed by the military and a power station in Aleppo.

Axis forces in Syria were defeated in a campaign that ended in July 1941. The northern branch was however not put into operation until early in 1943 (or late 1942, suggested by Bureau of Mines statistics) and refining capacity was lacking, both locally and in allied parts of Europe.

The Haifa refinery was struck by Italian air raids in 1940, but the damage was not severe.

The tanker Beme was sunk on 11 July 1940 near Haifa by an Italian submarine.

Deliveries to Haifa stopped for the duration of the Anglo-Iraqi War (May 1941). Bureau of mines statistics suggest that at the time the tanks at Tripoli were refilled.

The German submarine U-372 was sunk near Haifa on 4 August 1942.

The Italian submarine Scire was sunk on 10 August 1942 during an attempt to attack the port of Haifa with combat divers.

The La Mede refinery remained intact throughout the war, while French refineries on the Atlantic coast were largely destroyed. French refinery capacity as a whole returned to pre-war levels in 1947.

Trade of Iraq Oil (x 1000 barrels, calendar year)
| | 1939 | 1940 | 1941 | 1942 | 1943 (Note: Estimated in part) | 1944 | 1945 |
via Tripoli
| arriving | 14,621 | 7,171 | 730 | 1,088 | 7,500 | 12,055 | 16,071 |
| exported | 15,027 | 6,863 | 813 | 1,061 | 5,968 | 9,542 | 16,783 |
| ...France | 12,004 | 6,533 | 0 | 0 | 0 | 0 | 1,481 |
| ...UK | 1,639 | 292 | 0 | 0 | 0 | 0 | 0 |
| ...Syria | 29 | 38 | 813 | 1,061 | 1,250 | 1,496 | 1,686 |
| ...Palestine | 0 | 0 | 0 | 0 | 4,718 | 8,046 | 13,616 |
via Haifa
| arriving | 14,001 | 10,638 | 9,557 | 15,248 | 16,946 | 16,670 | 16,362 |
| exported | 14,247 | 11,591 | 8,996 | 15,377 | 16,598 | 13,431 | 16,748 |
| ...France | 9,958 | 4,330 | 0 | 0 | 0 | 0 | 0 |
| ...UK | 1,792 | 228 | 0 | 0 | 0 | 0 | 0 |
| ...Palestine | 692 | 6,691 | 8,919 | 15,377 | 16,598 | 13,406 | 16,678 |
| ...Transjordan | 692 | 6,691 | 8,919 | 15,377 | 0 | 25 | 70 |

Oil producing centers in the Africa-Asia junction in 1940
| Country | Oil field | Capacity (bbl/day) |
|---|---|---|
| Iran | Haft Kel | 150,000 |
| Iran | Masjed Soleyman | 75,000 |
| Iraq | Kirkuk | 85,000 |
| Bahrein | | 20,000 |
| Egypt | Ras Gharib | 12,500 |
| | 14 others | 28,000 |
| Country | Refinery | Capacity (bbl/day) |
| Iran | Abadan (AIOC) | 280,000 |
| Iran | Bandar Shapur (AIOC) | 50,000 |
| Iran | Kermanshah (AIOC) | 3,000 |
| Palestine | Haifa (AIOC, Shell) | 40,000 |
| Bahrein | (BAPCO) | 20,000 |
| Egypt | Suez (Shell) | 17,000 |
| Egypt | Suez (government) | 1,400 |
| Iraq | Baba Gurgur (IPC) | 1,500 |
| Iraq | Khanaqin (AIOC) | 2,500 |

== 16-inch loop ==
Oil Production in Iraq
| 1948 | 26,115,000 |
| 1949 | 30,957,000 |
| 1950 | 49,726,000 |
| 1951 | 65,122,000 (Note: How was Iraq able to increase production in 1951?) |
| 1952 | 141,100,000 |
| 1953 | 210,268,000 |

In the summer of 1939 news out of London indicated that IPC was soon going to call bids for materials for a new 16-inch loop to its Mediterranean pipeline system.

In late 1945, work began on two new 16-inch lines (85,000bbl/day each, 180,000 tons of pipe planned total), looping the two 12-inch lines in production. The project was hampered by delays. By March 1947, 150 miles of pipe had been strung (laid out) and 50 miles had been welded between H3 and H4. Materials were brought to depots at Mafraq and Baiji. The Haifa pipeline was expected to be finished in the spring of 1949, the Tripoli line a year after.

In June 1947, bids were invited for a 11,500bbl/day refinery at Baiji (K-2), Pipe laying finished in April 1948. The additional capacity of 94,000bbl/day was to be reached in the autumn. Pipe for the project was provided by British Stewards & Loyds (60,000t) and two French companies (100,000t): Ste. Escaut et Meuse (at the Anzin plant) and Ste. Louvroil, Montbard et Aulnoyne (at the Aulnoye plant). One section of 20 miles between the River Jordan and Haifa remained to be laid before deliveries could commence when work was stopped because of the unsettled conditions. see Battle of Haifa, 21–22 April.

Continued attempts to circumvent Haifa for an alternative outlet in Lebanon were hampered by the refusal of the Lebanese government to grant right-of-way permissions for the needed construction. The reason for the refusal was an attempt by Lebanon to renegotiate transit fees for pipe lines in operation. In the summer of 1961 the IPC handed over its assets in Jordan to the government, consisting of 200 miles of pipeline and pumping stations H-4 and H-5. The Jordanian government planned to distribute water from a plentiful untapped source at Azraq (due south of H-5).

1948 Iraq oil production
| Jan | Feb | Mar | Apr | May | Jun | Jul | Aug | Sep | Oct | Nov | Dec |
|---|---|---|---|---|---|---|---|---|---|---|---|
| 2,751 | 2,602 | 2,810 | 2,228 | 1,819 | 2,379 (Note: Some tanks were finished?) | 1,476 | 1,455 | 1,636 | 1,476 | 1,428 | 1,486 |

Pipe for the Tripoli 16-inch line (85,000bbl/day) was first constructed between K-3 and Tripoli. Stringing began in May 1948, welding began in October and was finished by July 1949. The 16-inch line to Tripoli went into preliminary (40,000bbl/day) operation by August 1949. The line used the 16-inch portion between Kirkuk and K-3 that was originally laid for the Haifa line. In November 1949 an extension of the small topping plant at the Tripoli terminus started production with capacity increased to 11,000bbl/day. The 16-inch line consisted of two pipes between Kirkuk and K-3.

== 30-inch loop ==
The Kirkuk–Baniyas pipeline (300,000bbl/day) between Kirkuk and a terminal some 50 miles to the north of Tripoli, outside of Lebanon territory, started preliminary production in April 1952.

Country figures below and totals for 1954 below are computed. The numbers don't line up nicely, but are matched within a percent or two.

Trade of Iraq Oil via Banias and Tripoli (x 1000 barrels)
| | 1952 | 1953 (Note: Using a factor of 7.5156 to match CIA long tons to BuMines barrel totals) | 1954 (Note: Using a factor of 7.6 to convert long tons to barrels) | 1955 (Note: Using a factor of 7.58977 to match CIA long tons to BuMines barrel totals) |
|---|---|---|---|---|
| ...France | | 64,168 | 71,189 | 70,152 |
| ...UK | | 41,434 | 32,163 | 26,094 |
| ...Italy | | 40,133 | 46,520 | 44,188 |
| ...West Germany | | 11,025 | 12,023 | 13,662 |
| ...Belgium | | 6,516 | 6,954 | 10,709 |
| ...Netherlands | | 4,998 | 8,763 | 2,026 |
| ...USA | | 879 | 1,376 | 7,529 |
| Total | 112,727 | 179,540 | 187,978 | 187,437 |
| Total per day | 308.841 | 491.890 | 515.008 | 513.526 |
| Total via Fao | 16,345 | 21,609 | 33,835 | 52,196 |

== Suez Crisis ==
At the outbreak of the crisis, in early November 1956, the T-3 and T-4 pumping stations were completely destroyed, T-2 suffered extensive damage. IPC estimated that it would be possible to resume at 80,000bpd of the approximately 515,000bpd capacity with T-1 on Iraqi soil still intact. Deliveries quickly recovered to considerably more than 80,000bpd.

Oil production in Iraq (x1000 barrels)
| Year | Jan | Feb | Mar | Apr | May | Jun | Jul | Aug | Sep | Oct | Nov | Dec |
|---|---|---|---|---|---|---|---|---|---|---|---|---|
| 1956 | 22,178 | 19,668 | 21,636 | 20,339 | 22,237 | 21,480 | 23,766 | 23,323 | 23,025 | 24,288 | 5,679 | 6,841 |
| 1957 | 6,127 | 5,613 | 10,290 | 12,519 | 13,027 | 13,114 | 14,298 | 15,220 | 17,728 | 17,093 | | |

When Israel withdrew its troops from Egypt, the Syrian government gave permission in March 1957 for repairs to commence. Damage to the pipes was minor and production at one third capacity using only Iraqi pumping stations was quickly restored.

== Second 30-inch loop ==
TBD

== Lateral lines ==
=== Ain Zalah ===
In early September 1952 IPC completed a 134 mile, 12-inch pipe between the Ain Zalah field (see map (Note: also shows the Berlin-Baghdad railway that was completed between Nusaybin and Baiji in the late 1930s)) and K-2 with production there commencing in October. The line extended from the Ain Zalah oil field northwest of Mosul south-eastwards and joined the 12-inch and 16-inch main lines at K-2. Ain Zalah was discovered in the concession west of the Tigris in 1940 and was the fourth field in Iraq to produce (after Naft Khana in 1927, Kirkuk in 1934 and Zubair at the end of 1951). The expected final production rate of the field was 25,000 bbls/day.

Stringing for the pipeline had begun in April 1952 (around the time welding ended on the Kirkuk-Banias pipeline) and lasted till 29 July. Deliveries of crude started on 16 September 1952 and a total of 281,977 barrels were produced in 1952.

The Ain Zalah field was briefly captured by the Islamic State during the month of August 2014 and the damage caused was estimated at $5 million. Kurdish forces recaptured the field on 2 September 2014.

Drilling at Ain Zalah
| | feet drilled | cumulative feet | wells completed | total wells |
|---|---|---|---|---|
| 1946 | | | | 5 or 12 (Note: 5 wells were drilled to a depth of between 5,100 and 6,000 feet and work was not resumed until 1947, perhaps another 7 were drilled shallow) (shut in) |
| 1948 | | | 4 | |
| 1951 | 7,236 | 81,372 | two at 9,713 and 10,164 | |

=== Daura ===
In December 1953, construction started on a 132 mile 12-inch pipe line from K-2 to the new refinery at Daura near Baghdad. The new line was owned by the Iraqi government, which also paid the cost of pumping the oil from K-2 to Daura and bought oil from the IPC at a token price at K-2, under the umbrella of the preexisting overall profit-sharing agreement with the company. Flooding in the spring of 1954 delayed the project, the line was finished in early September 1954.

The $30 million refinery was built by M. W. Kellog and owned by the government. At the time it satisfied essentially the entire national demand for refined oil products. It included units for thermal cracking, kerosine treatment and gasoline treatment and a steam and electric power generation unit. The refinery began operations in June 1955. Rated at 6,500 bbl/d gasoline, 3,450 bbl/d kerosine and 3,900 bbl/d fuel oil from a supply of 24,000 bbl/d of crude oil, in the first few months of operation it achieved up to 27,000 bbl/d. At the end of 1955, Foster Wheeler was constructing a 25,000 tons/year lubricants plant at the refinery site.

=== Bai Hassan ===
The Bai Hassan field began production in June 1960. It was connected to K-1 via a 20-mile 12-inch line.

== Cathodic Protection ==
Leaks in the 12-inch line
| 1945 | 55 |
| 1946 | 44 |
| 1947 | 24 |
| 1948 | 24 |
| 1949 | 53 |
| 1950 | 73 |
| 1951 | 31 |
| 1952 | 109 |
| 1953 | 80 |
| 1954 | 68 |
| 1955 | 31 |
| 1956 | 85 |
| 1957 | 325 |
| 1958 | 104 |
| 1959 | 60 |
| 1960 | 56 |

Approximately at the laying of the 30-inch pipe, cathodic protection was for the first time made part of the pipeline system. The Westinghouse Brake and Signal Co., Ltd. provided combination units of a transformer and a selenium rectifier housed in a common cooling oil bath, the whole device bulky enough to require a ladder to reach the top. Each unit could provide a maximum of 40 Amperes at the maximum 50 Volts and an overall maximum current of 45A. A particular current setting was selected (depending on soil conditions) and that constant current maintained by an internal regulator. The rectifiers were installed at intervals of 5 to 10 miles.

A pair of aluminum wires originating at pumping stations were suspended from the telephone masts to distribute 11kV single phase AC current to the rectifiers. When analyzed it was found that this protection was not performing miracles, as expected for desert conditions where infrequent rain tends to produce inhomogeneous concentration of salts near the surface. While on average only 0.2 to 0.5 Amperes per mile were required for the new 30-inch line, for the 16-inch line this was 2 to 4 Amps and for the old 12-inch line the figure was 4 to 10 Amperes, even though the latter had the smallest exposed surface area per mile. The investigation also included a tally of recorded leaks for the 12-inch line (note the peak in 1957 due to repressurization stresses after the month long Suez Crisis shutdown).

The IPC had sent a representative on a tour of United States corrosion laboratories in 1947.

== See also ==
- Trans-Arabian Pipeline
