= Fremington, Devon =

Village in Devon, England

Coordinates: 51°04′19″N 4°07′38″W

Fremington
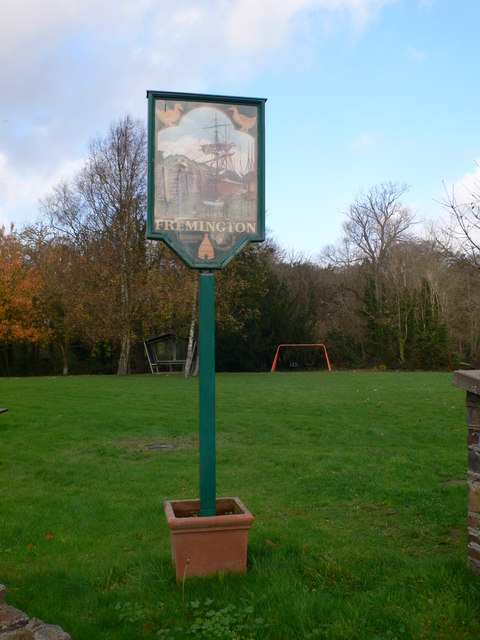
- Sign on the village green

- Location within Devon
- Population: 5,231 2021 census
- District: North Devon
- Shire county: Devon
- Region: South West
- Country: England
- Sovereign state: United Kingdom
- Post town: BARNSTAPLE
- Postcode district: EX31
- Police: Devon and Cornwall
- Fire: Devon and Somerset
- Ambulance: South Western

Fremington is a large village, civil parish and former manor in North Devon, England, the historic centre of which is situated three miles (5 km) west of Barnstaple. The village lies between the south bank of the tidal estuary of the River Taw and a small inlet of that river known as Fremington Pill. The parish is surrounded clockwise from the north by the parishes of Heanton Punchardon, Ashford, West Pilton, Barnstaple, Tawstock, Horwood, Lovacott and Newton Tracey, and Instow.

Fremington Quay was formerly a port on the River Taw, one-half mile (800 m) north of the village centre. Fremington was formerly a borough which sent members to Parliament in the reign of King Edward III (1327–77). The parish includes the neighbouring former hamlets (greatly expanded in the 20th century) of Bickington to the east and Yelland to the west. It has many public woodland and even coastal walks.

Fremington, Bickington and Yelland, all on the B3223 main road from Barnstaple to Instow have, according to Hoskins (1959), been spoilt by almost uninterrupted ribbon-building to provide housing for commuters to Barnstaple, but some old houses survive near the parish church.

== History ==
Fremington hundred was one of the 32 historic hundreds of Devon. Owing to its quay and right to hold certain fairs or markets, it was briefly a borough that sent members to Parliament in the reign of Edward III.

The manor of Fremington was held by the Acland family of Barnstaple, a junior branch of the Acland Baronets of Killerton in Devon and Holnicote in Somerset, which originated in the 12th century at the estate of Acland, Landkey in North Devon, and which by the 19th century was one of the largest landowners in the Southwest of England. It passed to Richard II who granted it to his half-brother John Holland, Earl of Huntingdon. Following Holland's execution in January 1400 for his rebellion against Henry IV, who had usurped the throne from Richard, the keeping of the manor of Fremington was given in May 1400 to John Stourton (died 1438) of Preston Plucknett in Somerset, 7 times MP for Somerset, together with William Yerde, MP.

== Demography ==
The population of Fremington, according to the census of 1801, was 875. This number increased gradually in the forty years to 1841, to 1,326 however the rate of increase slowed during the next 10 years and coinciding with the arrival of the railway fell from 1,351 in 1851 to 1,194 in 1901 and slightly lower in 1931. Population growth resumed after World War II and saw more than a doubling between 1961 and 2011, to 4,310 people. Data for 1801–1961 is available at Britain Through Time. The 2001 and 2011 Censuses give detailed information about the village.

Population of Fremington
Year	1801	1811	1821	1831	1841	1851	1881	1891	1901
Population	875	941	1,099	1,180	1,326	1,350	1,235	1,195	1,194
Year	1911	1921	1931	1941	1951	1961	2001	2011	2021
Population	1,200	1,120	1,172	n/a	2,734	4,409	3,923	4,310	5,231

The 1848 Samuel Lewis national survey shows the parish had 6,810 acres (2,760 ha), of which 999 acres (404 ha) were waste or common land.

The number of dwellings in the village was relatively static between the first Ordnance Survey series in the 1880s until World War II. Fremington has since multiplied in population. By 2001, the population of the village (rather than the parish) was approximately 4,250.

== Fremington Manor ==
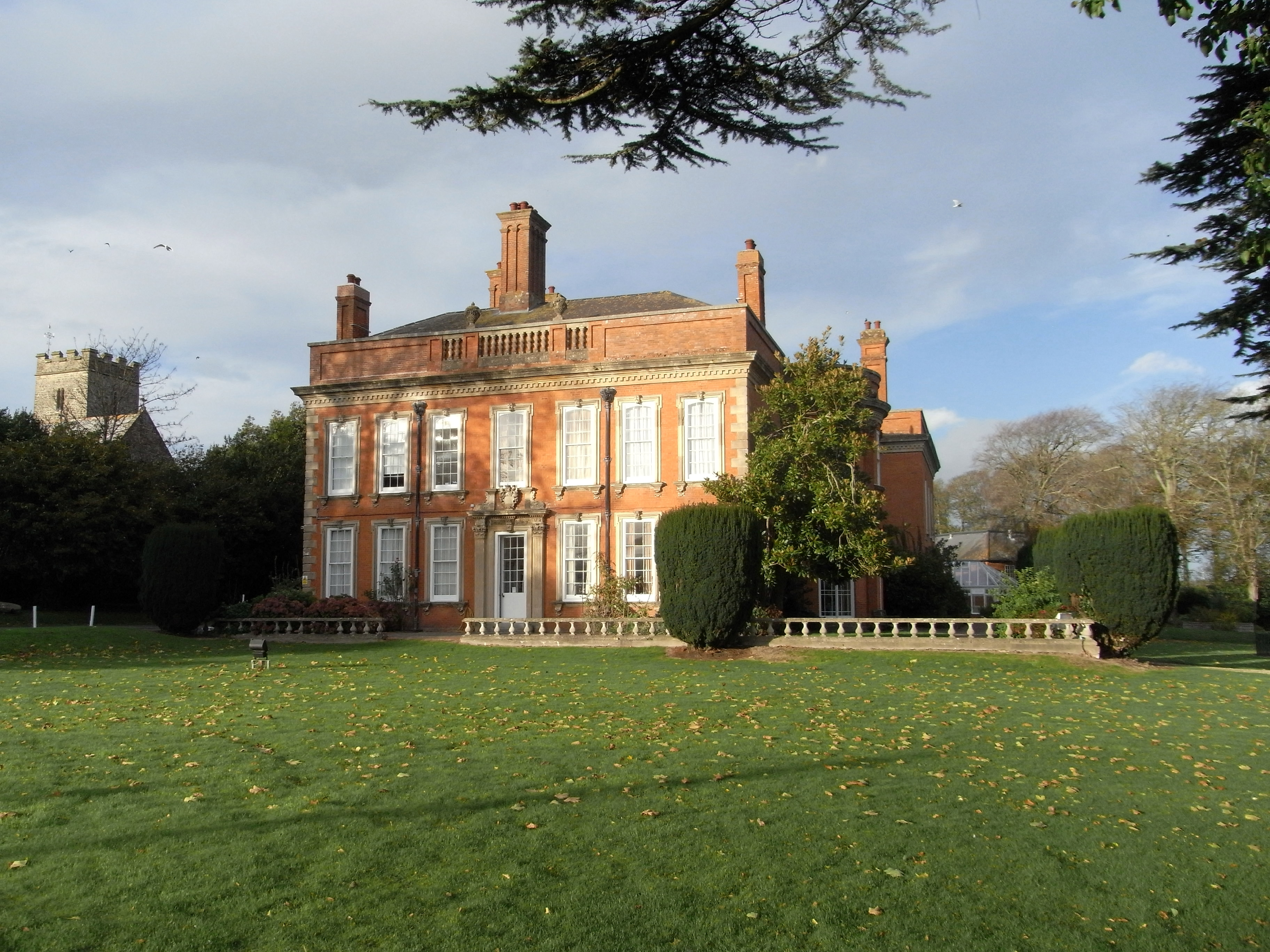
Fremington Manor, south front, with St Peter's Parish Church visible to west (left).

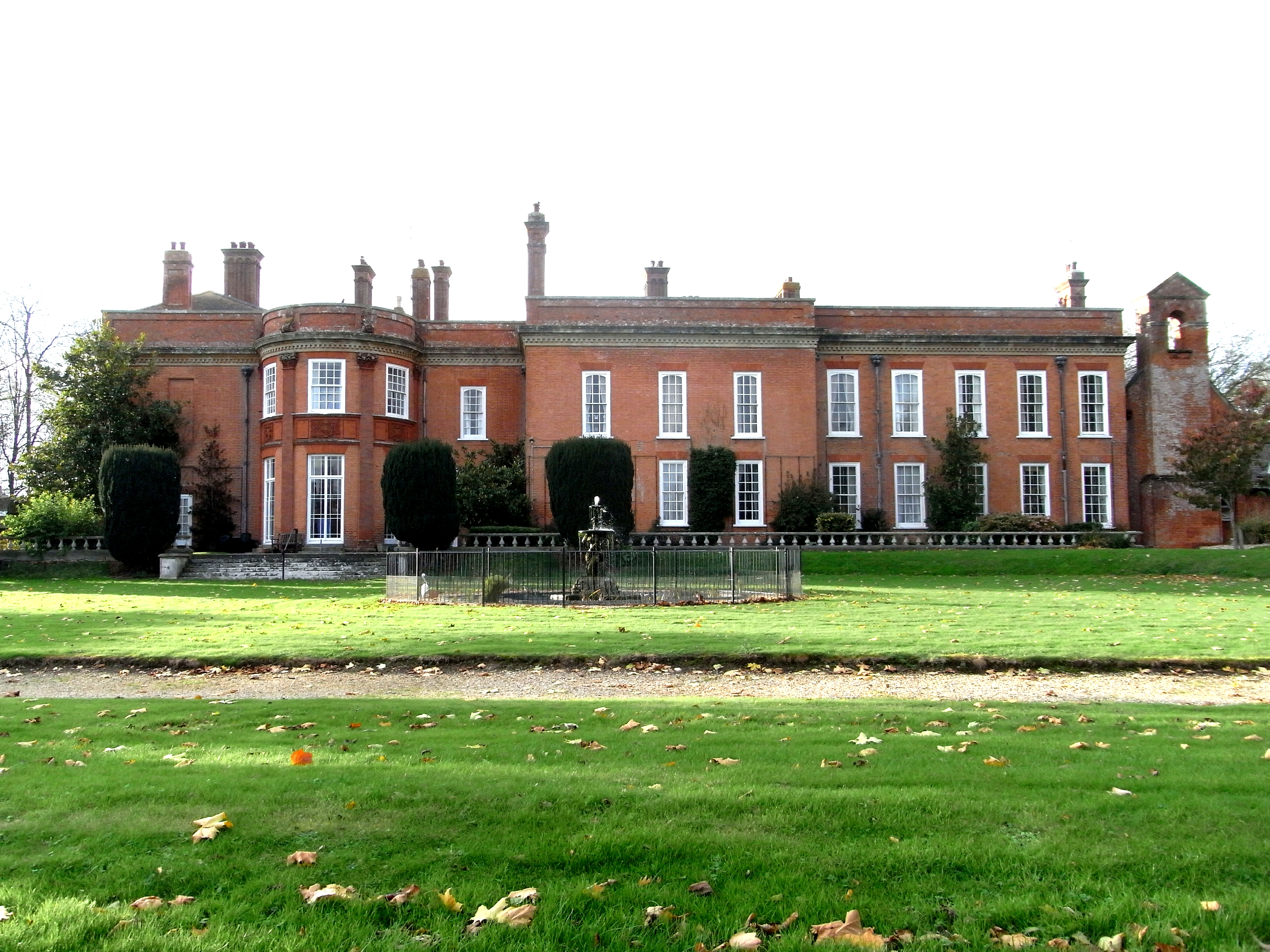
Fremington Manor, east front.

The large early Georgian red-brick mansion known as Fremington Manor, situated 50 metres east of St Peter's Church, and clearly visible from the main road, is the former manor house built by Richard II Acland (1679–1729), MP for Barnstaple 1708–13. It was re-modelled in the 19th century by his eventual heirs the Arundell-Yeo family, who added a bow window which displays on three large terracotta relief panels the arms of Acland, Barbor and Yeo quartering Arundell.

Between 1943 and 1945 Fremington Manor and grounds was used by the US army as "Fremington Training Camp", a hospital and rehabilitation centre. On the departure of the US Army in 1945, the house and grounds were used by the British Army as the "School of Combined Operations", commanded by an admiral. In the late 1950s it was used by amphibious squadrons of the Royal Army Service Corps and Royal Corps of Transport. The mansion house served as the officers mess of 18 Company (Amphibian). In the 1970s it served as an army training camp. In 1980 Fremington Manor was sold by the army and became a nursing home. The army camp, which occupied about 50 acres (20 ha) of land, remained, but closed on 1 October 2009 when it was no longer economically viable to keep open, as it was hardly used outside the summer months.

== Clay works ==
Fremington is famous for "Fishley Pottery", made by the family of that name in the Combrew area, examples of which are in the collection of the Museum of Barnstaple and North Devon. Excellent, stone-free clay pits (now mainly worked out) exist in the eastern half of the parish and were also owned by Brannam Pottery and used for their "Barum Ware". The clay may have formed in varve lakes, near an ice deposit which lay over Fremington during the Last Glacial Maximum or previous glaciations such as the Anglian (MIS12) or the Wolstonian glaciation (MIS6) Unusually, glacial deposits are found here in the county of Devon. Two patches of boulder clay lie over the centre of the parish's bedrock. The next nearest boulder clay deposits are in the Gower Peninsula, South Wales, approximately 45 miles (72 km) due north of Fremington across the Bristol Channel. The nearest deposit of boulder clay in England is in the central Cotswolds, 6 miles (10 km) due east of Bourton-on-the-Water and approximately 140 miles (230 km) north-east of Fremington. The existence of the boulder clay is puzzling as the southernmost limit of the Devensian glaciation is believed to have been located over South Wales. There are few other signs of glaciation in North Devon to support an extension to a more southerly limit. It has been suggested that the surface covering was in some way attached to an ice-mass that drifted across the Bristol Channel and deposited the till over Fremington. However, this does not fully explain the presence of the nearly co-located varve clay beds.

== Fremington Quay ==
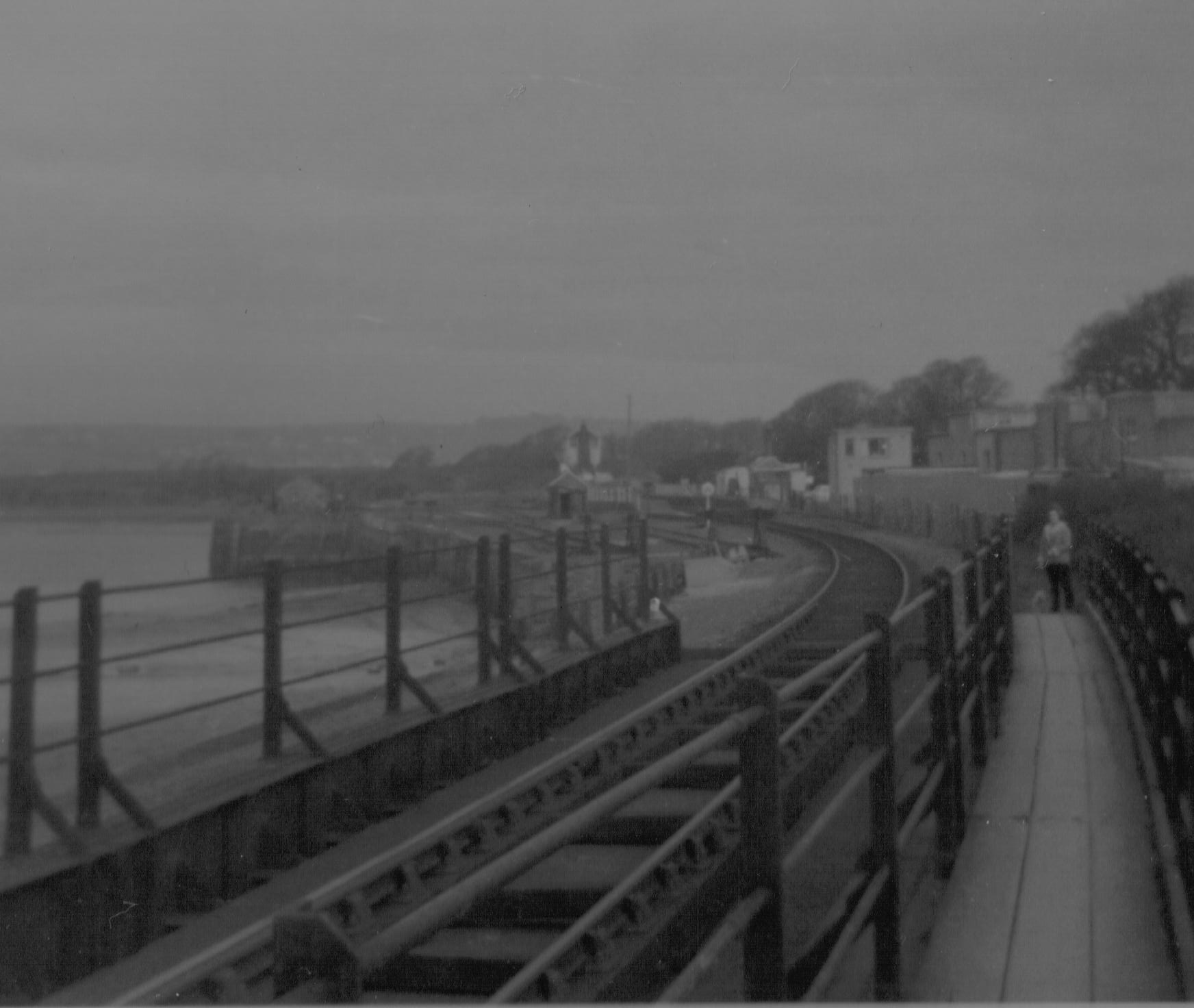
Fremington station and quay in 1970 shortly after the steam cranes were removed

Fremington Quay was once significant in the import and export of many goods. It had railway sidings, cranes, and other apparatus used for the export of ball clay and import of coal. Between the early to mid-twentieth century it was the busiest port (based on tonnage) between Bristol and Land's End. An abattoir was formerly located here. The quay has been redeveloped as an amenity facility with restaurant and provides wide views over the River Taw estuary. It has been a Conservation Area since 1996.

== Transport ==
The A39 trunk road, which forms the main route to north-west Devon and north-east Cornwall, was diverted 2 miles (3.2 km) south of the village in 1989, relieving the village of its annual summer traffic jams.

Fremington is served by Stagecoach Devon 21/21A – The North Devon Wave – Barnstaple – Bideford, Westward Ho! and Appledore, and Stagecoach Devon 5B – Barnstaple – Exeter.

== Education ==
The West Fremington Presbyterian School for Boys was set up in 1873 by Presbyterian minister The Reverend William Morgan Topps with the assistance of his father, local landowner William Desmond Topps. The old school house was sold by Devon County Council in 1982 and converted to private dwelling. The school, that exists today as Fremington Community Primary & Nursery School, is near the centre of the post-war village expansion.

== Culture ==
The Fremington great meat pie is described in a song included in Devon Tradition (Topic Records 12TS349), 1979. Sporting and open land facilities are provided by Fremington civil (administrative) parish council across all of the localities of the village, as well as having a village hall that may be hired by any of the residents of the whole parish. Allied is a Community Group who engage in charitable fundraising. The 1st Fremington Air Scouts group is also in the village.

== Commercial premises ==
Fremington has two public houses, The Fox and the New Inn, situated almost next door to each other.

Little Bridge House in the village is a children's hospice run by Children's Hospice South West.

== St Peter's Church ==
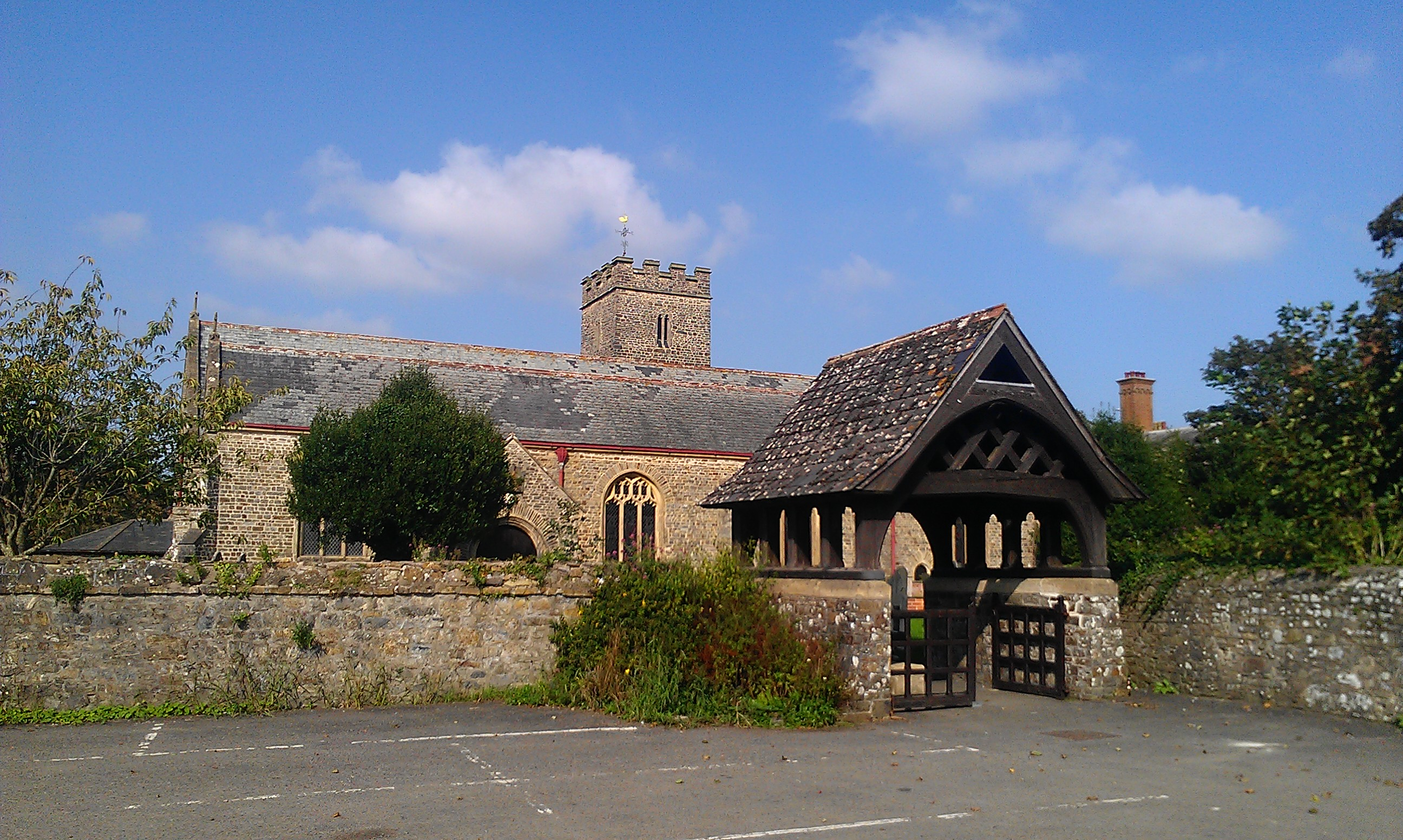
The parish church of St Peter in Fremington

The parish church St Peter's was subject to thorough Victorian restoration in 1867 to the designs of the leading architect Sir George Gilbert Scott. The stone pulpit was buried during the Reformation and retains traces of its original colour. St Peter's medieval tower unusually is positioned at the east end of the church, to the north of the chancel.

== Sport ==
A greyhound racing track was opened by the Barnstaple & District Greyhound Racing Club on 6 February 1937 at Tews Lane, Bickington. The racing was independent (not affiliated to the sports governing body the National Greyhound Racing Club) and known as a flapping track, which was the nickname given to independent tracks. Racing over 340 yards (310 m) and 400 yards (370 m) continued for just two more years with winter breaks in 1937 and 1938.

== Railway ==
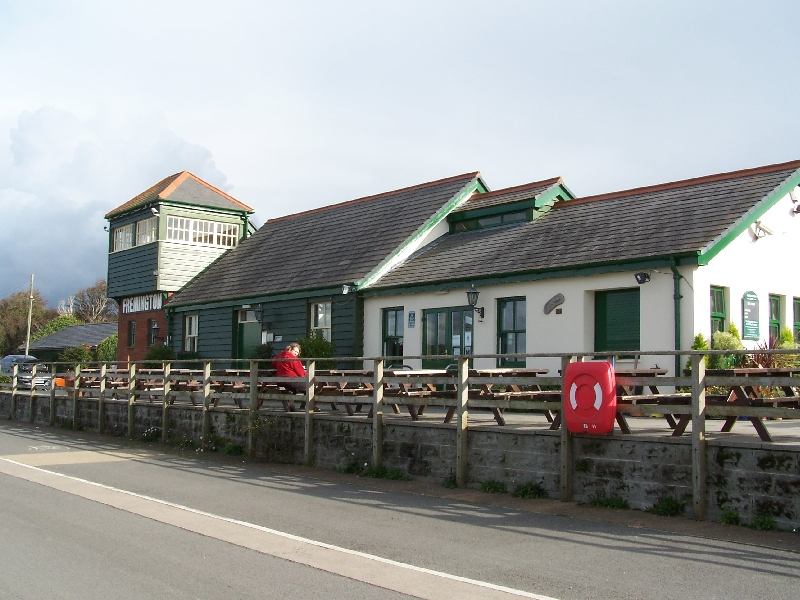
Fremington railway station in 2008.

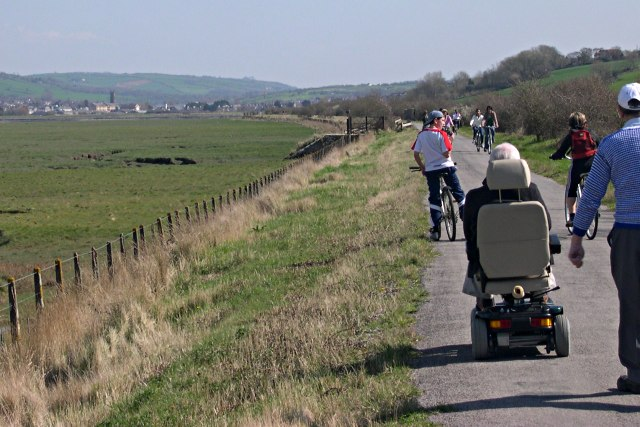
The Tarka Trail is a direct part-coastal path following the former railway

The Tarka Trail cycle track (also part of the South West Coast Path), which follows the course of the railway from Barnstaple to Torrington, passes over Fremington Pill via the old London and South Western Railway iron bridge (railway line closed 1982; dismantled 1987) at Fremington Quay on the old Barnstaple to Torrington railtrack bed. The original railway was first planned in an Act of Parliament in 1838, and laid in 1846 connecting the Penhill with Barnstaple at a cost of £20 000. A number of boats are moored here (in the Pill). The 'Quay Cafe' is located here. Whilst rather charmingly built in the style of a railway station, it is not the original one which was located the other side of the Tarka Trail where an original platform still exists. Other features around the Pill include a couple of lime kilns, now thoroughly fenced off to prevent accidents. The station was one stop after the still active railway station of Barnstaple, to which Fremington is linked directly by the wide scenic path described instead.

== Army camp ==
Fremington Army Camp was located here to be within easy marching distance (800 m) from the railway station at the Quay. The site was used by the US Army's 313th Station Hospital for post-D-Day rehabilitation, with room for 2,000 patients. It started receiving casualties on 20 July 1944.

It economically was complemented by the still current Marines and Air Force presence at Royal Marines Base Chivenor, one mile (2 km) northwards on the opposite bank of the River Taw, and the Amphibious Trials and Training Unit of the Royal Marines at Arromanches Camp, Instow, 2 miles (3 km) to the west. The camp was closed in autumn 2009 and between the years of 2015 and 2020 was redeveloped into the Riverside Park and Water's Edge estates.
