= Children's Hospice South West =

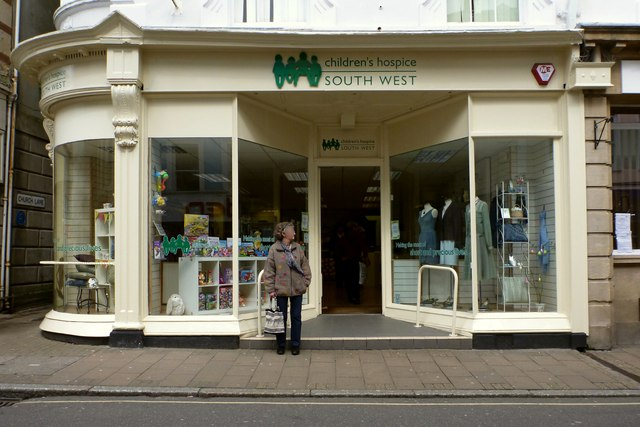
- CHSW shop in Barnstaple
- Abbreviation: CHSW
- Formation: 1991
- Founder: Jill and Eddie Farwell
- Type: Charity
- Purpose: Provides palliative, respite, end-of-life and bereavement care for life limited children and their families from South West England
- Headquarters: Fremington
- Location: Barnstaple
- Region served: South West England
- Budget: £9.3 million (2020)
- Revenue: £15.8 million (2020)
- Staff: 377 (2020)
- Volunteers: 900 (2020)
- Website: www.chsw.org.uk

Children's Hospice South West (CHSW) is a registered charity that provides palliative, respite, end of life and bereavement care for life-limited and terminally ill children and their families from the South West England region. It oversees three of the 41 children's hospices in the United Kingdom.

== History ==
CHSW was founded by Jill and Eddie Farwell in 1991, after spending many years travelling to Helen & Douglas House in Oxford with their own two life-limited children. Following a feasibility study, they raised funds and Little Bridge House at Fremington near Barnstaple in North Devon opened in 1995, and instantly provided support for up to 200 families in the South West with life limited children.

The second hospice, Charlton Farm at Wraxall, North Somerset near Bristol, opened its doors to the first families in April 2007.

The third hospice, Little Harbour, opened at Porthpean, St Austell, Cornwall in 2011. It offers a more local service to families from Cornwall and Plymouth. Children's Hospice South West's £5 million Precious Lives Appeal was set up to fund the building of this third hospice.

== Finances ==
In the year ending March 2020, CHSW's income was £15.8 million, which included £2.6M of government contracts and grants. It spent £5.8M on raising funds and £9.3M on running the hospices.
