= Fremington Army Camp =

Fremington Army Camp
- Near Fremington in England
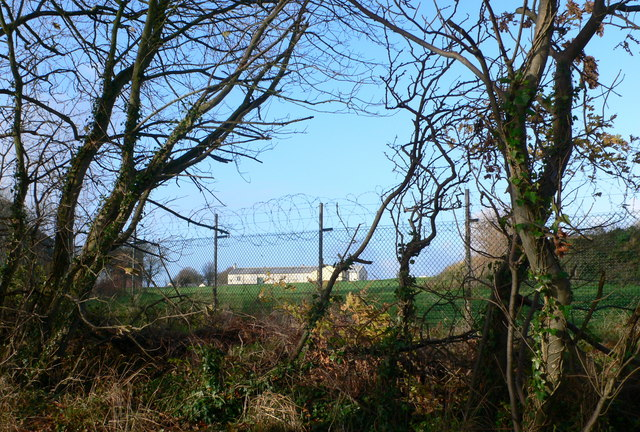

Site information
- Type: Army Camp
- Owner: Ministry of Defence
- Operator: Royal Navy
- Open to the public: No

Location
- Shown within Devon
- Coordinates: 51°04′31″N 004°07′31″W

Site history
- Built: 1942
- Built for: United States Army
- In use: 1943-2009
- Fate: Closed

Fremington Army Camp was a military camp in the village of Fremington, Devon, England, which was used as a base to train the United States Army Air Corps. It was originally located there to be within easy marching distance from the railway station at the Quay.

== History ==
The site was used by the US Army's 313th Station Hospital for post-D-Day rehabilitation, with room for 2,000 patients and started receiving casualties on 20 July 1944, during the Second World War. It became home to the School of Combined Operations in 1946. It then became home to 18 Squadron Royal Army Service Corps and its successor, 18 (Amphibious) Squadron Royal Corps of Transport.

It complemented the work of the Commando Logistic Regiment at RM Chivenor, situated a mile (2 km) northwards on the opposite bank of the River Taw, and of 11 (Amphibious Trials and Training) Squadron at RM Instow, 2.0 miles (3.2 km) to the west. In 2009, the camp was closed due to its severely outdated nature, and the opportunity to re-develop the land.

== Current use ==
In 2015 Barratt Developments and Bovis Homes started development of the site into what is now known as the Riverside Park and Water's Edge estates. The estates have a grass football pitch, two community buildings a play park and a MUGA (Multi-Use Games Area). The Fremington Riverside Park Water’s Edge Residents Association has stated that residents are paying extra maintenance for these facilities, despite being told when they bought their homes that the council would be paying for them.

In June 2021 Stanley Wallis, an 11 year old boy, found a live Second World War hand grenade on the estate. The police and Royal Navy were called and assisted Wallis to detonate it in a controlled explosion at Fremington Quay.
