= H-2 Air Base =

Located in Southern Iraq

- Al-Anbar Province, Iraq
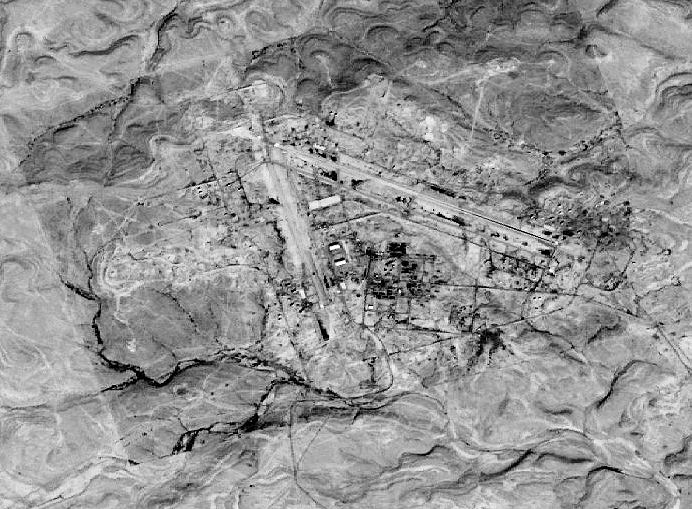
- H-2 Air Base, 1995

Site information
- Condition: Abandoned

Location
- Location of H-2 Air Base
- Coordinates: 33°21′22″N 040°35′47″E

Site history
- Built: 1935
- In use: 1935–2003
- Battles/wars: World War II; Operation Desert Storm; Operation Iraqi Freedom

Garrison information
- Garrison: Royal Air Force (1935–1958); Iraqi Air Force (1958–2003); Coalition Forces (2003)

Airfield information
Runways
Direction	Length and surface
11/29	12,600 ft (closed) Concrete
16/34	8,800 ft (closed) Concrete

H-2 Air Base (code-named 202B) is a former Iraqi Air Force base in the Al-Anbar Governorate of Iraq. It was captured by U.S.-led Coalition forces during Operation Iraqi Freedom in 2003.

== Overview ==
H-2 is located in southern Iraq approximately 350 kilometers (217 mi) west of Baghdad. The airfield is served by two runways 12,600 and 8,800 feet long. H-2 occupies a 41 sq km (15.8 sq mi) site and is protected by 26 km (16.1 mi) of security perimeter.

== History ==
=== RAF H2 ===
H-2 was established by the Royal Air Force as a landing ground as "RAF H2" in the 1930s. It was named for the nearby H2 pumping station on the Mosul–Haifa oil pipeline. H2 one of several airfields established as part of the British Mandate of Iraq. Iraq was artificially created at the close of World War I from the former Ottoman Empire as part of the 1919 Treaty of Versailles. It was used until the 1940s by No. 84 Squadron RAF.

During the early days World War II, the airfield was abandoned as the RAF moved its units to RAF Habbaniya during the 1941 Iraqi coup d'état and subsequent Anglo-Iraqi War. It may have been used by some German Luftwaffe units that had moved in from Vichy French controlled Syria, during an attempted coups by German-leaning Iraqi Generals who had engineered a coup in Iraq on 31 March 1941. However, the British moved in both land reinforcements from British Palestine and flew in some Wellington and Blenheim bombers to RAF Habbaniya. The coup crumbled in disorder, with the pro-Nazi forces in Iraq surrendering on 30 May. The Luftwaffe units stranded in Iraq retreated back to Syria. Outnumbered at least three to one, using outmoded equipment and facing the best of Nazi Germany's air power, the British still managed to conquer Iraq in less than four weeks. It was the first time the Luftwaffe had been beaten in World War II.

=== Iraqi Air Force ===
The airfield remained under British control until 1958, as a result of the 14 July 1958 Iraqi Revolution when Hashemite monarchy established by King Faisal I of Iraq in 1921 under the auspices of the British was overthrown. Subsequently, it was turned over to the Iraqi Air Force. During the 1970s, it was one of several Iraqi airfields upgraded under project "Super-Base" in response to the experiences from Arab-Israeli wars in 1967 and 1973.

Companies from Yugoslavia – previously engaged in building bridges in Iraq – became involved in airfield construction. Due to their specific construction of these airfields – which included taxi-ways leading right out of Hardened Aircraft Shelters (HAS) and laid diagonally to the runways – they became known as "Trapezoids" or "Yugos".

The facilities were divided into two categories: "surface" and "underground". The "surface" facilities were actually the "softest", and included maintenance hangars of metal construction, and HAS of concrete construction. In total, the Yugoslavs have built no less but 200 HAS on different airfields in Iraq during the 1980s.

The protection of each HAS consisted of one meter thick concrete shells, reinforced by 30 cm thick steel plates. There was only one entrance and this was covered by sliding doors, made of 50 cm thick steel armoured plate and concrete. The HAS' were usually built in small groups – seldom more than five, with each group sharing the same water and power supply, each HAS having its own backup gasoline-powered electrical generator, and each HAS being equipped with a semi-automatic aircraft-refuelling system.

In addition, underground facilities that could shelter between four and ten aircraft on average were constructed. In order to build these the Yugoslavs used equipment and construction techniques identical to that use in underground oil-storage depots, additionally concealing the extension and the true purpose of the whole project. The underground facilities were all hardened to withstand a direct hit by a tactical nuclear bomb, buried up to 50 meters below the ground and consisted of the main aircraft "hangar" (consisting of two floors in several cases, connected by 40ts hydraulic lifts), connected with operations, maintenance, and logistical facilities via a net of underground corridors.

=== 1991 Gulf War ===
H-2 became an important target for American F-117 "Stealth" fighter attacks in the opening days of the Gulf war, according to military analysts. The U.S. conducted some 47 raids on the base, effectively closing it for the duration of the war.

=== 2003 Iraq War ===
On 18 March 2003, a combined force of B and D squadron of British 22nd SAS Regiment and 1 squadron of the Australian SASR crossed the Iraqi-Jordanian border and headed towards H-2. The combined force took H-2 virtually unopposed, a company of U.S. Army Rangers and Marines from 45 Commando flew from Jordan to the base, where the SAS/SASR handed the base over to their control.
