= Structure of the British Armed Forces =

This is the structure of the British Armed Forces.

== Ministry of Defence ==
- Ministry of Defence, at Main Building, Whitehall
  - Secretary of State for Defence
    - Minister of State for Defence Procurement and Industry
    - Minister of State for Defence
    - Parliamentary Under-Secretary of State for the Armed Forces
    - Parliamentary Under-Secretary of State for Defence People and Veterans
  - Defence Council of the United Kingdom
    - Defence Board
    - Admiralty Board
    - Army Board
    - Air Force Board
  - Chiefs of Staff Committee
    - Chief of the Defence Staff
      - Deputy Chief of the Defence Staff (Military Strategy and Operations)
      - Deputy Chief of the Defence Staff (Financial and Military Capability)
      - Chief of Defence People
    - Vice-Chief of the Defence Staff
      - Defence Futures and Force Design, MOD Shrivenham - tasking and direction (admin under C&SOC)
    - First Sea Lord and Chief of the Naval Staff
    - Chief of the General Staff
    - Chief of the Air Staff
    - Commander Strategic Command

=== Defence Infrastructure Organisation ===
- Headquarters, Defence Infrastructure Organisation, at DMS Whittington
  - Ministry of Defence Guard Service
  - Northern Ireland Security Guard Service
  - Defence Fire and Rescue Service, at Marlborough Lines
  - Defence Training Estate, at Waterloo Lines
    - Headquarters, Defence Training Estate Wales & West Midlands, at Sennybridge Training Area
    - Headquarters, Defence Training Estate South East, at Hythe
    - Headquarters, Defence Training Estate South West, at Wyvern Barracks
    - Headquarters, Defence Training Estate North East, at Wathgill Camp
    - Headquarters, Defence Training Estate North West, at Warcop Training Area
    - Headquarters, Defence Training Estate East, at West Tofts Camp
    - Headquarters, Defence Training Estate Scotland, at Forthside Barracks
    - Headquarters, Salisbury Plain Training Area, at Westdown Camp

=== Defence Equipment and Support ===
- Headquarters, Defence Equipment and Support, at MoD Abbey Wood
  - British Forces Post Office, at RAF Northolt
  - Defence Equipment Sales Authority, at MoD Bicester
  - Defence Standardization, at Kentigern House, Glasgow
  - Defence Munitions
    - RNAD Coulport
    - DM Crombie
    - DM Beith
    - DM Plymouth
    - DM Glen Douglas
    - DM Gosport
    - DM Kineton

=== Defence Science and Technology Laboratory ===
- Headquarters, Defence Science and Technology Laboratory, at Porton Down
  - DSTL Portsdown West
    - Defence Wargaming Centre
  - DSTL Alverstoke
  - DSTL Newcastle

=== Ministry of Defence Police ===
- Headquarters, Ministry of Defence Police, at RAF Wyton
  - Criminal Investigation Department
  - Nuclear Guard Force
  - Special Escort Group, at AWE Aldermaston
  - Operational Support Units
    - Operational Support Unit North
    - Operational Support Unit South
  - Central Support Groups
    - Central Support Group Aldershot
    - Central Support Group Bicester
    - Central Support Group Menwith Hill

=== Defence Safety Authority ===
- Headquarters, Defence Safety Authority, at Main Building, Whitehall
  - Military Aviation Authority, at MoD Abbey Wood
  - Military Air Accident Investigation Branch
  - Land Accident Prevention and Investigation Team
  - Defence Nuclear Safety Regulator
  - Defence Maritime Regulator
  - Defence Ordnance, Munitions and Explosives Safety Regulator
  - Defence Land Systems Safety Regulator
    - Land Systems Safety Regulator
    - Defence Movement and Transport Safety Regulator
    - Defence Fuel and Gas Safety Regulator
    - Defence Fire Safety Regulator

=== Defence Nuclear Organisation ===
- Headquarters, Defence Nuclear Organisation, at Main Building, Whitehall
  - Warhead Directorate

=== Defence Business Services ===
- Headquarters, Defence Business Services, at MoD Abbey Wood
  - DBS Civilian HR

=== Defence Electronics and Components Agency ===
- Headquarters, Defence Electronics and Components Agency, at MoD Sealand

=== Oil and Pipelines Agency ===
- Headquarters, Oil and Pipelines Agency, at Petty France, Westminster
  - Campbeltown Oil Fuel Depot
  - Garelochhead Oil Fuel Depot, at HMNB Clyde
  - Gosport Oil Fuel Depot, at HMNB Portsmouth
  - Loch Ewe Oil Fuel Depot
  - Loch Striven Oil Fuel Depot
  - Thanckes Oil Fuel Depot, at HMNB Devonport
  - Plumley and Cape of Good Hope (oil storage)

=== United Kingdom Hydrographic Office ===
- Headquarters, United Kingdom Hydrographic Office, at Taunton

=== Submarine Delivery Agency ===
- Headquarters, Submarine Delivery Agency, at MOD Abbey Wood

=== Service Prosecuting Authority ===
- Headquarters, Service Prosecuting Authority, at RAF Northolt

=== Non-departmental Organisations ===
- Armed Forces Covenant Fund Trust
- Single Source Regulations Office, at Finlaison House, London
- Advisory Committee on Conscientious Objectors
- Armed Forces' Pay Review Body
- Defence Nuclear Safety Committee
- Independent Medical Expert Group
- Nuclear Research Advisory Council
- Scientific Advisory Committee on the Medical Implications of Less-Lethal Weapons
- Defence Science Expert Committee
- Veterans Advisory and Pensions Committees
- Advisory Group on Military Medicine
- Defence and Security Media Advisory Committee
- Service Complaints Ombudsman
- United Kingdom Reserve Forces Association
- National Army Museum, at Royal Hospital Road, Chelsea
- National Museum of the Royal Navy
  - National Museum of the Royal Navy Hartlepool, at Jackson Dock, Hartlepool
  - National Museum of the Royal Navy, Portsmouth, at HMNB Portsmouth
  - Royal Marines Museum, at HMNB Portsmouth
  - Royal Navy Submarine Museum, Gosport
  - Fleet Air Arm Museum, at RNAS Yeovilton
  - Explosion! Museum of Naval Firepower, at Gosport
- Royal Air Force Museum
  - Royal Air Force Museum London, at Hendon Aerodrome
  - Royal Air Force Museum Cosford, at RAF Cosford

=== Reserve Forces and Cadets Association ===
- East Anglia Reserve Forces and Cadets Association
- East Midlands Reserve Forces and Cadets Association
- Greater London Reserve Forces and Cadets Association
- Highland Reserve Forces and Cadets Association
- Lowland Reserve Forces and Cadets Association
- Northern Ireland Reserve Forces and Cadets Association
- North of England Reserve Forces and Cadets Association
- North West of England and Isle of Man Reserve Forces and Cadets Association
- South East Reserve Forces and Cadets Association
- Wales Reserve Forces and Cadets Association
- Wessex Reserve Forces and Cadets Association
- West Midlands Reserve Forces and Cadets Association
- Yorkshire and the Humber Reserve Forces and Cadets Association

== Cyber & Specialist Operations Command ==
- Headquarters, Cyber & Specialist Operations Command, at Northwood Headquarters, Eastbury
  - Defence Digital, at MoD Corsham
    - ISS Boddington
  - Joint Arms Control Implementation Group, at RAF Henlow
  - Development, Concepts and Doctrine Centre, at MoD Shrivenham

=== Permanent Joint Operating Bases ===
- British Forces Cyprus
  - Joint Service Signal Unit (Cyprus), at Ayios Nikolaos Station
  - Cyprus Communications Unit, at RAF Akrotiri
  - Cyprus Operations Support Unit, at RAF Akrotiri
  - Cyprus Joint Police Unit, at Episkopi Cantonment
  - Joint Services Health Unit, at RAF Akrotiri
  - No. 84 Squadron RAF, at RAF Akrotiri (Search and Rescue)
  - Roulement Infantry Battalion
  - Roulement Infantry Battalion
  - Cyprus Military Working Dog Troop, at Episkopi Cantonment
  - Sovereign Base Areas Police, HQ at Episkopi Cantonment
- British Forces South Atlantic Islands, at RAF Mount Pleasant
  - Naval Party 2010, at Mare Harbour
  - HMS Forth, at Mare Harbour
  - Roulement Infantry Company (RIC)
  - Resident Sky Sabre Battery (RSSB)
  - Falkland Islands Joint Logistics Unit
  - Resident Engineer Unit
  - Falkland Islands Support Unit
  - Joint Communications Unit Falkland Islands
  - Joint Services Explosive Ordnance Disposal Unit
  - Joint Services Provost and Security Unit
  - Joint Services Signals Unit
  - No. 905 Expeditionary Air Wing RAF
    - No. 1312 Flight RAF, (A400M Atlas, Voyager KC2)
    - No. 1435 Flight RAF, (Eurofighter Typhoon)
- British Forces Gibraltar
  - Royal Gibraltar Regiment, at Devil's Tower Camp
  - Gibraltar Squadron, RN, at Port of Gibraltar
  - RAF Gibraltar
  - Joint Provost and Security Unit, at Gibdock
  - Gibraltar Defence Police, at Gibdock
- British Forces British Indian Ocean Territories, at Diego Garcia
  - Naval Party 1002, at Diego Garcia

=== Defence Intelligence ===
- Headquarters, Defence Intelligence, at Main Building, Whitehall,
  - Joint Forces Cyber Group
    - Joint Cyber Unit (Reserve), at Northwood Headquarters
      - Reserve Cyber Unit, Royal Naval Reserve
      - No. 600 (City of London) Squadron RAuxAF, at RAF Northolt
      - No. 614 (County of Glamorgan) Squadron RAuxAF, at Cardiff
      - Land Information Assurance Group, (British Army), at MoD Corsham
  - Joint Forces Intelligence Group, at RAF Wyton
    - Defence Intelligence Fusion Centre, at RAF Wyton
    - National Centre for Geospatial Intelligence, at RAF Wyton
    - Defence Geographic Centre, at MoD Feltham
    - Joint Services Signals Organisation, at RAF Digby
    - Defence HUMINT Unit
    - Joint Aeronautical and Geospatial Organisation, at RAF Wyton
    - No. 1 Aeronautical Information Documents Unit
  - Joint Intelligence Training Group, at RAF Chicksands
    - Defence College of Intelligence, at RAF Chicksands
    - Defence School of Photography, at RAF Cosford
    - Royal School of Military Survey, at Denison Barracks

=== Defence Medical Services ===
- Headquarters, Defence Medical Services, at DMS Whittington
  - Surgeon-General of the UK Armed Forces
  - Director of Medical Personnel and Training
    - Royal Centre for Defence Medicine, at Queen Elizabeth Hospital Birmingham
      - Defence School of Healthcare Education, at Queen Elizabeth Hospital Birmingham
      - Defence Medical Academy, at DMS Whittington
  - Director Healthcare Delivery and Training
    - Defence and National Rehabilitation Centre, at Stanford Hall
    - Defence Primary Healthcare
  - Joint Hospital Group
    - James Cook University Hospital, Middlesbrough
    - John Radcliffe Hospital, Oxford
    - Queen Victoria Hospital, East Grinstead
    - Frimley Park Hospital, Frimley
    - Queen Elizabeth Hospital, Birmingham.
    - Queen Alexandra Hospital, Portsmouth
    - Derriford Hospital, Plymouth

=== Directorate of Joint Capability ===
- Headquarters, Joint Capability

=== Directorate of Joint Warfare ===
- Headquarters, Joint Warfare
  - Joint Information Activities Group, at RAF Halton

=== Directorate of Resources and Policy ===
- Headquarters, Resources and Policy

=== Directorate Defence Logistics and Support ===
- Headquarters, Defence Logistics and Support

=== Directorate of Special Forces ===
- Headquarters, United Kingdom Special Forces, at Main Building, Whitehall
  - Special Boat Service, at RM Poole
  - 21 Special Air Service Regiment (Artists) (Reserve), at Regent's Park Barracks
  - 22 Special Air Service Regiment, at Stirling Lines
  - 23 Special Air Service Regiment (Reserve), at Birmingham
  - Special Reconnaissance Regiment, at Stirling Lines
  - Special Forces Support Group, at MOD St Athan
  - 18 (UKSF) Signal Regiment, at Stirling Lines
  - Joint Special Forces Aviation Wing, at RAF Odiham
    - No. 7 Squadron RAF, at RAF Odiham, (Chinook HC6)
    - No. 658 Squadron, AAC, at Stirling Lines, (AS365 Dauphin)
    - Special Forces Flight, No. 47 Squadron RAF, at RAF Brize Norton

=== Defence Academy of the United Kingdom ===
- Headquarters, Defence Academy of the United Kingdom, at MoD Shrivenham
  - Royal College of Defence Studies, at Seaford House
  - Joint Services Command and Staff College, at Watchfield
  - Armed Forces Chaplaincy Centre, at Beckett House, Shrivenham
  - Defence Centre of Training Support, at MoD Shrivenham
  - Defence Technical Undergraduate Scheme
    - Taurus Squadron, at Birmingham, (Aston, Birmingham, and Oxford Universities)
    - Thunderer Squadron, at Southampton, (Southampton and Portsmouth Universities, and Imperial College London)
    - Trojan Squadron, at Newcastle upon Tyne, (Newcastle, Northumbria, and Strathclyde Universities)
    - Typhoon Squadron, at Loughborough, (Loughborough, and Cambridge Universities)
  - Defence Engagement School, at MoD Shrivenham
    - Defence Centre for Languages and Culture, at MoD Shrivenham
    - Defence Attaché and Loan Service Centre, at MoD Shrivenham
  - Nuclear Department, at HMS Sultan
  - Technology School, at MoD Shrivenham
  - Defence Leadership and Business Group, at MoD Shrivenham
  - Centre of Air Safety Training

=== Permanent Joint Headquarters ===
- Permanent Joint Headquarters, at Northwood Headquarters
  - Standing Joint Force Headquarters, at Northwood Headquarters
    - Standing Joint Force Logistics Component Headquarters, at Northwood Headquarters

== Royal Navy ==
- Headquarters, Navy Command, at HMS Excellent, Whale Island
  - First Sea Lord and Chief of the Naval Staff
    - Second Sea Lord and Deputy Chief of Naval Staff
    - Fleet Commander
    - Assistant Chief of the Naval Staff (Policy)
    - Finance Director (Navy)

== British Army ==
- Army Headquarters, at Marlborough Lines
  - Chief of the General Staff
    - Deputy Chief of the General Staff
    - Commander Field Army
    - Commander Home Command
    - Commander Allied Rapid Reaction Corps

== Royal Air Force ==
- Royal Air Force, at RAF High Wycombe
  - Chief of the Air Staff, Air Chief Marshal
    - Assistant Chief of the Air Staff
    - Deputy Commander (Operations)
    - Deputy Commander (Capability)
    - Air Member for Materiel and Chief of Materiel
    - Warrant Officer of the Royal Air Force
