= Special operations =

Specially designated military operations that are considered unconventional

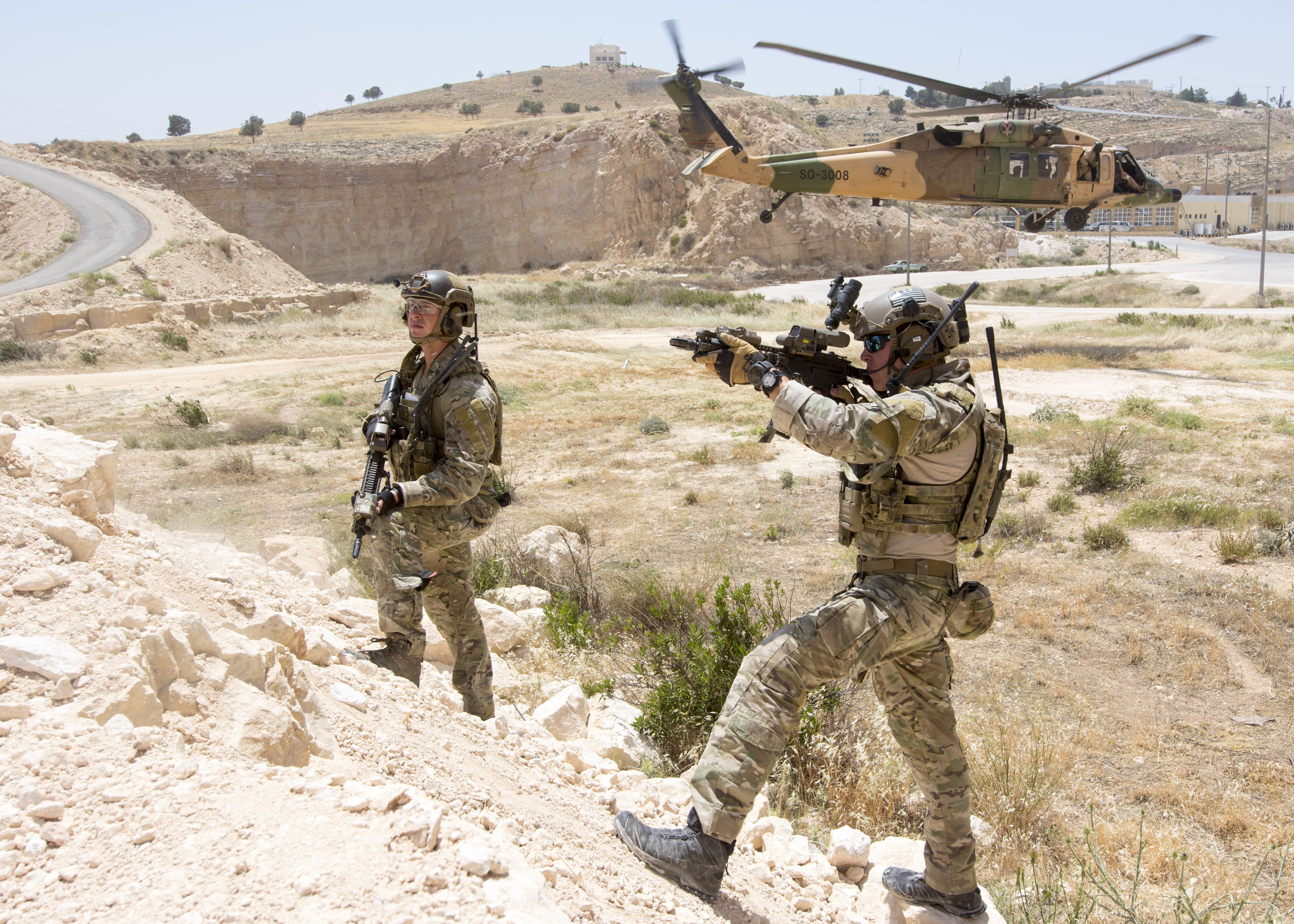
Airmen from the United States Air Force 23rd Special Tactics Squadron operators in MultiCam uniforms training in Jordan

Special operations or special ops are military activities conducted, according to NATO, by "specially designated, organized, selected, trained, and equipped forces using unconventional techniques and modes of employment". Special operations may include reconnaissance, unconventional warfare, and counterterrorism, and are typically conducted by small groups of highly trained personnel, emphasizing sufficiency, stealth, speed, and tactical coordination, commonly known as special forces (SF) or special operations forces (SOF).

== History ==
=== Australia ===
In World War II, following advice from the British, Australia began raising special forces. The first units to be formed were independent companies, which began training at Wilson's Promontory in Victoria in early 1941 under the tutelage of British instructors. With an establishment of 17 officers and 256 men, the independent companies were trained as "stay behind" forces, a role that they were later employed in against the Japanese in the South West Pacific Area during 1942–43, most notably fighting a guerrilla campaign in Timor, as well as actions in New Guinea. In all, a total of eight independent companies were raised before they were reorganized in mid-1943 into commando squadrons and placed under the command of the divisional cavalry regiments that were re-designated as cavalry commando regiments. As a part of this structure, a total of 11 commando squadrons were raised.

They continued to act independently and were often assigned at the brigade level during the later stages of the war, taking part in the fighting in New Guinea, Bougainville and Borneo, where they were employed largely in long-range reconnaissance and flank protection roles. In addition to these units, the Australians also raised the Z Special Unit and M Special Unit. M Special Unit was largely employed in an intelligence-gathering role, while Z Special Force undertook direct action missions. One of its most notable actions came as part of Operation Jaywick, in which several Japanese ships were sunk in Singapore Harbour in 1943. A second raid on Singapore in 1944, known as Operation Rimau, was unsuccessful.

=== Japan ===
The Imperial Japanese Army first deployed army paratroops in combat during the Battle of Palembang, on Sumatra in the Netherlands East Indies, on 14 February 1942. The 425 men of the 1st Parachute Raiding Regiment seized Palembang airfield, while the paratroopers of the 2nd Parachute Raiding Regiment seized the town and its important oil refinery. Paratroops were subsequently deployed in the Burma campaign.

However, as with similar airborne units created by the Allies and other Axis powers, the Japanese paratroops suffered from a disproportionately high casualty rate, and the loss of men who required such extensive and expensive training limited their operations to only the most critical ones. Two regiments of Teishin Shudan were formed into the 1st Raiding Group, commanded by Major General Rikichi Tsukada under the control of the Southern Expeditionary Army Group, during the Philippines campaign. Although structured as a division, its capabilities were much lower, as its six regiments had manpower equivalent to a standard infantry battalion, and it lacked any form of artillery, and had to rely on other units for logistical support. Its men were no longer parachute-trained, but relied on aircraft for transport.

Some 750 men from the 2nd Raiding Brigade, of this group were assigned to attack American air bases on Luzon and Leyte on the night of 6 December 1944. They were flown in Ki-57 transports, but most of the aircraft were shot down. Some 300 commandos managed to land in the Burauen area on Leyte. The force destroyed some planes and inflicted casualties before they were destroyed.

=== Poland ===
On 20 September 1940 the Polish government in exile in London formed a special military unit in Britain with the soldiers called Cichociemni (silent and unseen) paratroopers to be deployed into Poland to help the resistance. The Cichociemni were trained similar to the early British Special Forces with each soldier receiving specialization training for their specific task of deployment to Poland through a paradrop as a special operation to sustain a Polish state through training the members of the resistance in fighting the German occupants. This included Operation Tempest and uprisings in Wilno, Lwów and 91 operators taking part in the Warsaw Uprising.

Previous to the formation of the GROM unit Polish special operations rescued six CIA, DIA and NSA officers from Iraq on 25 October 1990.

=== United States ===
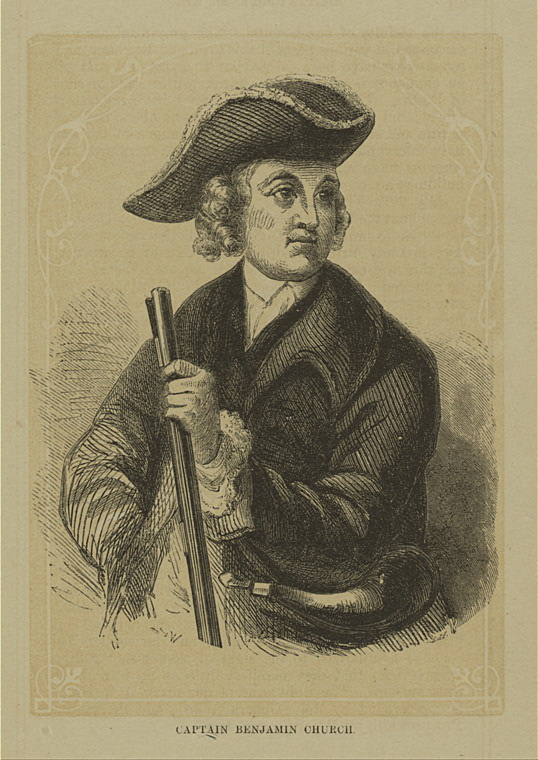
Colonel Benjamin Church (1639–1718) from the Plymouth Colony, father of American Ranging and Rangers

Between the 17th and 18th centuries, there were wars between American colonists and Native American tribes. The British colonial authorities in North America established specialized Rangers. Learning frontier skills from friendly Native Americans the Rangers helped carry out offensive strikes "frontier combat" against hostile Natives. Thus Ranger companies were formed to provide reconnaissance, intelligence, light infantry, and scouting. Colonel Benjamin Church (c. 1639–1718) was the captain of the first Ranger force in America (1676). Several Ranger companies were established in the American colonies, including Knowlton's Rangers, an elite corps of Rangers who supplied reconnaissance and espionage for George Washington's Continental Army. Rogers' Rangers on Roger's Island, in modern-day Fort Edward, New York, is regarded as the "spiritual home" of the United States Special Operations Forces, specifically the United States Army Rangers. These early American light infantry battalions were trained under Robert Rogers' 28 "Rules of Ranging", which is considered the first known manual of modern asymmetric warfare tactics used in modern special operations.

Army Rangers were essential to several World War II campaigns such as North Africa campaign "Operation Torch", Tunisian campaign, Sicily campaign "Operation Husky", and Normandy landings during D-day, Ranger companies landed at Pointe du Hoc.

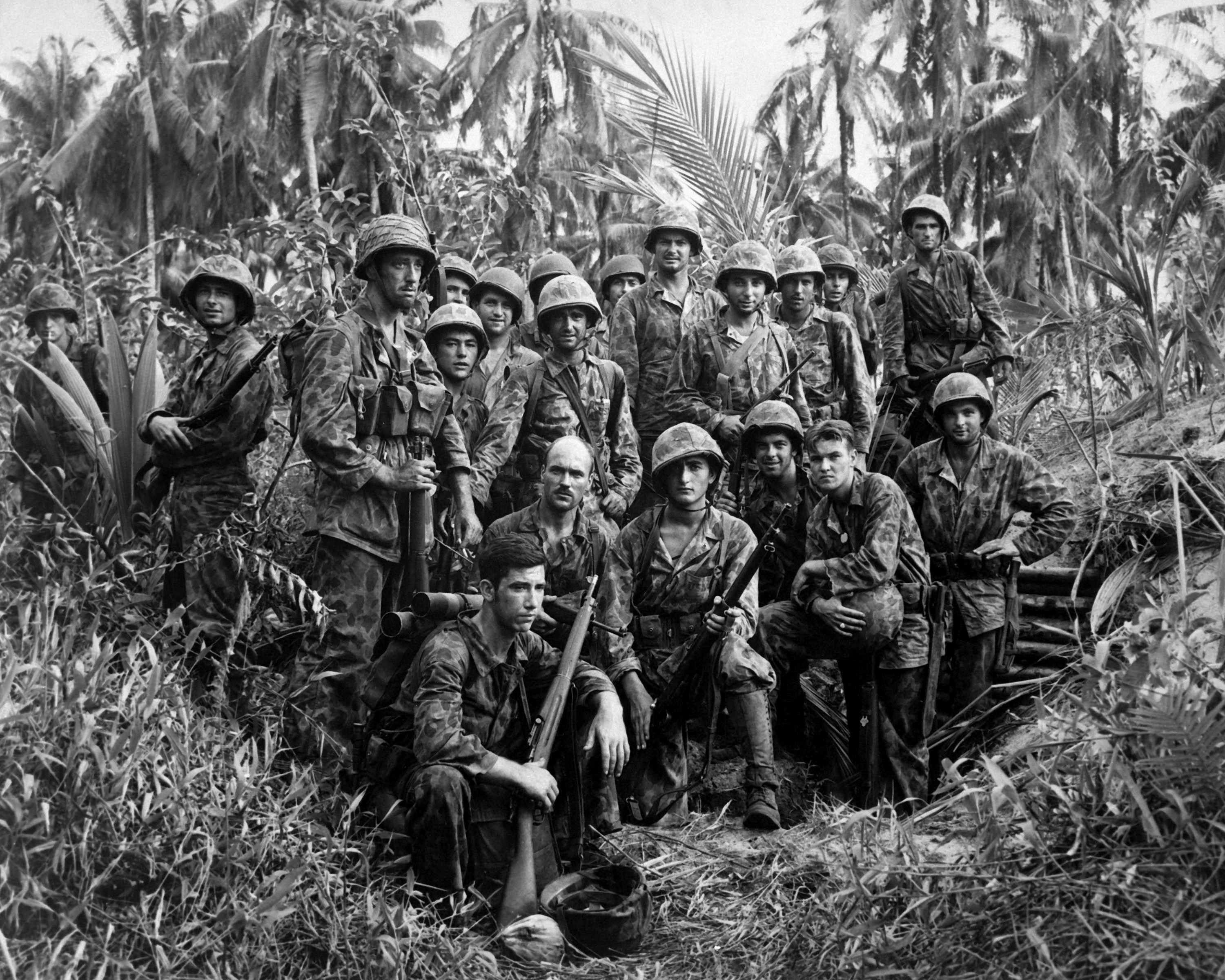
Marine Raiders gathered in front of a Japanese dugout on Bougainville.

In WWII, more elite units were needed to carry out special operations, raids, and reconnaissance, especially behind enemy lines. President Franklin D. Roosevelt established the Marine Raiders in February 1942 after Admiral Chester Nimitz requested commando units to raid Japanese-held islands. Major General Thomas Holcomb, the Marine Commandant, chose the name "Raiders" and created two battalions. Other specialized units such as Naval Combat Demolition Units and Underwater Demolition Teams (UDTs), the predecessors of the Navy's current SEALs, were formed in 1943.

Many more US special operation units had developed after and had fought in every major 20th-century conflict. In the 21st century, 2003–2012 saw U.S. national security strategy rely on special operations to an unprecedented degree. Identifying, hunting, and killing terrorists became a central task in the global war on terrorism. Linda Robinson, Adjunct Senior Fellow for U.S. National Security and Foreign Policy at the Council on Foreign Relations, argued that the organizational structure became flatter and cooperation with the intelligence community was stronger, allowing special operations to move at the "speed of war". Special operations appropriations are costly: Its budget went from $2.3 billion in 2001 to $10.5 billion in 2012. Some experts argued the investment was worthwhile, pointing to the raid in May 2011 that killed Osama bin Laden in Abbottabad, Pakistan.

That raid was organized and overseen by Admiral William H. McRaven, who was both a student and practitioner of special operations, having published a thesis on them in the 1990s. McRaven's theory of special operations was that they had the potential to achieve significant operational, political, or strategic effects. This potential required such units to be organized and commanded by special operations professionals rather than being subsumed into larger military units or operations, and required that "relative superiority" be gained during the special operation in question via characteristics such as simplicity, security, rehearsals, surprise, speed, and clearly but narrowly defined purpose.

Others claimed that special operations' emphasis precipitated a misconception that it was a substitute for prolonged conflict. "Raids and drone strikes are rarely decisive tactics and often incur significant political and diplomatic costs for the United States. Although raids and drone strikes are necessary to disrupt dire and imminent threats... special operations leaders readily admit that they should not be the central pillar of U.S. military strategy." Instead, special operations advocates stated that grand strategy should include their "indirect approach", suggesting that "the ability to operate with a small footprint and low-visibility, invest time and resources to foster interagency and foreign partnerships, develop deep cultural expertise, and rapidly adapt emerging technologies" was vital for maintaining deterrence and countering aggression. "Special operations forces forge relationships that can last for decades with a diverse collection of groups: training, advising, and operating alongside other countries' militaries, police forces, tribes, militias or other information groups."

== Countries and units with special operation focus ==
=== Australia ===
The Special Air Service Regiment, 1st Commando Regiment, and 2nd Commando Regiment are among the Army's special forces under the command of Special Operations Command.

=== Canada ===
Canadian Special Operations Forces Command (CANSOFCOM) is a command of the Canadian Armed Forces. It is responsible for all special forces operations responding to terrorism and threats to Canadians and Canadian interests around the world.

Joint Task Force 2 (JTF 2) is a special operations force, serving under the CANSOFCOM. JTF 2 works alongside many other special operations forces, such as Delta Force, SEAL Team Six, and the British SAS.

=== India ===
There are numerous special operation units in India, each branch of the Indian Armed Forces having its own unique SOF unit. The Indian Air Force has the Garud Commando Force, the Indian Navy has the MARCOS, and the Indian Army has the Para SF. Other special forces, like the National Security Guard under the Home Ministry, are not under military command but rather function as paramilitary organisations.

=== Ireland ===
The Army Ranger Wing is the special operations unit of the Defence Forces (Ireland).

=== Israel ===
Like the British Special Air Service and the US Army's Delta Force, General Staff Reconnaissance Unit 269 - Sayeret Matkal is the main Sayeret unit in the IDF. Its primary missions include obtaining strategic intelligence behind enemy lines and conducting hostage-rescue missions on foreign soil. The naval commando unit known as 13th Flotilla, or Shayetet 13, is comparable to the British Special Boat Service and the United States SEALs. It is assigned to maritime hostage-rescue missions and is a component of the Israeli Navy.

=== Jordan ===
King Abdullah II Special Forces Group (Arabic: العمليات الخاصة ورد الفعل السريع), commonly known as the JORSOF are strategic-level special forces of the Royal Jordanian Army under the Jordanian Armed Forces. Founded on April 15, 1963 on the orders of King Hussein, its primary roles include reconnaissance, counter-terrorism, search and evacuation, intelligence gathering combat, and the protection of key sites. The special forces group is also charged with carrying out precision strikes against critical enemy targets.

=== New Zealand ===
The 1st New Zealand Special Air Service Regiment (1 NZSAS Regt) is the special forces unit of the New Zealand Army, formed on 7 July 1955 and closely modelled on the British Special Air Service. Since 2015 the regiment has come under the Special Operations Component Command of the New Zealand Defence Force, with responsibility for counter-terrorism, overseas special operations, and the disposal of chemical, biological, radiological, nuclear and explosive hazards. The NZSAS has deployed to the Malayan Emergency, the Indonesian Confrontation, the Vietnam War, East Timor, and the War in Afghanistan, where its service with Task Force K-Bar earned the unit a United States Presidential Unit Citation in 2004.

=== Poland ===
Special Troops Command (Pol.: Wojska Specjalne) is the fourth military branch of the Armed Forces of the Republic of Poland which includes the unit Grom. The Command officially formed in early 1990 after the fall of communism in 1989. Polish Special Forces were first deployed into the conflict in Lebanon. The conflict in Lebanon was Poland's first official battlefield experience in post-communist times.

=== Russia ===
The Special Operations Forces of the Armed Forces of the Russian Federation constitute groups under the Special Operations Forces Command of the General Staff of the Armed Forces of the Russian Federation.

=== Turkey ===
The Special Forces Command (Tur.: Özel Kuvvetler Komutanlığı – ÖKK) is the main special forces unit of the Turkish Armed Forces, under the direct command of Turkish General Staff. Unit is particularly active in battle against PKK. Turkish Navy also have a special operations unit, Underwater Offence (Tur.: Sualtı Taaruz – SAT). They have participated in the Turkish invasion of Cyprus.

=== United Kingdom ===
The United Kingdom Special Forces (UKSF) is a directorate comprising the Special Air Service, the Special Boat Service, the Special Reconnaissance Regiment, the Special Forces Support Group, 18 (UKSF) Signal Regiment and the Joint Special Forces Aviation Wing.

In UK law, "special forces" means those units of the armed forces of the Crown and the maintenance of whose capabilities is the responsibility of the Director Special Forces or which are for the time being subject to the operational command of that director.

The British Army and the Royal Marines also have special operations-capable forces that do not form part of the UKSF, such as the Pathfinder Platoon, 148 Meiktila Battery, 4/73 Sphinx Battery, and Mountain Leaders of the Brigade Patrol Troop and commando unit recce troops.

The Army Special Operations Brigade was formed in 2021 and consists of four battalions of the Ranger Regiment. The formation is described as being "akin to that of the Special Forces Groups of the US Army Special Forces." The intention is that the brigade will be widely and actively deployable, including with the ability to train, advise and accompany the forces of partner countries, potentially in high-threat environments.

=== United States ===
The United States Special Operations Command (USSOCOM or SOCOM) is the unified combatant command charged with overseeing the various special operations component commands of the Army, Marine Corps, Navy, Air Force, and Space Force of the United States Armed Forces. The command is part of the Department of Defense and is the only unified combatant command created by an Act of Congress. USSOCOM is headquartered at MacDill Air Force Base in Tampa, Florida. Outside of the US military, the CIA SAC's Special Operations Group also conducts special operations missions as covert action represents an additional option within the realm of national security when diplomacy and military action are not feasible.

France

The COS ( Commandement des Opérations Spéciales) is France ‘s joint special forces command which includes units from the Army , Navy and Airforce it was created in June 1992 and is currently headquartered in the Hexagone Balard in Paris its primary missions include counter terrorism , hostage rescue and unconventional warfare. It is made of units such as the 1st Marine Infantry Parachute Regiment ( 1er RPIMa ) , the 13th Parachute Dragoon Regiment

( 13e RDP ) the Air Parachute Commando No. 10 (CPA 10 ) and the Commandos Marine

They have played a key role in multiple conflicts such as the War in Afghanistan (2001–2021) and the Mali War where they have conducted covert operations against groups like the Islamic State , Al-Qaeda and the Jama'at Nusrat al-Islam wal-Muslimin.

== See also ==
- Airborne forces
- Covert operation
- Foreign internal defense
- Frogman
- List of military special forces units
- Long-range reconnaissance patrol
