= RAF Odiham =

Royal Air Force main operating base in Hampshire, England

RAF Odiham
- Odiham, Hampshire in England
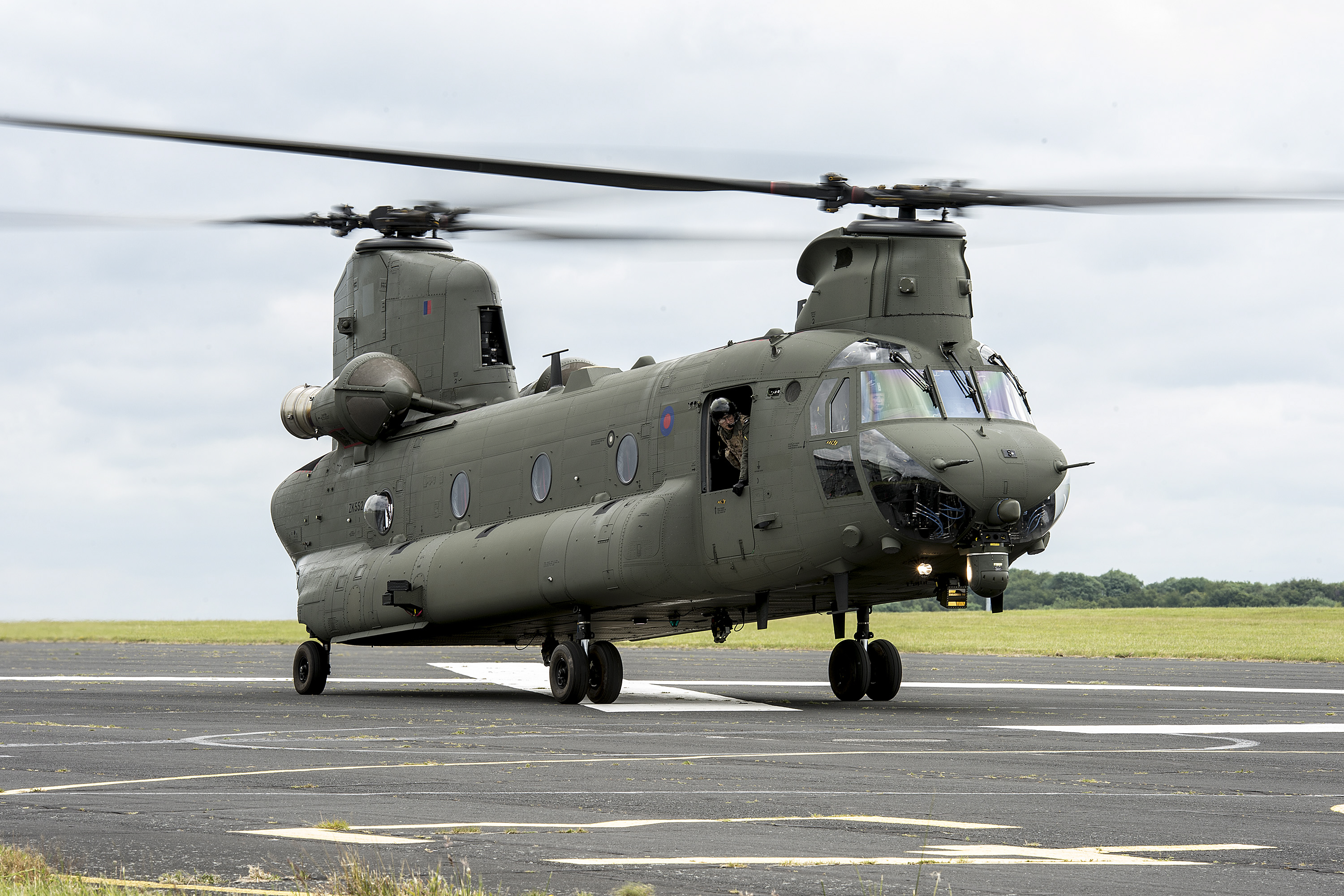
- An RAF Chinook HC6 based at Odiham.

- Promise and fulfil

Site information
- Type: Main Operating Base
- Owner: Ministry of Defence
- Operator: Royal Air Force
- Controlled by: Joint Aviation Command
- Condition: Operational
- Website: Official website

Location
- Shown within Hampshire
- Coordinates: 51°14′03″N 000°56′34″W
- Grid reference: SU740491
- Area: 263 hectares (650 acres)

Site history
- Built: 1925
- In use: 1925–present

Garrison information
- Current commander: Group Captain J N Doyle MBE
- Occupants: No. 7 Squadron; No. 18 Squadron; No. 27 Squadron; See Based units section for full list.

Airfield information
- Identifiers: IATA: ODH, ICAO: EGVO, WMO: 03761
- Elevation: 405 feet (123 m) AMSL
Runways
Direction	Length and surface
09/27	1,838 metres (6,030 ft) Asphalt
Helipads
Number	Length and surface
09/27	905.2 metres (2,970 ft) Grass
05/23	496.9 metres (1,630 ft) Grass
- Source: RAF Odiham Defence Aerodrome Manual

Royal Air Force Odiham or more simply RAF Odiham (IATA: ODH, ICAO: EGVO) is a Royal Air Force station situated to the south of the village of Odiham in Hampshire, England. It is the home of the Royal Air Force's heavy lift helicopter, the Boeing Chinook, and of The King's Helicopter Flight (TKHF). Its current station commander is Group Captain J N Doyle.

== History ==
Aircraft operations began from the site in 1925 but it was not until October 1937 that it was opened as a permanent airfield.

=== Second World War ===
During the Second World War North American Mustangs and Hawker Typhoons were flown out of the base. After the Allied invasion of Europe the site became a prisoner of war camp.

- No. 2 Squadron RAF operated the Mustang I between 7 August 1943 and 22 September 1943 and again between 6 October 1943 and 14 November 1943.
  - The squadron returned on 27 June 1944 with the Mustang II before leaving on 29 July 1944.
- No. 4 Squadron RAF using the Hawker Hector and the Westland Lysander I between 16 February 1936 and 24 September 1939.
  - The squadron returned on 7 August 1943 using the Mustang I until 15 September 1943 before returning again on 6 October 1943 and staying until 14 November 1943.
  - 4 Squadron returned again with Supermarine Spitfire XI between 27 June 1944 and 16 August 1944 with a detachment at B 10/Plumelot.
- No. 13 Squadron RAF with the Westland Lysander Mk III and the Bristol Blenheim Mk IV between 17 July 1941 and 1 August 1942 with detachments at RAF Detling, RAF Wattisham and RAF Thruxton.
  - The squadron returned on 10 August 1942 again with the Blenheim IV and for the first time the Mk V version. They left on 15 November 1942.
- No. 53 Squadron RAF with the Hawker Hector and the Blenheim IV between 8 April 1938 and 20 September 1939.
- No. 59 Squadron RAF operated the Blenheim IV between 6 June 1940 and 3 July 1940.
- No. 63 Squadron RAF using the Mustang Mk I between 21 November 1942 and 27 July 1943 with a detachment at RAF Macmerry.
- No. 82 Squadron RAF with the Blenheim IV between August 1939 and 21 March 1942 as an detachment from RAF Watton.
- No. 96 Squadron RAF operated the de Havilland Mosquito XIII between 24 September 1944 and 12 December 1944 before being disbanded here.

=== Postwar ===
==== Fighter role ====
Following the end of the War RAF Fighter Command assumed control of the base. No. 247 Squadron was re-equipped with de Havilland Vampires in June 1946, while No. 54 Squadron and No. 72 Squadron were both re-equipped with Vampires in July 1946. No. 54 Squadron and No. 247 Squadron both converted to night fighter units equipped with Gloster Meteor F.8s in 1951. As part of her coronation celebrations the Queen reviewed the Royal Air Force at Odiham in 1953.

No. 46 Squadron was re-formed at RAF Odiham on 15 August 1954 as a night fighter unit equipped with Meteor NF.12s and 14s. In 1955 No. 54 Squadron and No. 247 Squadron started receiving Hawker Hunters and, in 1956, No. 46 Squadron began converting to Gloster Javelins with the first arriving in February. Odiham closed as a fighter base in 1959.

==== Support helicopters ====
After a short period in "care and maintenance" status the base was reopened as part of Transport Command in 1960. In this role No. 72 Squadron was re-equipped with Bristol Belvedere HC.1 helicopters in 1961 and then with Westland Wessex HC.2 helicopters in 1964. The Westland helicopters were joined by the Pumas of No. 33 Squadron and No. 230 Squadron in 1971.

The first Chinook HC.1s arrived at Odiham in 1981. No. 7 Squadron RAF reformed in 1982. The HC. 1 variants were replaced by the Chinook HC.2 in 1993. The RAF ordered the Chinook HC.3, a special forces variant, in 1995. After being in storage for eight years due to avionics certification problems, the HC.3 airframes were retro-fitted with HC.2 avionics during 2009 and 2010, to enable them to finally enter RAF service. The Mk6, which incorporates a new Digital Automatic Flight Control System (DAFCS), is a new buy of 14 aircraft which arrived in 2013.

No. 618 Volunteer Gliding Squadron arrived in July 2000. The Unit operated the Vigilant T Mk 1 self-launching glider, providing basic flying and gliding training to members of the Air Cadet Organisation. Due to a fleet-wide airworthiness issue, the Vigilant (and its cousin, the Viking conventional glider) were grounded in April 2014. No. 618 Volunteer Gliding Squadron was subsequently disbanded.

In May 2015, it was announced that the Chinook Operational Conversion Flight, comprising six Chinooks and 150 personnel would transfer from Odiham to RAF Benson to form a joint Puma and Chinook Operational Conversion Unit. The move began in December 2015 as the unit joined their Puma counterparts at Benson under a reformed No. 28 Squadron.

With the Lynx reaching the end of its operational life in January 2018, No. 657 Squadron of the Army Air Corps and their Lynx AH9A disbanded in May 2018.

To extend their life for at least 15 years, Odiham's runways were upgraded in early 2021. The runway surfaces and lighting were replaced, with the airfield remaining open throughout the works.

== Role and operations ==
RAF Odiham's mission statement is to Deliver and sustain Chinook and Special Forces aviation operations world-wide, in order to support UK defence missions and tasks".

=== Support Helicopter Force (SHF) ===
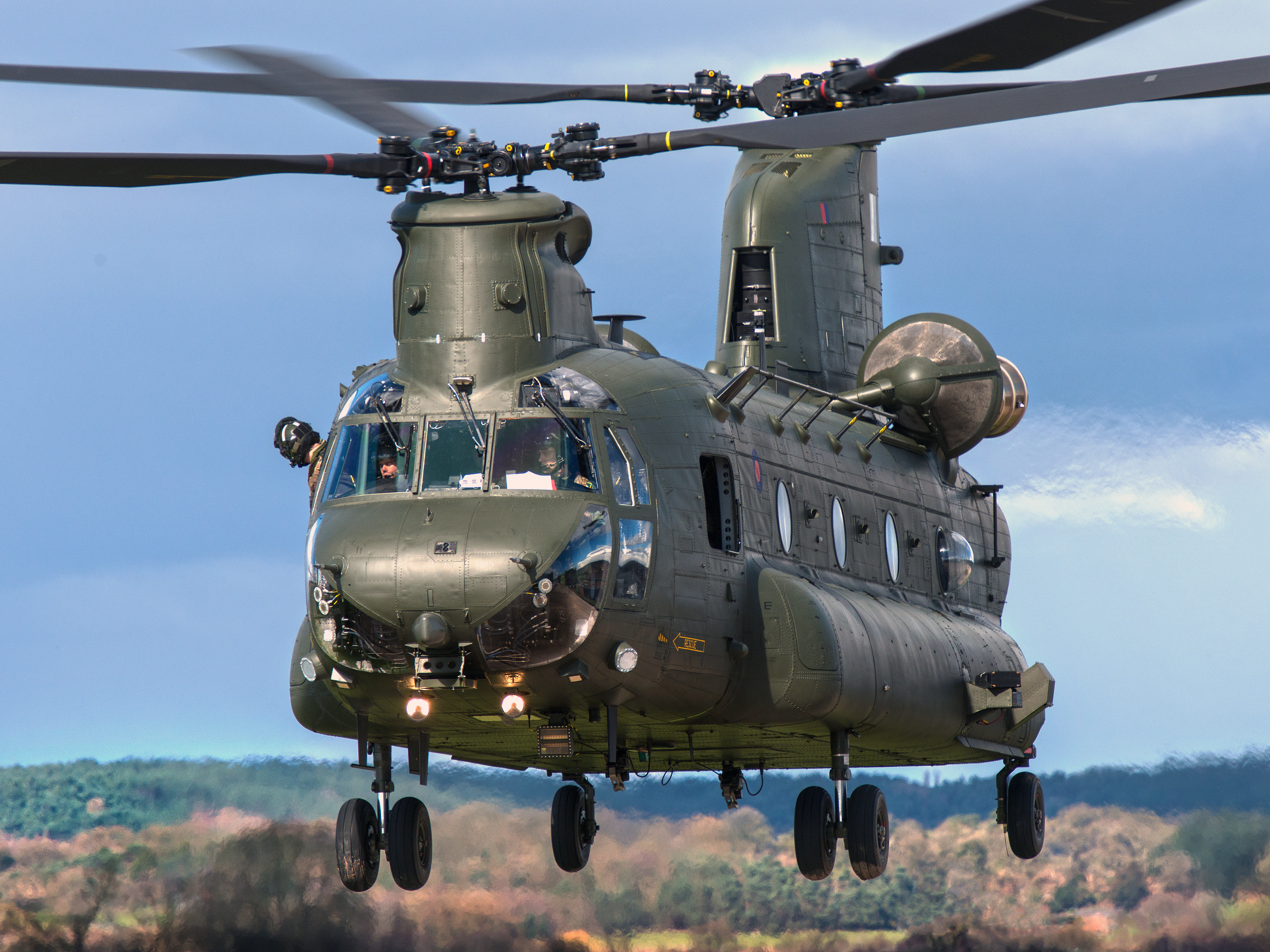
An RAF Boeing Chinook HC4 based at RAF Odiham.

To fulfil this mission, the station is home to No. 7 Squadron, No. 18 Squadron and No. 27 Squadron, all operating the Boeing Chinook and forming part of the RAF's Support Helicopter Force. The Chinook is a heavy-lift helicopter used for tactical troop and load movements and casualty evacuation across the battlefield. The aircraft can carry up to fifty-five troops or around ten-tonnes of mixed cargo either internally or as an under-slung load.

The Chinook Display Team is also based at the Station.

=== Joint Special Forces Aviation Wing ===
Odiham is home to the headquarters of the Joint Special Forces Aviation Wing (JSFAW). The wing is a Royal Air Force and British Army organisation that coordinates the provision of rotary wing aviation support to the United Kingdom Special Forces (UKSF). Providing this role are Chinooks of No. 7 Squadron at Odiham and Army Air Corps Eurocopter AS365N3 Dauphin II and Westland Gazelle AH1 aircraft based at Stirling Lines in Herefordshire.

=== Other activities ===
The Kestrel Gliding Club continues to fly from Odiham at weekends, having become part of the Royal Air Force Gliding and Soaring Association in 2006.

== Based units ==
The following flying and notable non-flying units are based at RAF Odiham.

=== Royal Air Force ===
Joint Aviation Command

- Support Helicopter Force
  - Headquarters, Support Helicopter Force
  - No. 18 Squadron – Chinook HC5, HC6A
  - No. 27 Squadron – Chinook HC5, HC6A
  - Chinook Display Team

No. 22 Group (Training) RAF

- Air Training Corps
  - No. 1827 (Odiham) Squadron, Hampshire & Isle of Wight Wing, Air Training Corps

=== Strategic Command ===
United Kingdom Special Forces

- Joint Special Forces Aviation Wing
  - Headquarters, Joint Special Forces Aviation Wing
  - No. 7 Squadron – Chinook HC6

=== Civilian ===
- Kestrel Gliding Club
- The King's Helicopter Flight – AW139

== Heritage ==
=== Station badge and motto ===
RAF Odiham's badge, awarded in November 1951, features a port portcullis between two towers each displaying a red rose behind two silver arrows with red feathers, crossing one another. The arrows are entwined by a jess and surmounted by a bell. The portcullis and towers relate to Odiham Castle, a ruin dating from the 13th century, located approximately 2 km north of the station. The portcullis also originates from the badge of Fighter Command, under which the station operated during the 1950s. The roses reference the Hampshire coat of arms and the arrows represent the speed of the aircraft flown from the station. Representing a falconer and bird, jess and bell, refer to the control of hunting aircraft and refer to the role of squadrons at the station.

The station's motto is 'Promise and Fulfil'.

=== Gate Guardian ===
RAF Odiham's gate guardian is a former US Army Boeing CH-47F Chinook. The airframe was donated by Boeing and reassembled at the station by Boeing and the RAF, using retired parts from several US and RAF Chinooks. It was unveiled in May 2012 by Secretary of State for Defence Philip Hammond during a visit to the station to celebrate 30 years of RAF Chinook operations.

== List of station commanders ==
- 1938–1940: Group Captain Freddie West; recipient of the Victoria Cross
- 1945: Wing Commander Nelles Woods Timmerman (RCAF)
- 1945–1946: Group Captain Reginald John Lane (RCAF)
- 1949–????: Acting Group Captain Deryck Stapleton
- 1950–1952: Group Captain Harold Maguire
- 1952–????: Group Captain John A. Kent
- 1955–????: Group Captain Ken Gatward
- 1971-1973: Group Captain John Slessor (son of Marshal of the RAF Sir John Slessor)
- 1979–1981: Group Captain Colin Reineck
- 1981–1983: Group Captain Sandy Hunter
- 1983–1985: Group Captain Brian Wright
- 1985–1987: Group Captain Timothy Garden
- 1987–1989: Group Captain John Day
- 1989–1991: Group Captain Joe French
- 1991–1993: Group Captain Chris Chambers
- 1993–1995: Group Captain Peter Crawford
- 1995–1997: Group Captain Paul Luker
- 1997–1999: Group Captain Al Campbell
- 1999–2001: Group Captain Mike Barter
- 2001–2003: Group Captain Andrew Pulford; later Chief of the Air Staff
- 2003–2005: Group Captain Trevor Milburn
- 2005–2007: Group Captain Sean Reynolds
- 2009–2011: Group Captain Steve Shell
- 2011–2013: Group Captain Dom Toriati
- 2013–2015: Group Captain Richard Madison
- 2015–2017: Group Captain Philip Robinson
- 2017–2019: Group Captain Lee Turner
- 2019–2021: Group Captain Nicholas Knight
- 2021–2023: Group Captain Donal McGurk
- 2023–2024: Group Captain Matt Roberts
- 2024–2026: Group Captain Sarah Moorehead
- 2026–present: Group Captain James Doyle

== See also ==
- List of Royal Air Force stations
