= PPPA =

PPPA may refer to:

- Pacific Press Publishing Association
- Professional Ping Pong Association
- Palestine Poster Project Archives
- People, Pay and Pensions Agency; see DBS Civilian HR
- Poison Prevention Packaging Act of 1970
- Printing Presses and Publications Act 1984

Drugs named PPPA:

- PPPA (drug), antidepressant
- [361436-79-5]
- [113190-92-4]
