= Oz Alashe =

British Army officer (born 1976)

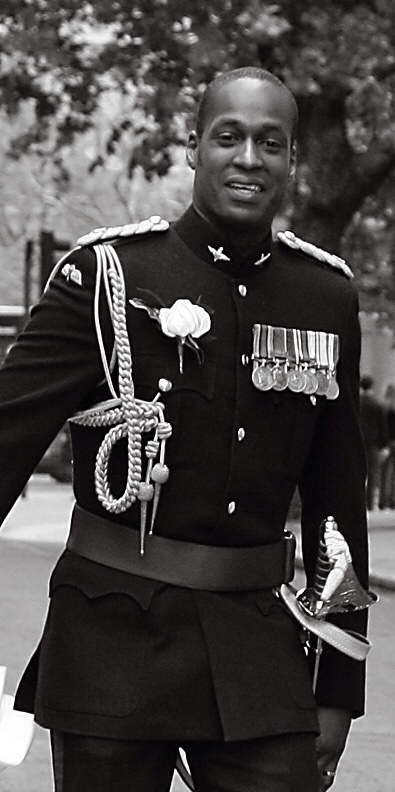
- Oz Alashe in 2007
- Born: 8 September 1976 (age 50); London
- Education: University of Reading
- Military career
- Allegiance: United Kingdom
- Branch: British Army (Parachute Regiment & UK Special Forces)
- Service years: 1998–2015
- Rank: Lieutenant Colonel
- Conflicts: Operation Banner (Northern Ireland); Operation Palliser (Sierra Leone); Macedonia; War in Afghanistan; Iraq
- Awards: Member of the Order of the British Empire

Lieutenant Colonel (Retd) Usman Adewale "Oz" Alashe, MBE is a tech entrepreneur and former British Army officer who served in the Parachute Regiment and United Kingdom Special Forces. He was the first black British officer to serve in both elite military organizations and is a veteran of the wars in Afghanistan and Iraq.

== Early life and education ==
Oz Alashe was born in 1976 in London, England to Nigerian parents who moved to the United Kingdom to study, and eventually settle. He studied at one of the oldest British public schools, St. Albans School, Hertfordshire before attending the University of Reading, where he read economics. Later Alashe attained his Post-graduate master's degree from King's College London. After university, he attended the Royal Military Academy Sandhurst before commissioning into the Parachute Regiment.

== Career ==
Between September 1998 and February 2015, Alashe served in the British Army. During that time, he served with the Parachute Regiment, UK Special Forces, and was posted into several staff jobs including at the Ministry of Defence in Whitehall.

In 2010, Alashe was awarded a Member of the Order of the British Empire in the Operational Honours List for "personal leadership in the most complex and sensitive of conflict environments." As well as operational tours in Iraq and Afghanistan, he also served in Northern Ireland, the Balkans, and Sierra Leone. He retired in 2015 as a Lieutenant Colonel.

After military service, Oz Alashe moved into the private sector, specifically into cybersecurity and intelligence. In 2017, he launched the cybersecurity and data analytics software company, CybSafe. In 2018, CybSafe secured a one-year contract with the UK's Financial Conduct Authority (FCA) to address the human element of cybersecurity.

Alashe's strategy for behavior modification attracted strong investor interest, resulting in a $7.9 million Series A funding round in 2021, followed by a $28 million Series B in July 2022, led by Evolution Equity Partners. In January 2021 he became the chairperson for the UK Government's (Department for Science Innovation and Technology) Expert Advisory Group of Cyber Resilience.

== Personal life ==
Alashe is married, lives in London and has three children.
