= Joint Special Forces Aviation Wing =

Joint Special Forces Aviation Wing (JSFAW)
- Active: 2 April 2001 – present
- Country: United Kingdom
- Branch: Royal Air Force; British Army
- Role: Special operations aviation support
- Size: Two squadrons
- Part of: United Kingdom Special Forces
- Stations: Headquarters – RAF Odiham; No. 7 Sqn RAF – RAF Odiham; No. 658 Sqn AAC – Stirling Lines
- Motto: Resolute
- Aircraft: Boeing Chinook HC6; Eurocopter AS365N3 Dauphin II

Commanders
- Current commander: Group Captain Nicholas Knight (RAF Odiham station commander)

The Joint Special Forces Aviation Wing (JSFAW) is a Royal Air Force (RAF) and British Army joint service organisation that coordinates the provision of aviation support to the United Kingdom Special Forces.

The wing is under the peacetime command of the Station Commander of RAF Odiham. However the Army and RAF retain full command of their respective personnel.

== History ==
The wing was established on 2 April 2001 to unite No. 657 Squadron of the Army Air Corps (AAC), which operated the Westland Lynx AH9 helicopter, and the Royal Air Force's No. 7 Squadron, which operated the Boeing Chinook HC2 helicopter, under the one command.

In 2006, No. 651 Squadron AAC was reformed at RAF Odiham to operate the fixed-wing Britten-Norman Defender 4000, and incorporated into the wing. In July 2008, the squadron relocated to RAF Aldergrove, as part of 5 Regiment AAC.

In 2008, No. 8 Flight AAC, which operated a covert fleet of military registered Eurocopter AS365N3 Dauphin II helicopters in civilian livery was incorporated into the wing. In September 2013, the flight was re-designated as No. 658 Squadron.

In May 2018, No. 657 Squadron AAC was disbanded following the retirement of the Lynx on 31 January 2018, with budget cuts precluding the purchase of replacement helicopters for the squadron's fleet. It was reported that an Army Air Corps Special Forces Flight of between two and four AgustaWestland Wildcat helicopters, named the Special Forces Wildcat Flight, would be established.

The wing has a charitable affiliation with the Worshipful Company of Curriers in the City of London.

== Structure ==
The composition of the wing and its aircraft is as follows: (Note: Most sources do not state that the Special Forces Flight No. 47 Squadron RAF which operates the Lockheed C-130 Hercules is part of JSFAW. However, one source in 2015 claimed it is part of JSFAW.)

- Headquarters Joint Special Forces Aviation Wing (RAF Odiham, Hampshire)
  - No. 7 Squadron RAF (RAF Odiham, Hampshire)
    - Boeing Chinook HC6
  - No. 658 Squadron AAC (Stirling Lines, Herefordshire)
    - Eurocopter AS365N3 Dauphin II

== See also ==
- United Kingdom Joint Aviation Command
- U.S. Army Special Operations Aviation Command
- U.S. Air Force Special Operations Command
- Australian Army 6th Aviation Regiment
- Canadian 427 Special Operations Aviation Squadron
- French 4th Special Forces Helicopter Regiment
- Italian 3rd Special Operations Helicopter Regiment
