= Special Forces Strike Group =

Special Forces Support Group
- Drop-zone flash worn by SFSG operators.
- Active: 3 April 2006 – present
- Country: United Kingdom
- Branch: Tri-service
- Type: Special operations
- Role: Special operations support
- Size: One battalion
- Part of: United Kingdom Special Forces (UKSF)
- Garrison/HQ: MOD St Athan, Wales, United Kingdom
- Engagements: War on terror • War in Afghanistan • Iraq War

The Special Forces Strike Group (SFSG), formerly the Special Forces Support Group, is a special forces support unit of the British Armed Forces. Established on 3 April 2006, it was redesignated in December 2025 to “better reflect its culture, ethos and critical role within UKSF”. The SFSG provides operational support to the Special Air Service, the Special Boat Service and the Special Reconnaissance Regiment. It is a tri-service unit comprising the 1st Battalion, Parachute Regiment (1 Para), a company of Royal Marine Commandos (F Coy), and a flight (platoon) from the Royal Air Force Regiment.

== History ==
=== Formation ===
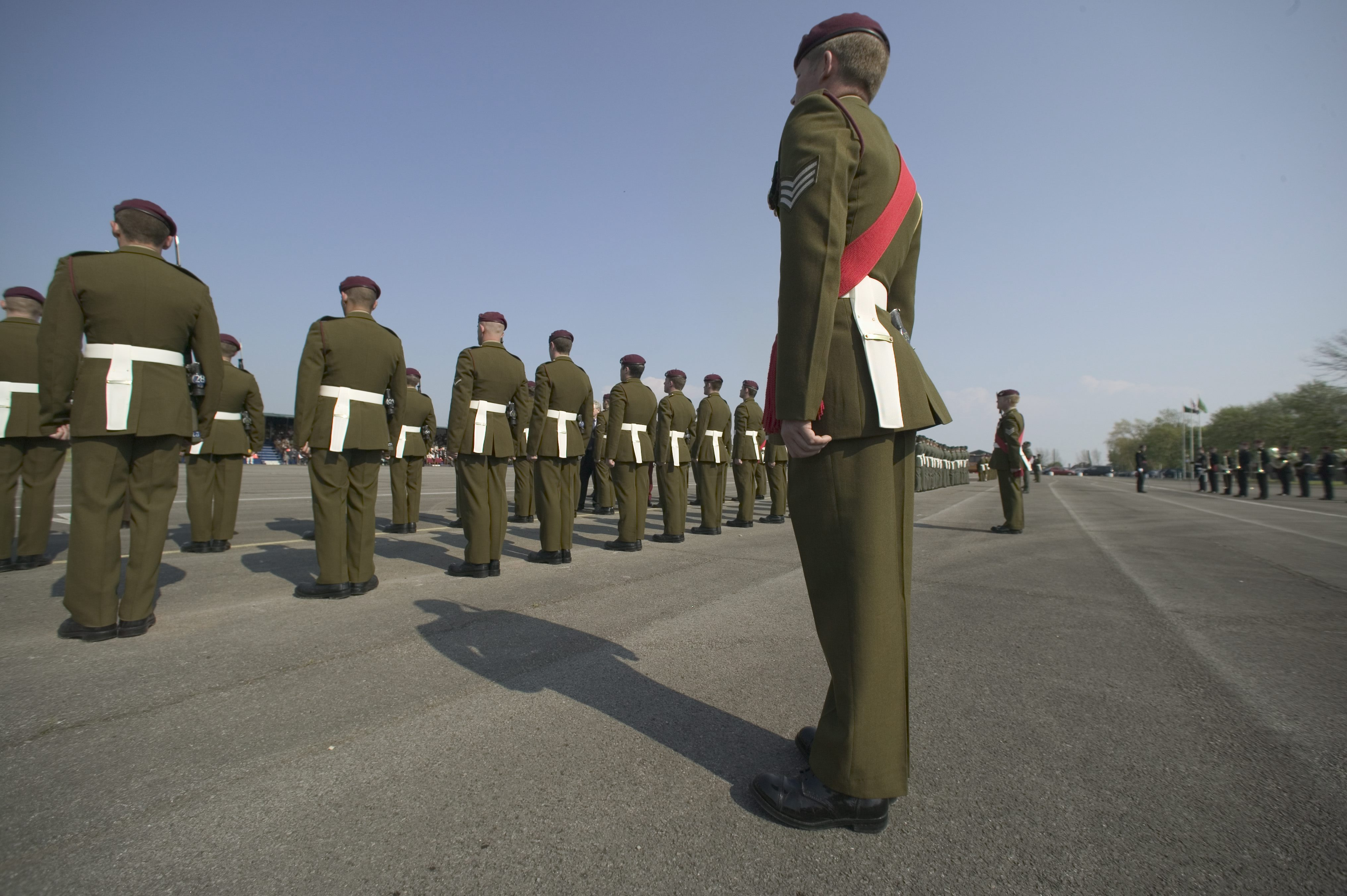
The Special Forces Support Group Inaugural Parade at RAF St Athan on 11 May 2006

The unit's creation stems from the need to provide infantry support to the United Kingdom Special Forces.

During Operation Barras in Sierra Leone in 2000, soldiers from 1st Battalion, The Parachute Regiment were deployed alongside troops from the SBS and D Squadron, Special Air Service (SAS). This was successful, as the SAS soldiers attacked the encampment containing the hostages while the soldiers from The Parachute Regiment attacked a second encampment.

In December 2004, it was announced that a unit would be formalised for this role as part of the wider future army structure. It was initially conceived as a battalion of "Rangers", similar to the United States Army Rangers. The SFSG's formation was announced officially by then Secretary of State for Defence John Reid in Parliament on 20 April 2006. It was established to support British special forces units in battle overseas and on domestic "counter-terrorist" operations.

The unit comprises a battalion of Parachute Regiment soldiers, a company of Royal Marine commandos, and a small platoon of RAF Regiment gunners. All soldiers selected for the SFSG have passed either the P Company selection course run by the Parachute Regiment, the All Arms Commando Course or the RAF Regiment Pre-Parachute selection course. Royal Marines and RAF Regiment gunners are sourced from across their Corps.

=== Operations ===
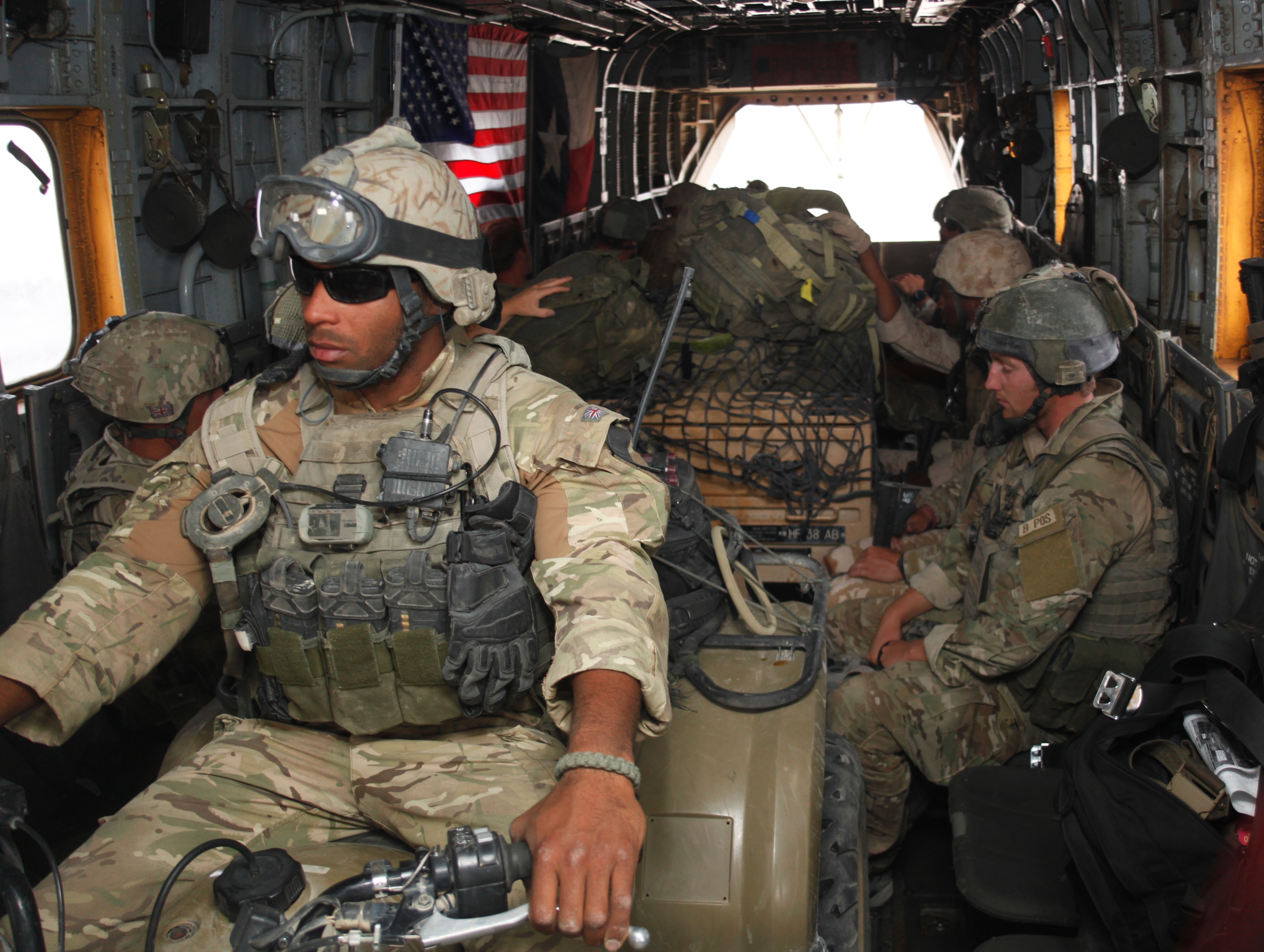
SFSG members in a CH-53D Sea Stallion during a joint UKSF/US Marine mission in Helmand Province, Afghanistan. 27 April 2011

During the Iraq War, the SFSG was part of Task Force Black/Knight which was composed of a rotational British SAS sabre squadron and a platoon of paratroopers from the SFSG (also known as Task Force Maroon). During the Basra prison incident, a platoon of SFSG accompanied A Squadron 22 SAS to Basra to assist in recovering the two detained SAS operatives. Paratroopers from the SFSG supported SAS operations around Baghdad usually cordoning off areas where the SAS were carrying out their missions. In late 2005/early 2006, the SFSG took part in Operation Lightwater The SFSG platoon in Iraq supported B Squadron 22 SAS during Operation Larchwood 4, killing one terrorist when he ran out of the target building and hid under a car. Members of the SFSG and the SAS often wore American Army Combat Uniform (ACU) or Desert Camouflage Uniform (DCU) to blend in when operating alongside American JSOC units.

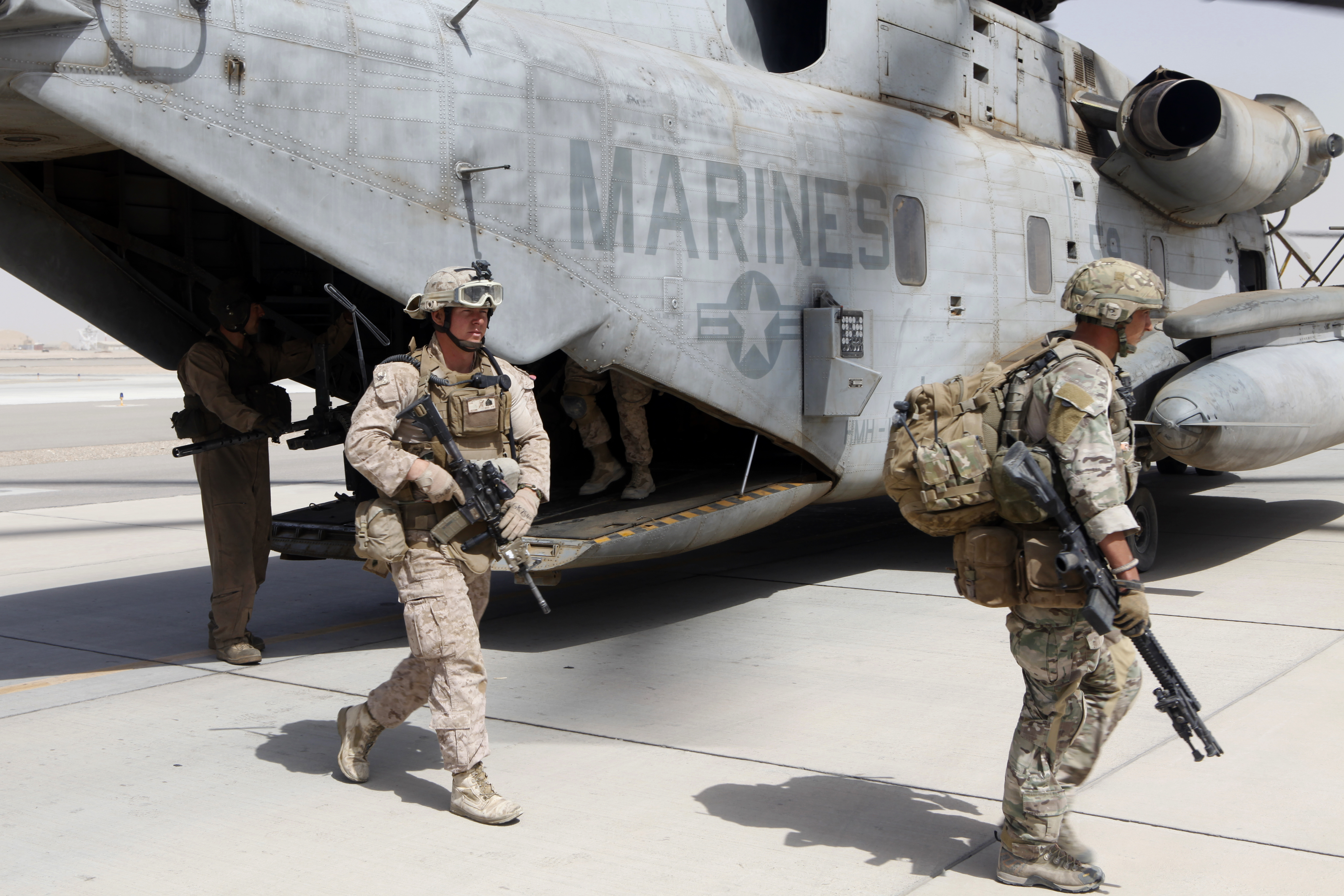
An SFSG member and a US Marine disembarking from a CH-53 Sea Stallion after a joint operation in Helmand Province 31 August 2013

An SFSG company was deployed to Afghanistan in 2006 to support the SBS and SRR as part of Operation Kindle, the UKSF deployment to Afghanistan (known as Task Force 42). On 9 September 2009, the Special Boat Service, supported by the SFSG, conducted a mission to rescue Stephen Farrell; a journalist captured and held at a Taliban safehouse in Char Dara District, Kunduz Province, by Taliban insurgents. The UKSF team was inserted by helicopters from the 160th SOAR, the SBS assaulted the safehouse whilst the SFSG set up a cordon. Farrell was rescued and a number of Taliban were killed, however one member of the SFSG was killed as well as Farrell's Afghan interpreter and two civilians. Between 18–29 December 2009, a company from the SFSG mentored two patrols from Afghan Task Force (ATF) 444-the Afghan special operations group for Helmand Province-during Operation Tor Shpa'h.

The SFSG have been known to carry out operations in Helmand Province with the United States Marine Corps; they also often conduct unilateral raids (similar to the US Army Rangers), but typically act as both blocking and quick reaction forces for special forces units. In August 2013, The Daily Telegraph reported that the SFSG, worked hand-in-hand with an elite unit of Afghan commandos, known as Task Force 444, throughout Helmand Province. The unit's A Company arrived in Afghanistan in January for a six-month tour and went on to mount relentless raids against the Taliban. The Ministry of Defence sources confirmed that the SFSG and Afghan strike forces led a series of raids on suspected Taliban bomb-makers in May after three British soldiers were killed in a roadside bomb at the end of April; the raids continued for two or three times a week afterwards. Also the unit targeted insurgent supply lines in the desert near the border with Pakistan, and Taliban bases in the centre of the province. In 2014, the SFSG maintained a high operational tempo months after the official end of offensive operations by UK forces.

== Organisation ==
The structure of the SFSG is as follows:

- Battalion Headquarters (BHQ)
- Headquarters (HQ) Company (formerly D Company)
  - Quartermasters
  - Motor Transport Platoon (MT Platoon)
  - Regimental Administration Office (RAO)
  - Regiment Aid Post
  - Catering Platoon
  - Operational Readiness Wing
  - General Training Cell
  - Runs the 'OAC' which trains new SFSG operatives to 'SFSG Operator Qualification' standards.
  - Counter Terrorism (CT) Cell
  - Campaigns Training Cell
  - Contingency Cell
  - Medical Support Detachment
  - Provides Combat Medical Technicians (CMTs).
- 4x companies: A, B, C, F
  - Each company has 3x platoons
- Support Company (S Coy)

Provides direct and in-direct fire support to the SFSG Companies.

- Direct Fires Platoon

(HMG, GMG, GPMG, Javelin).

- Joint Fires
  - Joint Tactical Air Controllers (JTACs) - tasked with calling in close air support
  - Mortars Platoon
- R Company (R Coy)

A restructuring of the SFSG in 2018 resulted in the creation of R Coy, which is configured as the unit's ISTAR (intelligence, surveillance, target acquisition, reconnaissance) and communications specialists. Sniper Platoon Provides sniper teams to support other SFSG elements.

- U Troop

Carries out reconnaissance.

- J6 Signals Platoon

Provides signals detachments to other SFSG elements.

- J2 Intelligence Platoon

Intelligence Corps personnel attached to the SFSG provide operational intelligence.

The Royal Marines elements form approximately one platoon strength within each of A, B, and C Companies. The RAF Regiment also provide a platoon in B company and forward air controllers to direct close air support. The Support company comprises mortar, sniper, and patrol platoons. The Patrol platoon operates vehicles, including the Jackal.

There is also a RAF Regiment CBRN unit assigned to the SFSG to provide specialised knowledge and capability to military and civilian agencies in detection and handling of chemical, biological, and radiological/nuclear weapons and materials.

== Uniform distinctions ==
Members of the SFSG wear the cap badge and beret of their parent unit, however the unit's DZ Flash—a lightning bolt superimposed on a downwards pointing Excalibur—is worn on the right-hand sleeve.

== Churchill Lines Foundation ==
The Churchill Lines Foundation (CLF), whose patron is His Majesty King Charles III, exists to support serving and former members of the unit and to disseminate information about its history, deeds and traditions.
