= No. 658 Squadron AAC =

Flying squadron of the British Army's Army Air Corps

658 Squadron AAC No. 8 Flight AAC No. 658 Squadron RAF
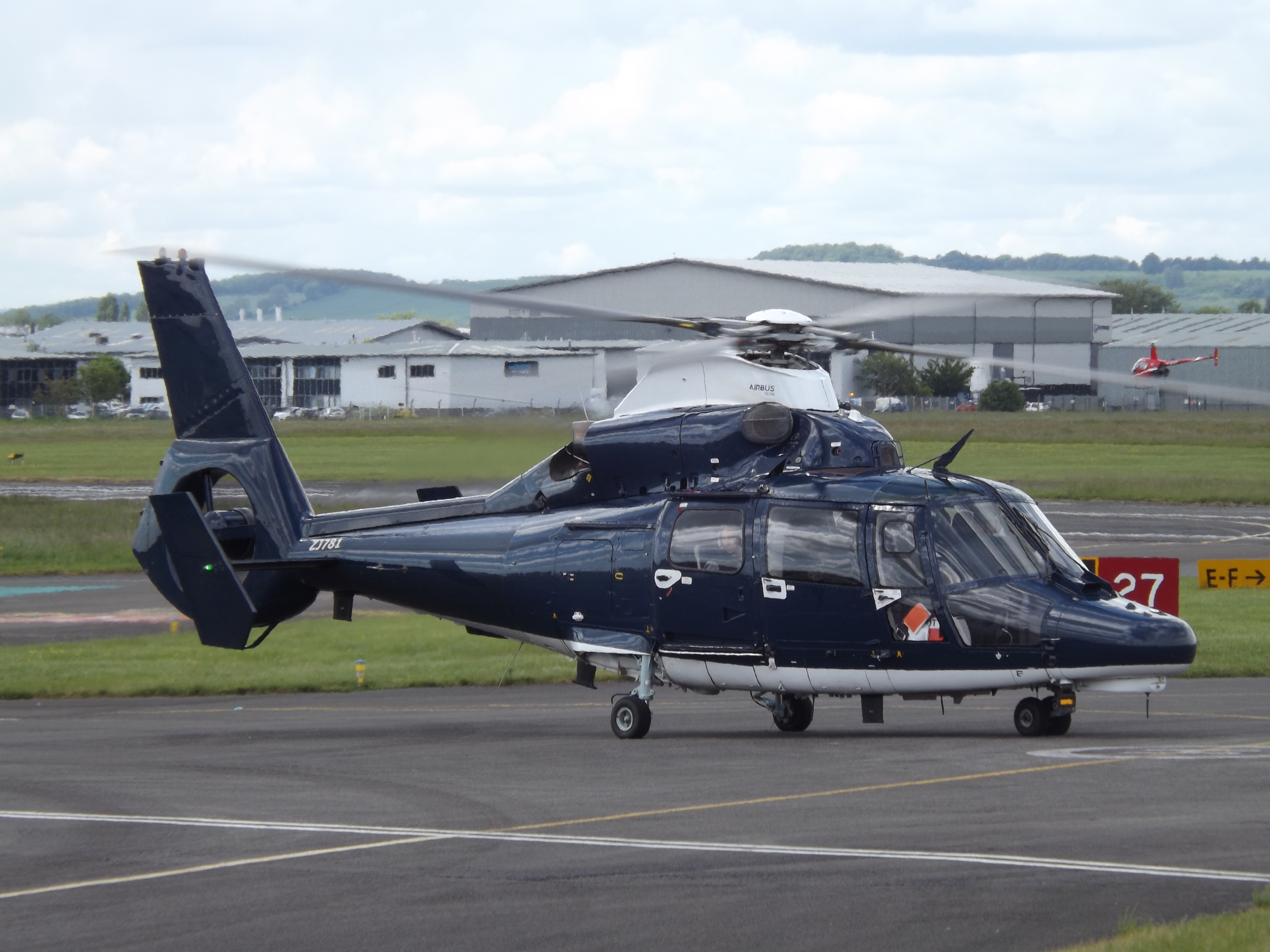
- Eurocopter AS365 Dauphin II in 2017
- Active: 30 April 1943 – 15 October 1946 (RAF); 1 September 2013 – Present
- Country: United Kingdom
- Branch: (United Kingdom) British Army
- Type: Army aviation
- Role: Counterterrorism; Helicopter support for special operations
- Size: Squadron
- Part of: Joint Special Forces Aviation Wing
- Garrison/HQ: Stirling Lines
- Nickname: Blue Thunder
- Mottos: Latin: Videmus Delemus (Translation: "We see and destroy")

Aircraft flown
- Helicopter: Eurocopter AS365N3 Dauphin II

658 Squadron AAC is a special operations support squadron of the Army Air Corps (AAC) unit of the British Army that provides dedicated aviation support to the 22 Special Air Service Regiment (22 SAS) for domestic counterterrorism (CT) operations. The squadron is co-located with 22 SAS at Stirling Lines. The press has given the squadron, their helicopters, and the CT response force they enable, the nickname "Blue Thunder". The squadron is part of the Joint Special Forces Aviation Wing.

== History ==
=== 658 Squadron RAF ===
No. 658 Squadron was a Royal Air Force air observation post squadron associated with the 21st Army Group during the Second World War. No.s 651 to 663 Squadrons of the RAF were air observation post units working closely with British Army units in artillery spotting and liaison. A further three of these squadrons, Nos. 664 to 666, were manned with Canadian personnel.

Its identification symbol was on a bezant, an eagle's head couped

No. 658 Squadron was formed at RAF Old Sarum on 30 April 1943 with the Taylorcraft Auster III and from March 1944 the Auster IV. The squadron role was to support the 21st Army Group and on 26 June 1944 it moved to France. Fighting in the break-out from Normandy it followed the army across the countries and into Germany. In October 1945 the squadron left for India, where it was disbanded on 15 October 1946.

The squadron number was transferred to the Army with the formation of the Army Air Corps (AAC) on 1 September 1957.

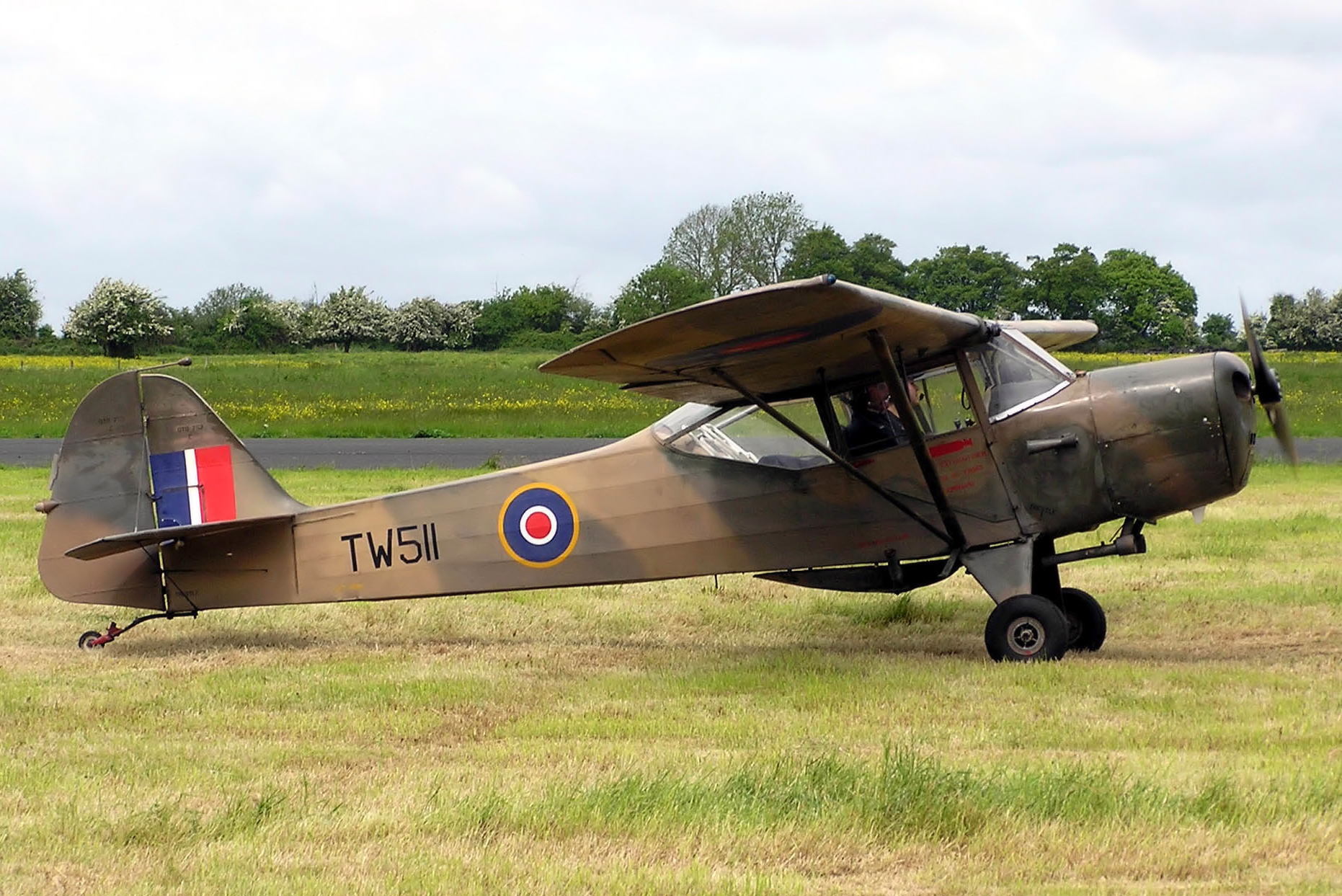
A postwar Auster Mk.V, restored in wartime colours.

Aircraft operated by No. 658 Squadron RAF
From	To	Aircraft	Variant
April 1943	April 1944	Auster	Mk.III
March 1944	September 1945	Auster	Mk.IV
August 1944	September 1945	Auster	Mk.V
November 1945	January 1946	Auster	Mk.V
June 1946	October 1946	Auster	Mk.V

=== 658 Squadron AAC ===
No. 658 Squadron AAC was formed on 24 October 1969 at Minden as part of the 1 Division Aviation Squadron AAC. In 1978, squadron moved to Soest as part of 3 Regiment AAC and disbanded. The squadron reformed c. 1982 as part of 7 Regiment AAC based at Airfield Camp, Netheravon. In April 1995, the squadron became a Territorial Army unit part of 7 Regiment AAC (Volunteers).

On 1 April 2009, the squadron was disbanded at Netheravon.

=== 8 Flight ===
8 Flight traces its lineage to the Royal Air Force No. 1908 AOP Flight formed on 31 December 1946, disbanded on 7 October 1955 and later reformed on 16 October that year.

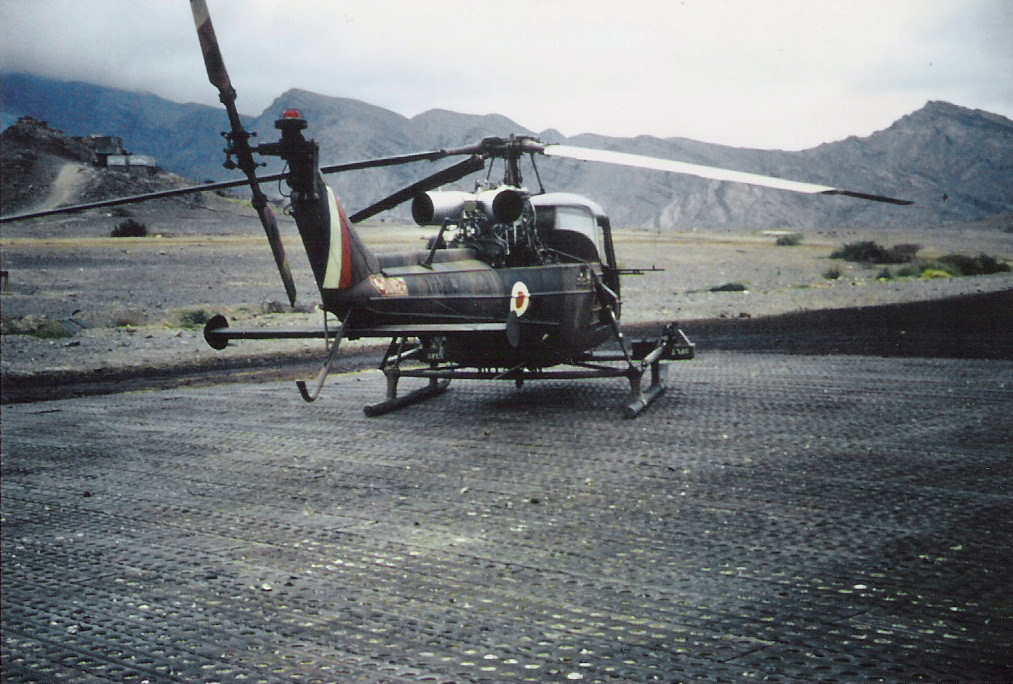
Westland Scout XR628 of 8 Flight deployed to RAF Habilayn in 1967.

On 1 September 1957, 8 Flight AAC was formed as 8 Reconnaissance Flight with the transfer of No. 1908 AOP Flight based at RAF Idris in Libya to the newly formed Army Air Corps. The flight relocated to Kenya where it was re-designated as 8 Flight AAC. The flight subsequently relocated to Aden operating the Westland Scout helicopter. The flight later deployed to Northern Ireland operating the Scout and Bell Sioux helicopters. In 1979, the flight was based at Airfield Camp, Netheravon. In 1984, the Agusta A109A/AM helicopter entered service with the flight. In 1984, the flight was part of 7 Regiment AAC. The flight operated a fleet of four A109As in civilian livery, two of which were captured from the Argentine forces in the Falklands War and allocated to the flight. In 1995, 7 Regiment re-roled as a Territorial Army unit 7 Regiment AAC (V). In 2000, the flight relocated to Stirling Lines.

In 2001, the flight was incorporated into the Joint Special Forces Aviation Wing (JSFAW). The flight operated the Westland Gazelle AH1 helicopter c. 2007. In 2009, the flight converted from the A109A to four Eurocopter AS365N3 Dauphin helicopters in civilian livery. The flight operated the Gazelle AH1 c. 2012.

== Present day ==
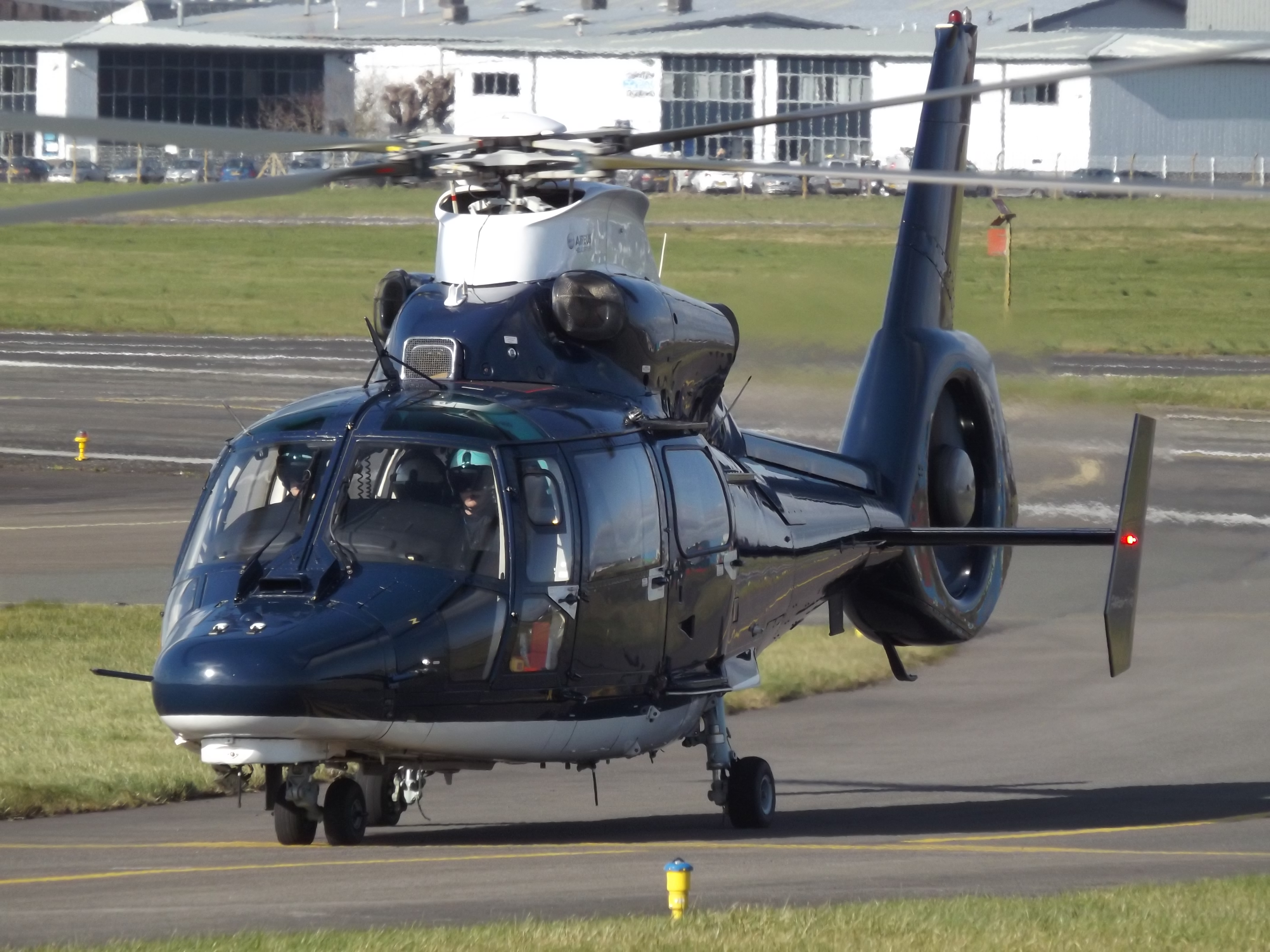
The Dauphin helicopter ZJ781.

On 1 September 2013, 8 Flight AAC was re-designated as 658 Squadron AAC.

=== Role ===
The squadron provides dedicated aviation support to 22 SAS with domestic CT operations based at Stirling Lines. The helicopters have been filmed taking part in fast-roping exercises.

=== Operations ===
Just after midnight on 4 June 2017, the squadron landed a Dauphin on London Bridge to provide support to the Metropolitan Police Service in response to the London Bridge terrorist attack. On 21 December 2018, a Dauphin helicopter was forward-deployed in the early stages of Operation Buckthorn. On 2 October 2025, the squadron deployed some of its helicopters to Manchester in response to the 2025 Manchester synagogue attack.

=== Aircraft operated ===
Aircraft	Variant	Introduced	In service	Registration(s)
Eurocopter AS365 Dauphin	N-3 Dauphin 2/N-3 Dauphin AH.1	2009	6	ZJ780, ZJ782, ZJ783; ZJ785;; ZJ786; ZJ787

On 16 June 2022, a Dauphin operated by the squadron, serial ZJ781, was involved in an accident. The severity of the accident put the aircraft beyond economic repair.

=== Future ===
The Dauphin helicopters operated by 658 Squadron are intended to be replaced under the New Medium Helicopter programme.

== See also ==
- List of Army Air Corps aircraft units
