= No. 7 Squadron RAF =

British flying squadron

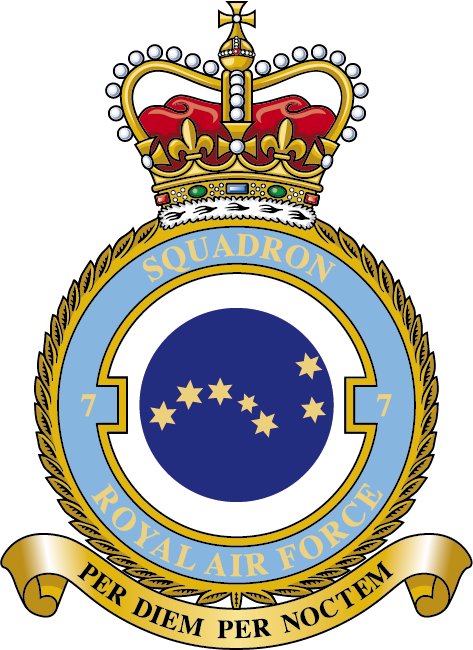
- Squadron badge
- Active: 1914–1914 (RFC); 1914–1918 (RFC); 1918–1919; 1923–1940; 1940–1956; 1956–1962; 1970–1982; 1982–present
- Country: United Kingdom
- Branch: Royal Air Force
- Type: Flying squadron
- Role: Air assault; Airlift; Combat search and rescue; Heavy-lift support; Medical evacuation; Military logistics; Special operations support
- Part of: Joint Aviation Command; Joint Special Forces Aviation Wing
- Station: RAF Odiham
- Mottos: Per diem, per noctem (Latin for 'By day and by night')
- Aircraft: Boeing Chinook HC6

Insignia
- Tail codes: LT (Nov 1938 – Sep 1939); MG (Aug 1940 – Apr 1951); XU (Jun 1943 – 1945); EA-EZ (Chinook)

No. 7 Squadron is a squadron of the Royal Air Force which operates the Boeing Chinook HC6 from RAF Odiham, Hampshire. It is part of the Joint Special Forces Aviation Wing.

== History ==
=== Formation and early years (1914–1919) ===
No. 7 Squadron was formed at Farnborough Airfield on 1 May 1914 as the last squadron of the Royal Flying Corps to be formed before the First World War, but has been disbanded and reformed several times since, the first being after only three months of existence, the latter as early as 28 September 1914. The squadron spent most of the First World War in observation and interception roles and was responsible for the first ever interception of an enemy aircraft over Britain.

The squadron deployed to France in April 1915, flying the Royal Aircraft Factory R.E.5 for reconnaissance and the Vickers Gunbus as escort fighters. Captain John Aidan Liddell of No. 7 Squadron was awarded the Victoria Cross for his actions on 31 July 1915, when he continued his reconnaissance mission over Belgium after the aircraft was hit by ground fire, the aircraft being badly damaged and Liddell suffering a broken thigh. Although he successfully recovered the R.E.5 to allied lines, saving his observer, he died of his wounds a month later.

The squadron re-equipped with the Royal Aircraft Factory B.E.2 in 1916, which it used for both bombing and reconnaissance during the Battle of the Somme that year. The B.E.2 was replaced by the Royal Aircraft Factory R.E.8 in July 1917, continuing in the reconnaissance role for the rest of the war, operating in Ypres during the Battle of Passchendaele in the summer and autumn of 1917 and in support of Belgium forces in the closing months of the war. The squadron disbanded at the end of 1919.

=== To Bomber Command (1923–1939) ===
No. 7 Squadron re-formed at RAF Bircham Newton on 1 June 1923 with the Vickers Vimy as a night heavy bomber squadron, continuing in this role with a succession of types through the inter-war period. It started to receive the Vickers Virginia bomber on 22 May 1924, being the first RAF squadron to operate the Virginia, although it did not dispose of the last of its Vimys until April 1927. In 1927, it moved to RAF Worthy Down, commanded by Charles Portal, later to become Chief of the Air Staff during the Second World War. In 1932, Frederick Higginson, who became a fighter ace in the Second World War, was assigned as a mechanic-gunner to the squadron.

The squadron gained a reputation as being one of the leading RAF heavy bomber squadrons, winning the Lawrence Minot Memorial Bombing Trophy six times between 1927 and 1933 and shared in 1934 with No. 54 Squadron, achieving an average bombing error of 40 yards (37 m). By this time, the elderly Virginia was obsolete and in April 1935 they were replaced by the more modern Handley Page Heyford, with which the squadron won the Lawrence Minot trophy yet again in 1935. Part of the squadron was split off in October 1935 to form No. 102 Squadron, while the remainder moved to RAF Finningley in September 1936. In April 1937 the squadron received four Vickers Wellesleys to equip a flight which was again split off to form No. 76 Squadron.

In March 1938, No. 7 Squadron replaced its Heyford biplanes with monoplanes from Armstrong Whitworth Whitley . It re-equipped again in April 1939, with Handley Page Hampden bombers replacing the Whitleys. In June 1939, it became a training unit, preparing crews for the Hampden equipped No. 5 Group.

=== Second World War (1939–1945) ===
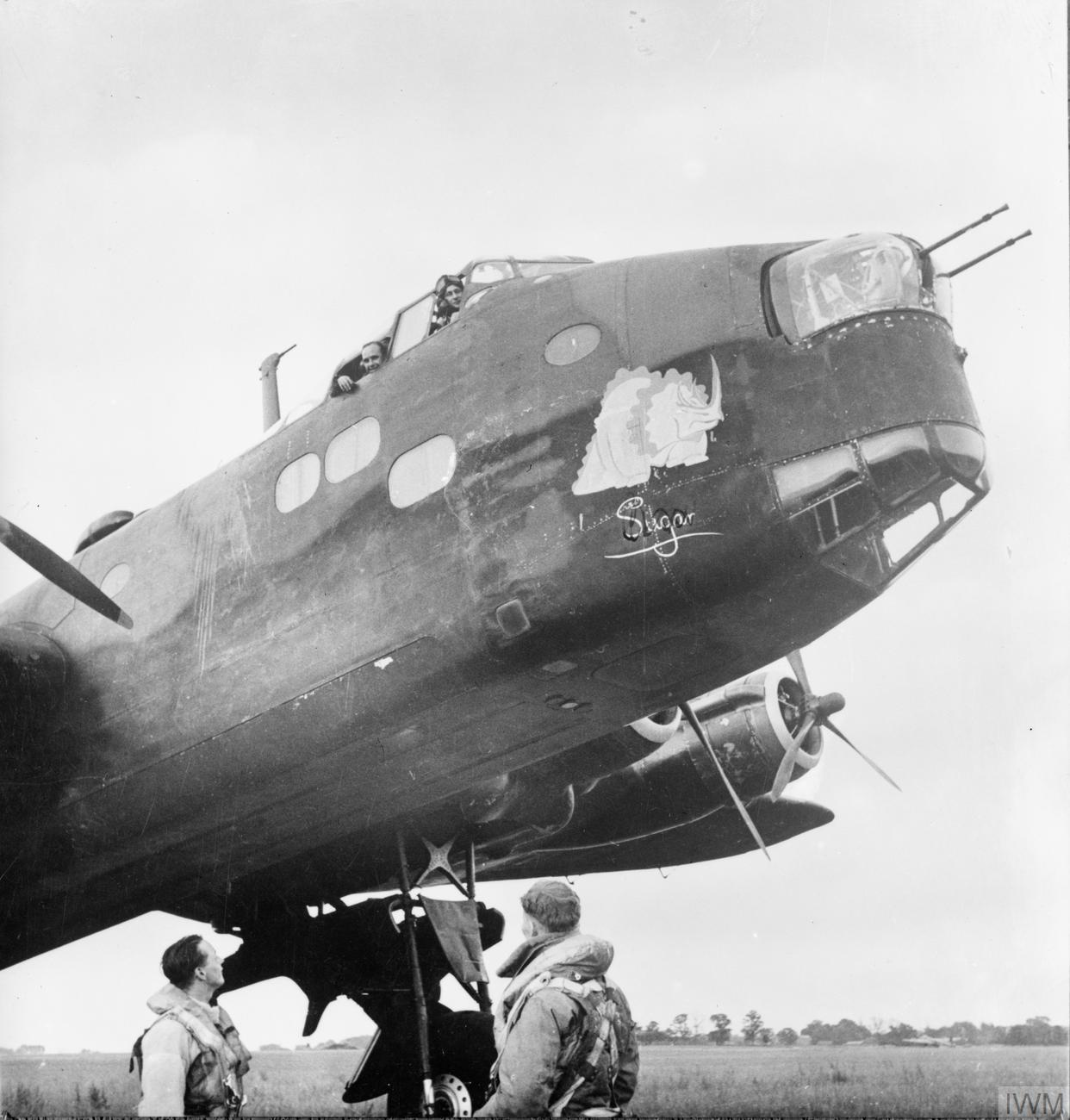
No. 7 Squadron Short Stirling "S for Sugar" at RAF Oakington during the early 1940s

On the outbreak of the Second World War, it continued to be used for training bomber crews, disbanding on 4 April 1940 when it merged with No. 76 Squadron to form No. 16 Operational Training Unit. On 1 August 1940, No. 7 Squadron reformed, becoming the first squadron to equip with the new Short Stirling heavy bomber. It was the first RAF squadron to operate four engined bombers during the Second World War, flying the first bombing raids with the Stirling against oil storage tanks near Rotterdam on the night of 10-11 February 1941. The squadron flew on the thousand-bomber raids to Cologne, Essen and Bremen in May and June 1942. It was transferred to the Pathfinder Force in August 1942, with the job of finding and marking targets for the Main Force of Bomber Command bombers.

The squadron re-equipped with the Avro Lancaster from 11 May 1943, flying its first operation with the Lancaster on 12 July 1943. It continued in the Pathfinder role until the end of the war in Europe. It flew its last bomber mission on 25 April 1945 against Wangerooge off the northwestern coast of Germany, and dropped food to starving civilians in the Netherlands in May. It was planned to relocate No. 7 Squadron to the Far East to join Tiger Force for air attacks against Japan, however the war ended before the squadron was due to move. No. 7 Squadron carried out 5,060 operational sorties with the loss of 165 aircraft.

=== Cold War (1945–1990s) ===
After the Second World War, the squadron was equipped with Avro Lincoln bombers, an update of the Lancaster. Based at RAF Upwood, the Lincoln was for several years the front line Cold War bomber aircraft. It was used in the Malayan emergency, the Middle East, the Trucial States (the Emirates) and then Aden. The squadron disbanded on 2 January 1956, before reforming with the Vickers Valiant at RAF Honington in Suffolk in December that year, flying in the strategic bomber role until disbanding in 1962. No. 7 Squadron was reformed in 1970, this time as a target towing squadron flying the English Electric Canberra until January 1982.

The squadron reformed in the support helicopter role, receiving the Boeing Chinook HC1 in September 1982. The Chinook HC2, equivalent to the US Army CH-47D standard, began to enter RAF service in 1993. Following the Iraqi invasion of Kuwait, the squadron took part in Operation Granby, the UK's deployment to the Gulf in 1991.

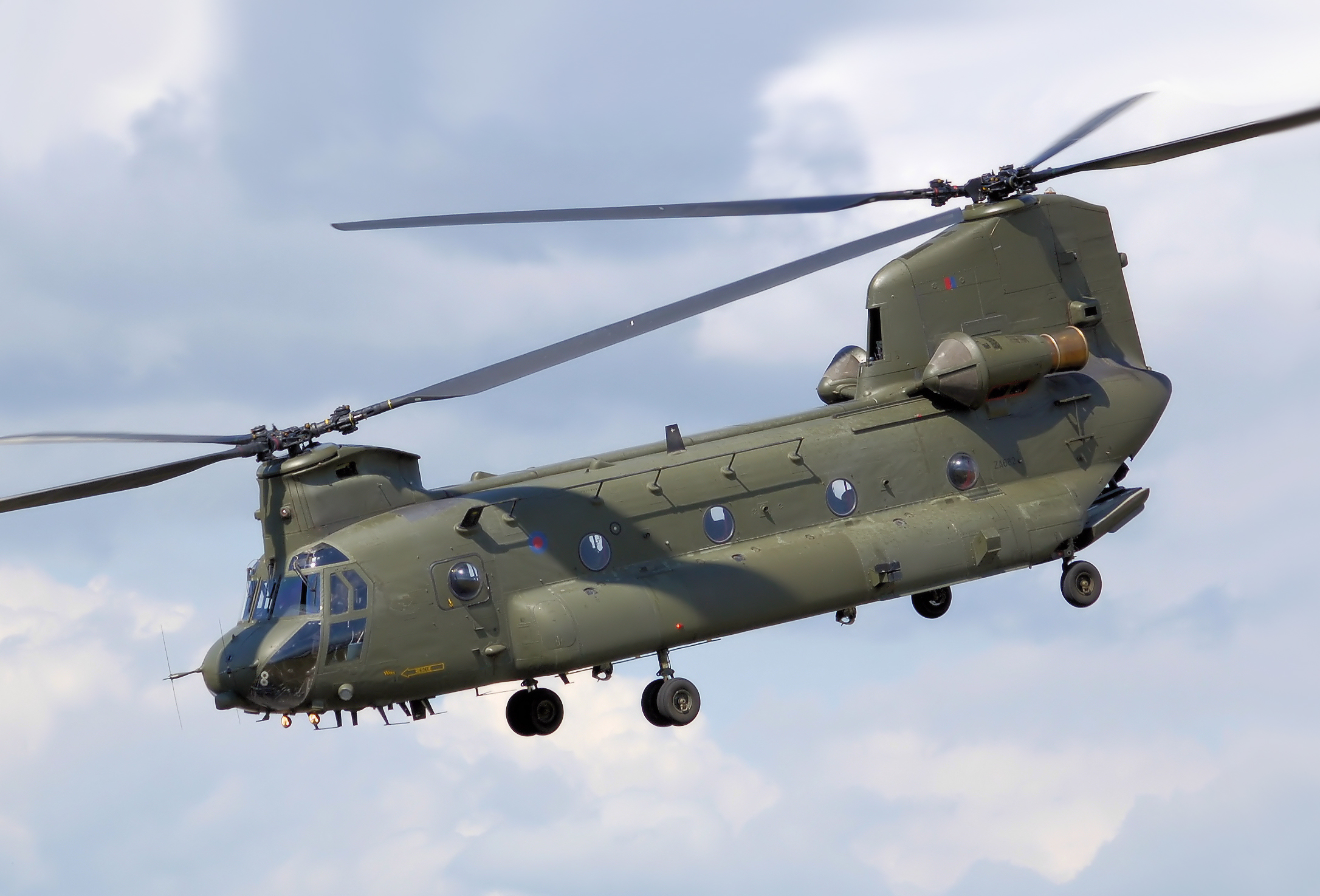
An RAF Chinook HC2 during 2008

On 2 June 1994, a No. 7 Squadron Chinook HC2 (ZD576) crashed into the Mull of Kintyre while carrying 25 senior members of the British security forces from RAF Aldergrove near Belfast to Inverness. All passengers and the four crew were killed.

=== 21st century (2000–present) ===
In April 2001, No. 7 Squadron became part of the Joint Special Forces Aviation Wing, with a role to support the United Kingdom Special Forces. On 19 August 2009, a Chinook made an emergency landing in Afghanistan after being hit by a rocket-propelled grenade.

In March 2020, the squadron was awarded the right to emblazon battle honours on its squadron standard, recognising its role in the British military intervention in Sierra Leone in 2000 and the War in Afghanistan between 2001 and 2014.

== Aircraft operated ==
After being formed at Farnborough in 1914, and before moving to France in 1915, No. 7 Squadron operated a number of different types on an experimental basis, sometimes for very short periods of time. These types include;

- Maurice Farman MF.7 Longhorn
- Royal Aircraft Factory B.E.8
- Sopwith Tabloid
- Farman HF.20
- Morane-Saulnier H
- Blériot XI
- Avro Type E

Other minor types that were operated after this date, either briefly or only in lesser capacities include;

- Voisin LA (1915)
- Bristol Scout (1915–16)
- Morane-Saulnier LA (1915)
- Vickers Wellesley (1937) - Four allocated to 'B' Flight who immediately split off to form No. 76 Squadron.
- Avro Anson Mk.I (1939–40) - Probably a single example used as squadron 'hack'.

The main types of aircraft operated by No. 7 Squadron include:

- Vickers F.B.5 Gunbus (September 1914 – April 1915)
- Royal Aircraft Factory R.E.5 (October 1914 – September 1915)
- Royal Aircraft Factory B.E.2, BE.2c BE.2d, BE.2e, BE.2f and BE.2g (July 1915 – June 1917)
- Royal Aircraft Factory R.E.8 (May 1917 – October 1919)
- Vickers Vimy (June 1923 – April 1927)
- Vickers Virginia Mk.II, Mk.VII, Mk.IX and Mk.X (May 1924 – March 1936)
- Handley Page Heyford Mk.II and Mk.III (March 1935 – April 1938)
- Armstrong Whitworth Whitley Mk.I and Mk.III (March 1938 – May 1939)
- Handley Page Hampden (April 1939 – April 1943)
- Short Stirling Mk.I and Mk.III (August 1940 – August 1943)
- Avro Lancaster Mk.I, Mk.III and B.1(FE) (May 1943 – January 1950)
- Avro Lincoln B.2 (August 1949 – December 1955)
- Vickers Valiant B.1, B(K).1, B(PR).1 and B(PR)K.1 (November 1956 – September 1962)
- English Electric Canberra B.2 and TT.18 (May 1970 – January 1982)
- Boeing Chinook HC.1, HC.2, HC.4 and HC.6 (September 1982 – present)

== Heritage ==
No. 7 Squadron's badge features on a hurt, seven mullets of six points forming a representation of the constellation Ursa Major. It was approved by King George VI in June 1939.

The squadron's motto is Per diem, per noctem (Latin for 'By day and by night').

== Battle honours ==
No. 7 Squadron has received the following battle honours. Those marked with an asterisk (*) may be emblazoned on the squadron standard.

- Western Front (1915–1918)
- Ypres (1915)
- Loos (1916)
- Somme (1916)
- Ypres (1917)
- Fortress Europe (1941–1944)
- Biscay Ports (1941–1944)
- Ruhr (1942–1945)
- German Ports (1942–1945)
- Berlin (1943–1945)
- France and Germany (1944–1945)*
- Normandy (1944)
- Rhine (1944–1945)
- Kosovo (1999)
- Sierra Leone (2000)*
- Afghanistan (2001-2014)*
- Iraq (2003)*
- Iraq (2003–2011)*

== See also ==
- List of Royal Air Force aircraft squadrons
