= 18th (UKSF) Signal Regiment =

Special forces communications unit of the British Army

18 (UKSF) Signal Regiment
- Active: 5 April 2005 – present
- Country: United Kingdom
- Branch: British Army
- Type: Special forces
- Role: Special operations communications
- Size: One regiment
- Part of: United Kingdom Special Forces
- Garrison/HQ: Stirling Lines
- Mottos: Latin: Colloquendo Imperamus (Translation: "Command through Communications")
- Engagements: War in Afghanistan; Iraq War

Insignia
- Abbreviation: 18 (UKSF) Sig Regt

18 (UKSF) Signal Regiment is a special forces unit of the Royal Corps of Signals in the British Army, that provides Communications and Information Systems (CIS), Electronic Warfare (EW) and Signals Intelligence (SIGINT) support, to the United Kingdom Special Forces (UKSF).

The regiment is under the operational command of the Director Special Forces and includes signal squadrons from both the Royal Corps of Signals and the Royal Navy.

== History ==
The regiment traces its lineage to 18 Signal Regiment formed in 1959 in Singapore as part of the Far East Land Forces (FARELF) which was disbanded on 1 December 1971.

18 (UKSF) Signal Regiment was established in April 2005 at the same time as the Special Reconnaissance Regiment (SRR). The establishment of the SRR was announced by the Secretary of State for Defence in the House of Commons. The regiment was formed around the existing communication capabilities of the Special Air Service (SAS) and Special Boat Service (SBS), namely 264 (SAS) Signal Squadron based at Stirling Lines, Herefordshire, SBS Signal Squadron based at RM Poole, Dorset and 63 (SAS) Signal Squadron (V) of the Territorial Army (now known as Army Reserve).

264 (SAS) Signal Squadron was formed in July 1966 to support 22 SAS and traces its lineage to a signal troop formed in 1951 for the Malayan Scouts. 63 (SAS) Signal Squadron (V) was formed on 1 April 1967 to support 21 SAS and 23 SAS from elements of 41 Signal Regiment, 63 Signal Regiment, 327 Signal Squadron and 115 Field Squadron Royal Engineers.

The regiment also incorporated 267 (SRR) Signal Squadron to support the SRR and a new squadron 268 (UKSF) Signal Squadron. 267 Signal Squadron had been formed on 18 December 1987. 268 (UKSF) Signal Squadron incorporated the strategic communications element from 264 (SAS) Signal Squadron which provided long range strategic communications. 63 (SAS) Signal Squadron (R) was re-designated as 63 (UKSF) Signal Squadron circa 2014.

== Cap badge ==
The regimental cap badge endorsed on 18 August 2020 is a Xiphos sword and three signal flashes representing the three supported regiments: SAS, SBS and SRR.

== Role ==
The regiment is tasked to deliver the "military CIS capability to enable UK Special Forces operations worldwide in support of Government, Foreign, Security and Defence Policy" with operators providing close support to the SAS, the SBS and the SRR.

The regiment served in Afghanistan and Iraq with several operators killed on special operations.

== Selection and training ==
Regular members of all three services of the Armed Forces and members from the Army Reserve are eligible to apply to join the regiment.

An applicant is required to successfully pass a 5 day Briefing Course and then successfully complete a 25 week UK Special Forces Communicators Course (UKSFCC) to become a Special Forces Communicator (SFC). Prior to attempting the UKSFCC, applicants have the option of attending a 3 week SFC Preparation Course.

The Special Forces Communicators Course consists of six phases: technical trade assessment, general support communications, physical aptitude, close support communications, conduct after capture, military training and special forces parachute training.

Applicants for reserve service in 63 (UKSF) Signal Squadron have to successfully pass an Assessment Course conducted over three weekends and then complete a two week Royal Signals Communications Training course to be eligible to be accepted as Fit for Appointment to the squadron. The applicant is then posted to the squadron to carry out a probationary year completing mandatory courses and a two week training exercise to achieve Fit for Mobilisation.

== Component sub-units ==
The regiment comprises:

- SBS Signal Squadron
- 264 (SAS) Signal Squadron
- 267 (SRR) Signal Squadron
- 268 (UKSF) Signal Squadron
- 63 (UKSF) Signal Squadron (Reserve)

== See also ==
- Units of the Royal Corps of Signals
