= DBS Civilian HR =

DBS Civilian HR is a unit within the Defence Business Services (DBS) organisation of the United Kingdom's Ministry of Defence (MoD). It is responsible for providing civilian personnel services to the MoD. The agency was known as the People, Pay and Pensions Agency from April 2006 when it subsumed the Pay & Personnel Agency, until July 2011 when its status as an executive agency was removed and it was integrated into the newly established DBS organisation.

Logo of the Pay & Personnel Agency, 2006-2011
