= Stirling Lines =

British Army garrison in Credenhill, Herefordshire

- Credenhill, Herefordshire, in England
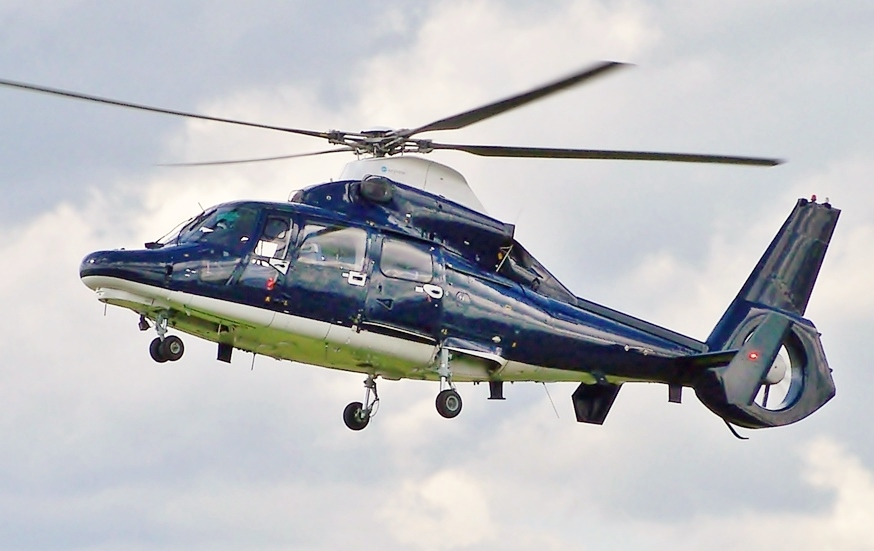
- A Dauphin II of No. 658 Squadron AAC based at Stirling Lines

Site information
- Type: British Army barracks
- Owner: Ministry of Defence
- Operator: British Army
- Condition: operational

Location
- Location in Herefordshire
- Coordinates: 52°05′06″N 002°47′42″W
- Grid reference: SO454428
- Area: 392 hectares (970 acres)

Site history
- Built: 1939; 87 years ago (as RAF Credenhill)
- In use: 1939–1994 (Royal Air Force); 1999–present (British Army)

Garrison information
- Occupants: 22 Special Air Service Regiment; Special Reconnaissance Regiment; 18 (UKSF) Signal Regiment; No. 658 Squadron (AAC)

Airfield information
- Identifiers: ICAO: EGVH
- Elevation: 240 metres (787 ft) AMSL
Runways
Direction	Length and surface
H.08 / H.26	150 metres (492 ft) asphalt
- Source: UK Military AIP

Stirling Lines is a British Army garrison located in Credenhill, Herefordshire; the headquarters of the 22 Special Air Service Regiment (22 SAS), Special Reconnaissance Regiment (SRR), and 18 (UKSF) Signal Regiment (18 (UKSF) SR). The site was formerly a Royal Air Force (RAF) non-flying station for training schools, known as RAF Credenhill (originally known as RAF Hereford).

== History ==
In 1958, the Special Air Service (SAS) was temporarily based at Merebrook Camp in Malvern, Worcestershire, a former emergency military hospital that had remained largely unused since 1945. In 1960, the SAS moved to a former Royal Artillery boys' training unit, Bradbury Lines, Putson in Hereford, which was subsequently renamed in 1984 to Stirling Lines in honour of the regiment's founder, Lieutenant Colonel David Stirling. In 1994, the Royal Air Force (RAF) ceased using RAF Credenhill; the British Army then obtaining the site to redevelop as a new base for the SAS; works commenced in 1997. The SAS commenced relocation of staff and equipment to Credenhill from Hereford with the redevelopment of the site. The move was completed in May 1999, and Bradbury Lines officially closed. On 30 September 2000; 26 years ago, the official opening ceremony was held for the new Stirling Lines with the clock tower re-erected on the new parade ground. The names of members of the Regular SAS who have died on duty were inscribed on the regimental clock tower.

The former 50 acres (20 hectares) Hereford site was sold in March 2001 to Wimpey Homes, a property developer.

== Based units ==
The following units are based at Stirling Lines:

- 22 Special Air Service Regiment
  - A Squadron
  - B Squadron
  - D Squadron
  - G Squadron
- Special Reconnaissance Regiment
- 18 (UKSF) Signal Regiment
  - 264 (SAS) Signal Squadron
  - 267 (SRR) Signal Squadron
  - 268 (Support Squadron) Signal Squadron
  - 63 (Reserves) Signal Squadron
- 658 Squadron AAC — Eurocopter AS365N3 Dauphin II

== See also ==
- List of airfields of the Army Air Corps (United Kingdom)
