= United Kingdom Special Forces =

British Ministry of Defence directorate

- Active: 1987–present
- Country: United Kingdom
- Branch: British Armed Forces
- Type: Directorate
- Size: 2,000 personnel (2009)
- Part of: Strategic Command
- Headquarters: Permanent Joint Headquarters, Northwood Headquarters
- Website: www.gov.uk/government/groups/directorate-of-special-forces

Commanders
- Notable commanders: General Mark Carleton-Smith

Insignia
- Abbreviation: UKSF

United Kingdom Special Forces (UKSF) is a directorate comprising the Special Air Service, the Special Boat Service, the Special Reconnaissance Regiment, the Special Forces Support Group, 18 (UKSF) Signal Regiment and the Joint Special Forces Aviation Wing.

Under the Freedom of Information Act 2000, "special forces" has been defined as "those units of the armed forces of the Crown the maintenance of whose capabilities is the responsibility of the Director of Special Forces or which are for the time being subject to the operational command of that Director". The Royal Marines and the Ranger Regiment are Special Operations Forces, but they do not form part of UKSF.

The government and Ministry of Defence (MOD) have a policy of not commenting on the UKSF, in contrast to other countries including the United States, Canada, and Australia. In 1996, the UKSF introduced a requirement that serving members sign a confidentiality contract preventing them from disclosing information for life without the prior approval of the MOD, following the publication of several books written by ex-service members.

== Formation ==
In 1987, the post of Director SAS became Director Special Forces. Since that time, the director has had control of both the Army's Special Air Service and the Navy's Special Boat Service, previously the Special Boat Squadron. The directorate has since been expanded by the creation of the Joint Special Forces Aviation Wing, the Special Reconnaissance Regiment, 18 (UKSF) Signal Regiment, and the Special Forces Support Group.

In 2015, the Royal Marines reported that approximately 40% of all UK Special Forces personnel were recruited from the Royal Marines.

On 1 September 2014, the two Army Reserve SAS regiments, the 21 (Artists) Special Air Service Regiment (Reserve) and the 23 Special Air Service Regiment (Reserve), were removed from the UKSF and placed in the 1st Intelligence, Surveillance and Reconnaissance Brigade (1 ISR Bde) under the command of Force Troops Command. Their role as part of 1 ISR Bde was to conduct Human, Environment, Reconnaissance, and Analysis (HERA) patrols. By April 2019, the two reserve regiments had returned to the UKSF.

Special Forces Flight, No. 47 Squadron RAF which operated the Lockheed C-130 Hercules aircraft was formerly part of the UKSF. No. 47 Squadron RAF was disbanded in September 2023 after the Hercules was retired from service in June 2023.

== Component units ==
The following units are part of UK Special Forces and UK Special Forces (Reserve).

=== British Army ===
- 22 Special Air Service Regiment (22 SAS)
- 21 Special Air Service Regiment (Artists) (21 SAS)
- 23 Special Air Service Regiment (23 SAS)
- Special Reconnaissance Regiment
- 18 (UKSF) Signal Regiment

=== Royal Navy ===
- Special Boat Service
  - SBS Reserve - R Squadron

=== Joint service units ===
- Special Forces Support Group

=== Joint Special Forces Aviation Wing ===
- No. 7 Squadron (Royal Air Force)
- No. 658 Squadron (Army Air Corps, British Army)

== Special Operations Forces ==
The Armed Forces have raised single Service Special Operations Forces (sS SOF), originally referred to as special operations-capable forces, that will conduct special operations to train, advise and accompany UK partner countries' forces in high threat environments. These forces do not form part of UKSF.

The Army formed the Ranger Regiment on 1 December 2021 within the new Army Special Operations Brigade (ASOB), established on 31 August 2021, that will take on some tasks traditionally done by special forces and work with partner forces. The Ranger Regiment's battalions are to be restructured by April 2023. The Chief of the Defence Staff has said that the Ranger Regiment will be similar to the United States Army Special Forces, known as the "Green Berets". Two of the four Ranger Regiment battalions will be deployed to Africa, the third will focus on Eastern Europe and the fourth will be deployed to the Middle East. In 2026, the ASOB was merged into the Land Special Operations Force.

The Royal Navy is changing the Royal Marines through the Future Commando Force concept, adapting their role of amphibious infantry held at readiness to versatile special operations forces. As originally envisaged, the Marines were to be permanently deployed in two new Littoral Response Groups, with one in Northern Europe and the other in the Indian Ocean.

== See also ==
- Afghan Unlawful Killings inquiry
- British Commandos
- List of military special forces units
- Special Operations Executive (SOE)
- United Kingdom Special Forces Selection
