= Special Reconnaissance Regiment =

Special forces unit of the British Army

- Badge
- Active: 6 April 2005 – present
- Country: United Kingdom
- Branch: British Army
- Type: Special forces
- Role: Special reconnaissance, Surveillance
- Size: 200-600 est.
- Part of: United Kingdom Special Forces
- Garrison/HQ: Stirling Lines, Hereford, United Kingdom
- Engagements: War on terror • War In Afghanistan • Iraq War • Al-Qaeda insurgency in Yemen • War in Somalia; Dissident Irish Republican campaign; Libyan Civil war

Commanders
- Colonel-in-Chief: Queen Camilla
- Abbreviation: SRR

The Special Reconnaissance Regiment (SRR) is a special forces unit of the British Army that provides advanced and specialist surveillance and special reconnaissance capabilities. It was established on 6 April 2005 and is part of the United Kingdom Special Forces (UKSF).

The regiment conducts a wide range of classified activities related to covert surveillance and reconnaissance. The SRR draws its personnel from existing units and can recruit male and female volunteers from any branch of the British Armed Forces.

== Formation ==
The Special Reconnaissance Regiment conducts surveillance operations mainly concerning, but not limited to, counter-terrorism (CT) activities. It was formed to relieve the Special Air Service and the Special Boat Service of that role and is believed to contain around 500–600 personnel. Media reports stated they are based alongside the Special Air Service at Stirling Lines barracks, Credenhill in Herefordshire. The SRR was formed to meet a demand for a special reconnaissance capability identified in the Strategic Defence Review: A New Chapter published in 2002 in response to the 2001 September 11 attacks on the US. The regiment was formed around a core of the already established 14 Intelligence Company, which played a similar role against the Provisional IRA in Northern Ireland during the Troubles. The first commanding officer of the SRR was Tim Radford, then a lieutenant colonel.

== Operational history ==
=== Iraq War ===
The regiment was active during the Iraq War as part of Task Force Black/Knight. Although members of other British Special forces units were sceptical of the value of the regiment, by mid-2006 a handful of SRR operators were operating in Baghdad. They formed Special Reconnaissance detachments that were commanded by SRR officers. The force was made up of Task Force Black/Knight operators who carried out difficult surveillance missions throughout the city.

=== Islamic terrorism in the United Kingdom ===
In the aftermath of 21 July 2005 London bombings, the SRR attached one of its members to each of the Metropolitan Police Service's surveillance teams to provide additional capability to a seriously overstretched SO12.

On 22 July 2005 Jean Charles de Menezes was shot dead by armed police officers on a London Underground train at Stockwell tube station. Three media reports carry unconfirmed assertions by unattributed UK government sources that SRR personnel were involved in the intelligence collection effort leading to the shooting and were on the tube train when it happened. A partial Ministry of Defence response was reported by The Sunday Times.

=== War in Afghanistan ===
On 27 June 2006, a 16-man unit from C Squadron, Special Boat Service and the SRR carried out Operation Ilois: an operation that covertly captured four Taliban leaders in compounds on the outskirts of Sangin, Helmand province. As they returned to their Land Rover vehicles, they were ambushed by an estimated 60 to 70 Taliban insurgents. With one vehicle disabled by rocket-propelled grenade fire, the team took cover in an irrigation ditch and requested assistance while holding off the Taliban force. The Helmand Battle Group had not been informed of the operation until it went wrong; a quick reaction force made up of a platoon of Gurkhas responded but ran into another insurgent ambush; one SBS member was seriously injured in the ambush. After an hour-long gunfight (some sources say three), the Gurkha quick reaction force and the 16-man unit, supported by a U.S. A-10 Thunderbolt and two Harrier GR7s managed to break contact and return to the closest forward operating base; two of the four Taliban leaders were killed in the firefight while the remaining two escaped in the chaos. Upon reaching the forward operating base it was discovered that Captain David Patton, SRR, and Sergeant Paul Bartlett, SBS were missing – one was helping wounded out of a vehicle when he was shot and assumed killed, while the second went missing during the firefight. A company from the Parachute Regiment in an RAF Chinook took off to find them, a pair of Apaches spotted the bodies and the Parachute Regiment troops recovered them. One SBS member was awarded the MC for his actions in the ambush.

=== Dissident Irish Republican campaign ===
In March 2009, Chief Constable Sir Hugh Orde informed the Northern Ireland Policing Board that he had asked for the Special Reconnaissance Regiment to be deployed in Northern Ireland to help the Police Service of Northern Ireland (PSNI) gather information on dissident republicans. He stated that they would have no operational role and would be fully accountable, as required by the St Andrews Agreement. Deputy First Minister and Sinn Féin MP Martin McGuinness and Sinn Féin leader Gerry Adams condemned the move, but Democratic Unionist Party (DUP) MP Ian Paisley Jr said the SRR "poses absolutely no threat to any community in Northern Ireland".

In April 2011, the Telegraph reported that a surveillance team from the SRR had spent three weeks tracking a cell of four men belonging to the Óglaigh na hÉireann (ONH)-a dissident Irish republican paramilitary group operating in Northern Ireland made up of members who split from the Real IRA. The SRR members (who were reportedly working for the Metropolitan Police's Counter Terrorism Command) watched the men, who photographed key roads and buildings in London, including the Olympic Stadium. Intelligence suggested that ONH and other dissident Republicans were not aiming to launch mass-casualty attacks but continue to target police and military targets. One source said the unit was not thought to have the capability of launching a terrorist attack on mainland Britain, although some dissidents have that capacity. The cell was not thought to be targeting the royal wedding.

=== Libyan Civil War ===
By the end of July 2011, a 24-man British special forces team from D Squadron 22 SAS, including members of the SRR who were expert in covert intelligence gathering had been deployed to Libya to train and mentor NTC units against the Gaddafi regime during the Libyan Civil war. These forces linked up with Commandement des Opérations Spéciales, the French Special Forces Command (French Army), in Zuwaytinah, the command headquarters for the eastern front, 90 miles south west of Benghazi. From there they were sent to the west of the country via Tunisia to train rebels in the western mountains, in places like Zintan.

=== Yemen and Somalia ===
In April 2016, it was reported that members of the Special Reconnaissance Regiment were seconded to MI6 teams in Yemen to train Yemeni forces fighting AQAP, as well as identifying targets for drone strikes. Along with the SAS, they have been carrying out a similar role in Somalia.

== Role ==
The SRR performs clandestine intelligence, surveillance, target acquisition, and reconnaissance (ISTAR) missions. It has a focus on special reconnaissance and surveillance to aid in counter-terrorism and counterinsurgency efforts.

== Uniform distinctions ==
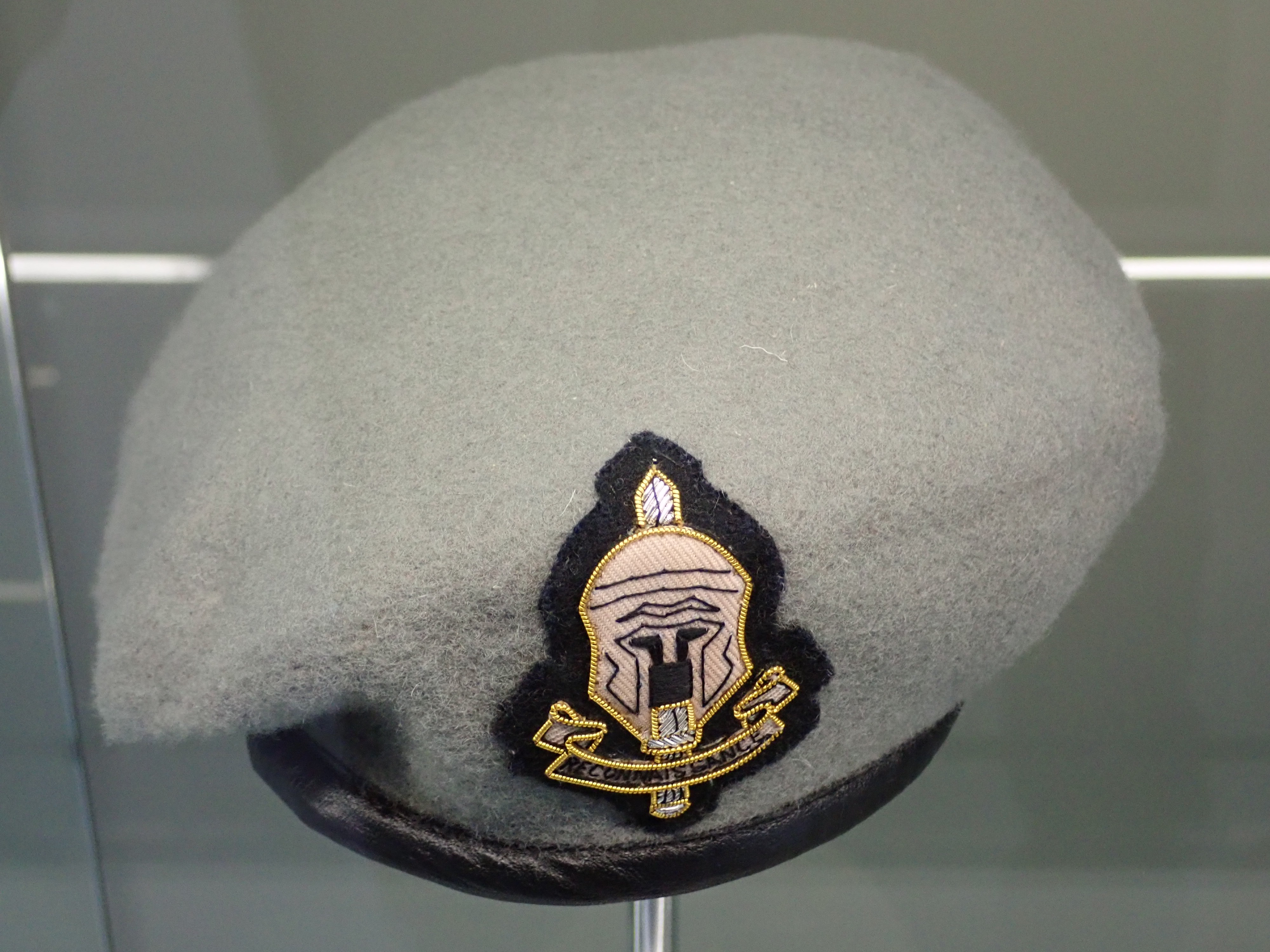
SRR Beret at the National Army Museum, Chelsea

Personnel retain the uniforms of their parent organisations with the addition of an "emerald grey" coloured beret and the SRR cap badge. UKSF units display the mythical sword Excalibur on their cap badges, in the case of the SRR behind a Corinthian helmet and with a scroll inscribed RECONNAISSANCE. The stable belt of the SRR is similar in style to that of the SAS, but is a darker midnight blue.

== See also ==
- List of military special forces units
- United Kingdom Special Forces
- Intelligence Support Activity (United States)
