= Bravo November =

RAF Chinook helicopter

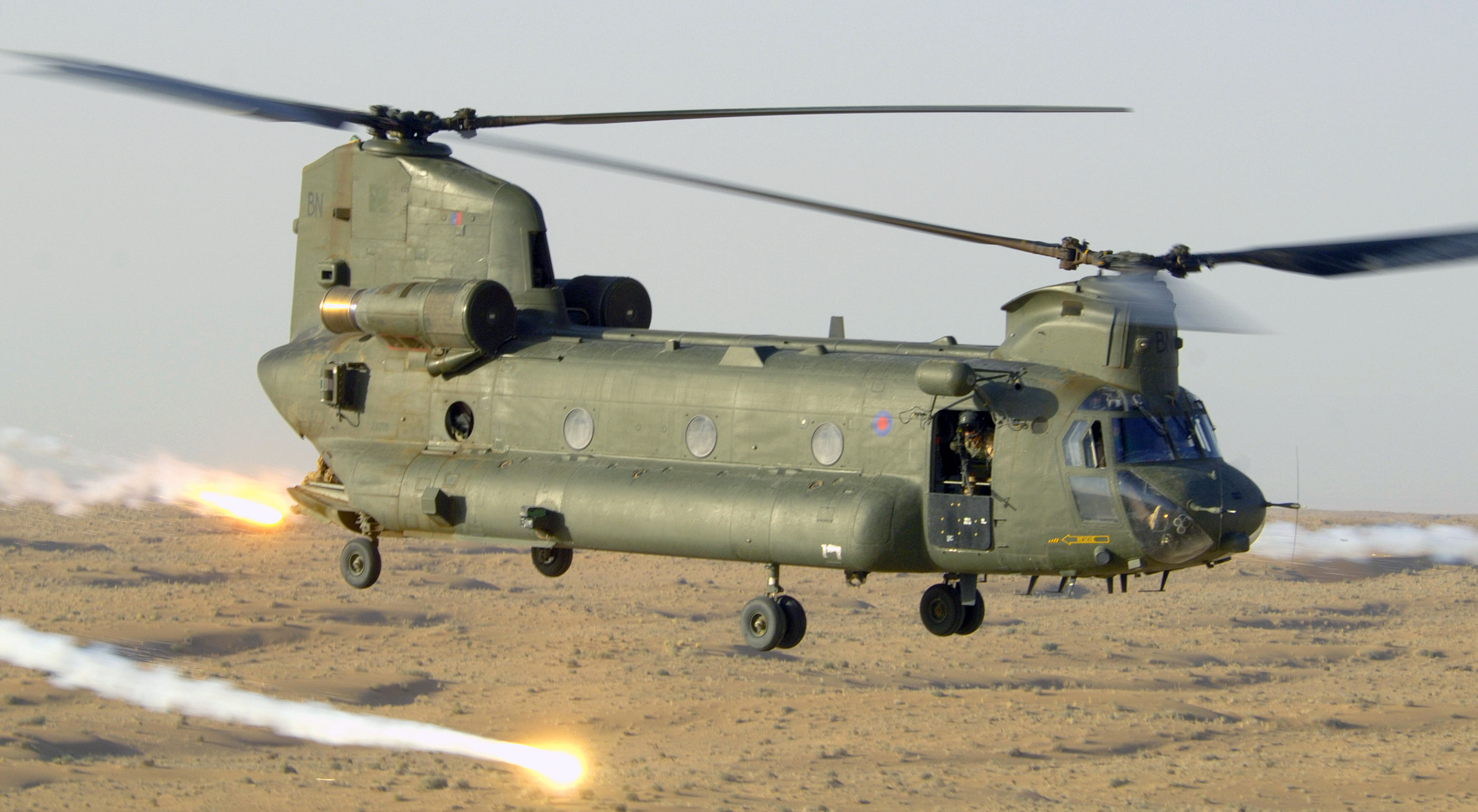
- Bravo November releases flares during an operation over Afghanistan in 2006

General information
- Type: Boeing Chinook HC6A
- Manufacturer: Boeing Vertol
- Owners: Royal Air Force Museum
- Construction number: B-849 / MA-030 / M-7001
- Serial: ZA718
- Radio code: Bravo November (BN)

History
- In service: 1982 as HC.1– 2022 as HC.4
- Preserved at: Royal Air Force Museum Midlands
- Fate: Remanufactured as HC.2; Remanufactured as HC.4; Acquired by the Royal Air Force Museum, March 2022

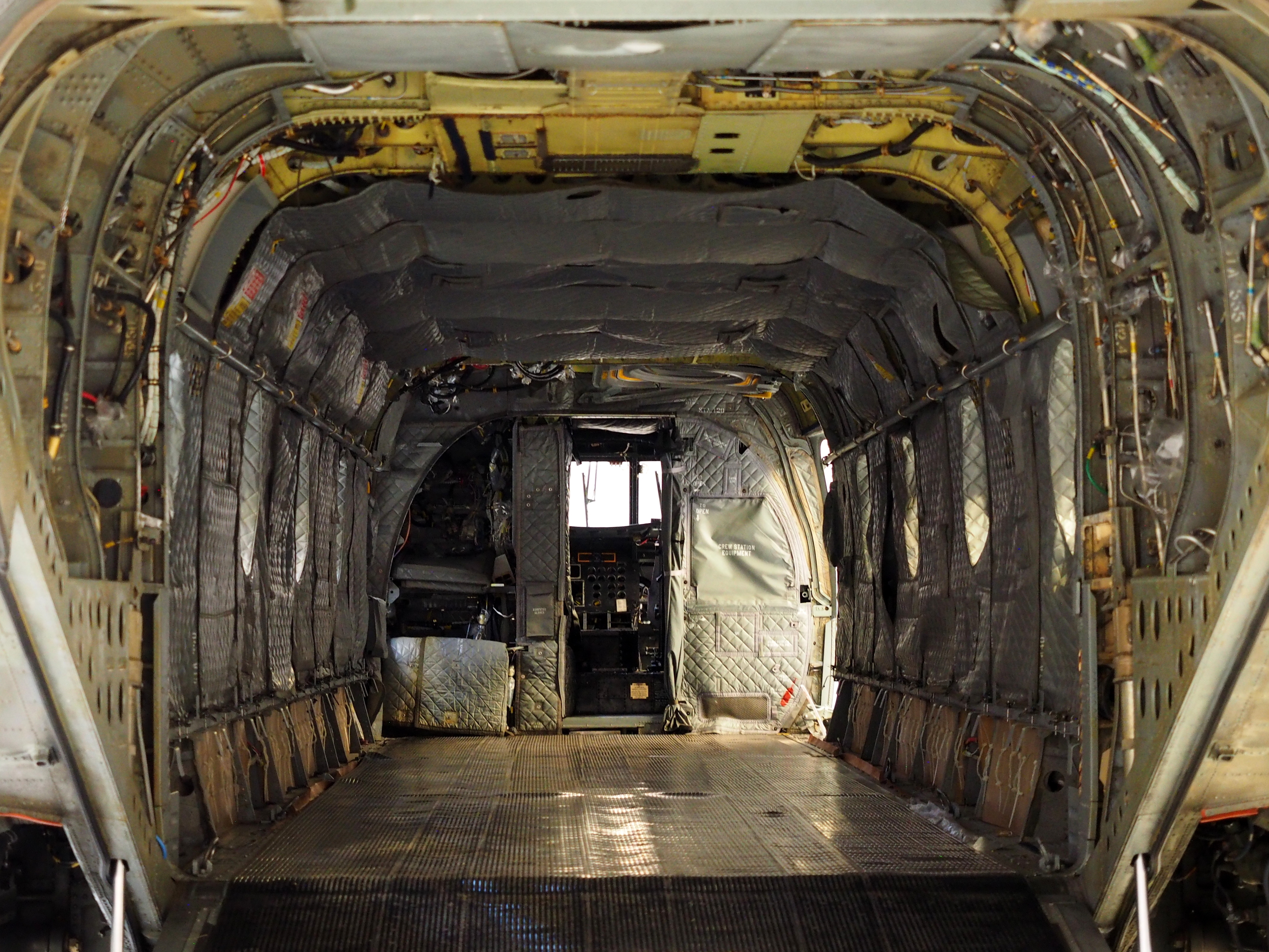
Interior of Bravo November, 2022 at RAF Museum

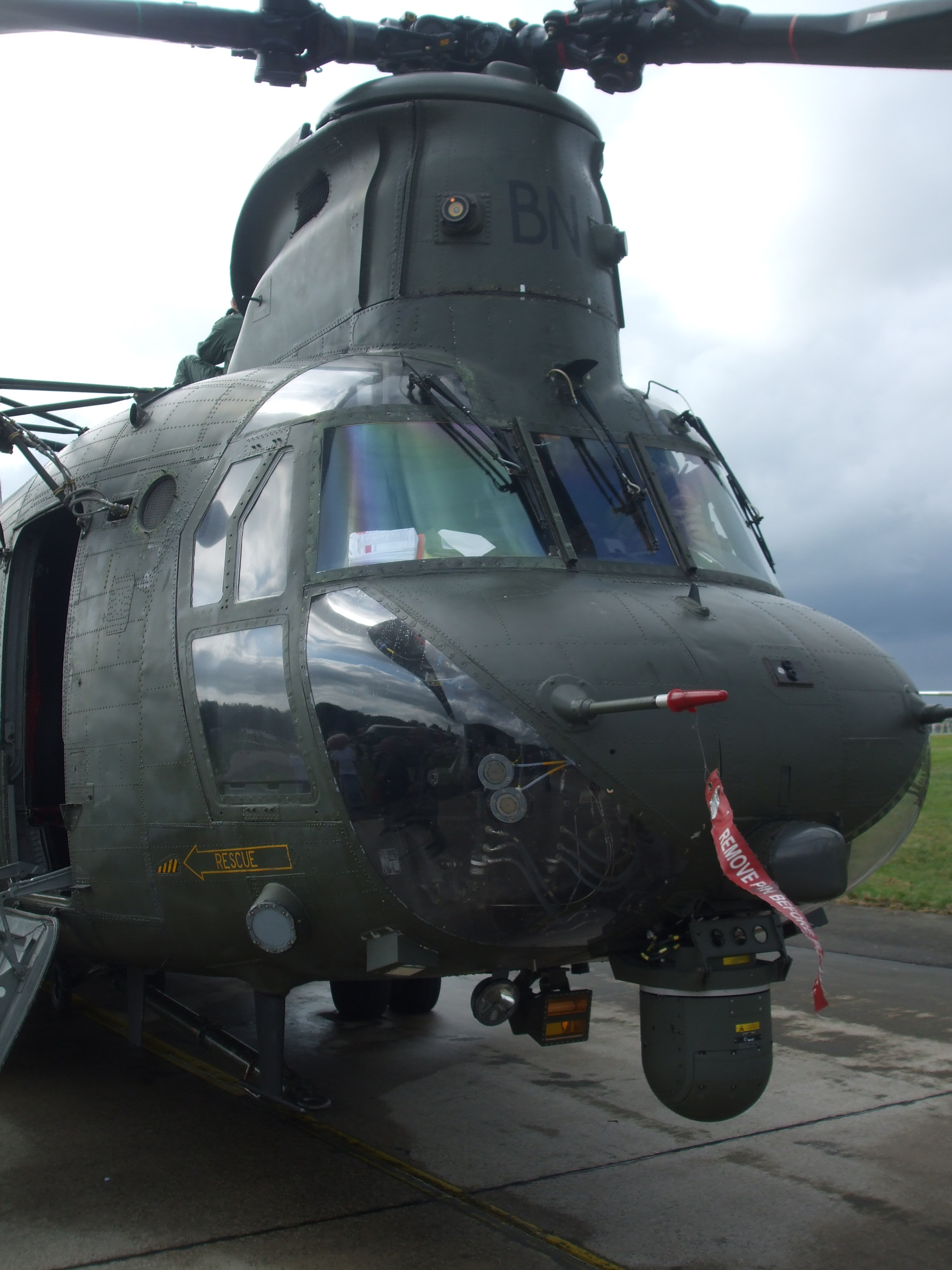
Nose of the helicopter, in 2013

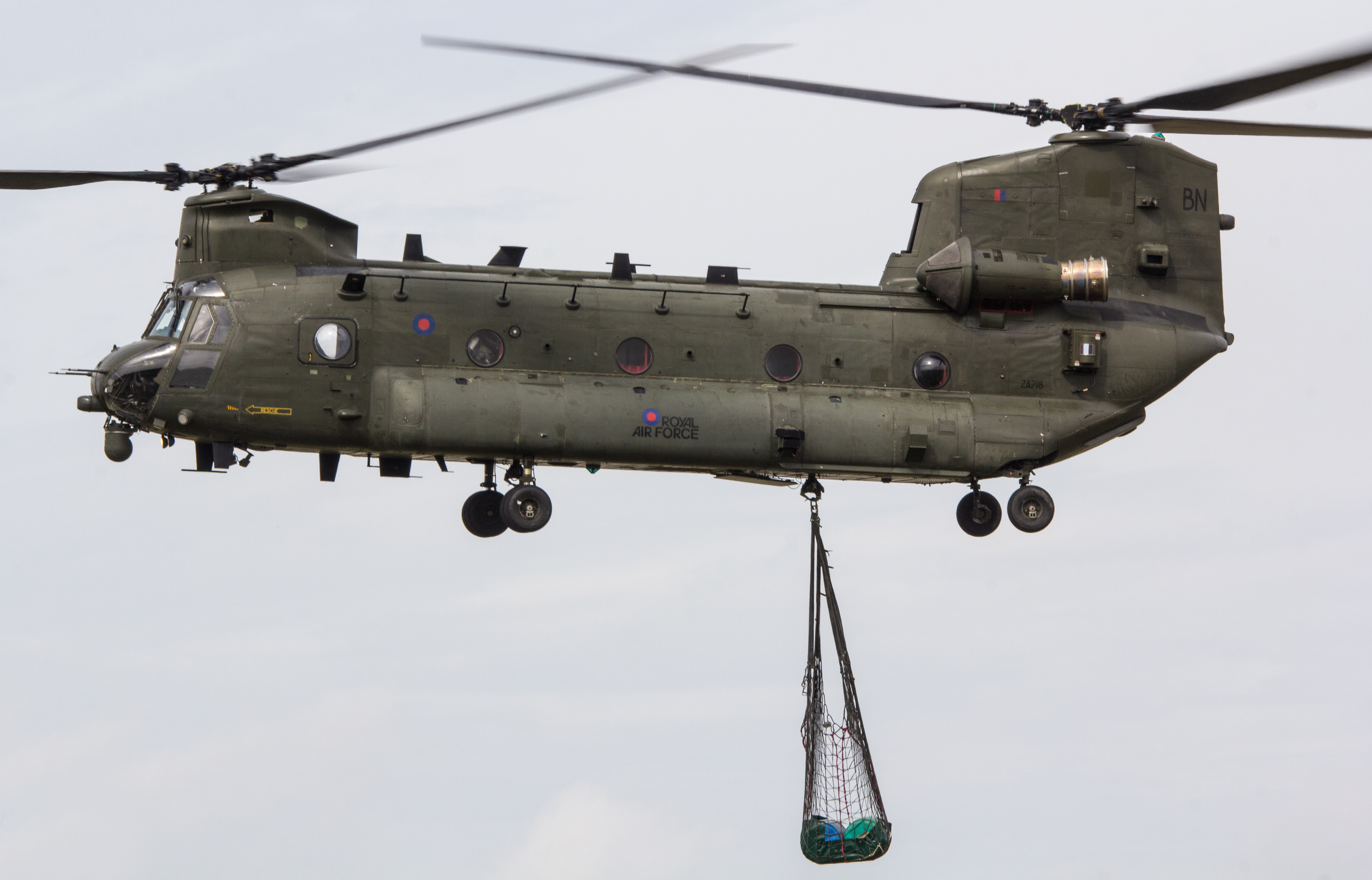
Hauling a slung load

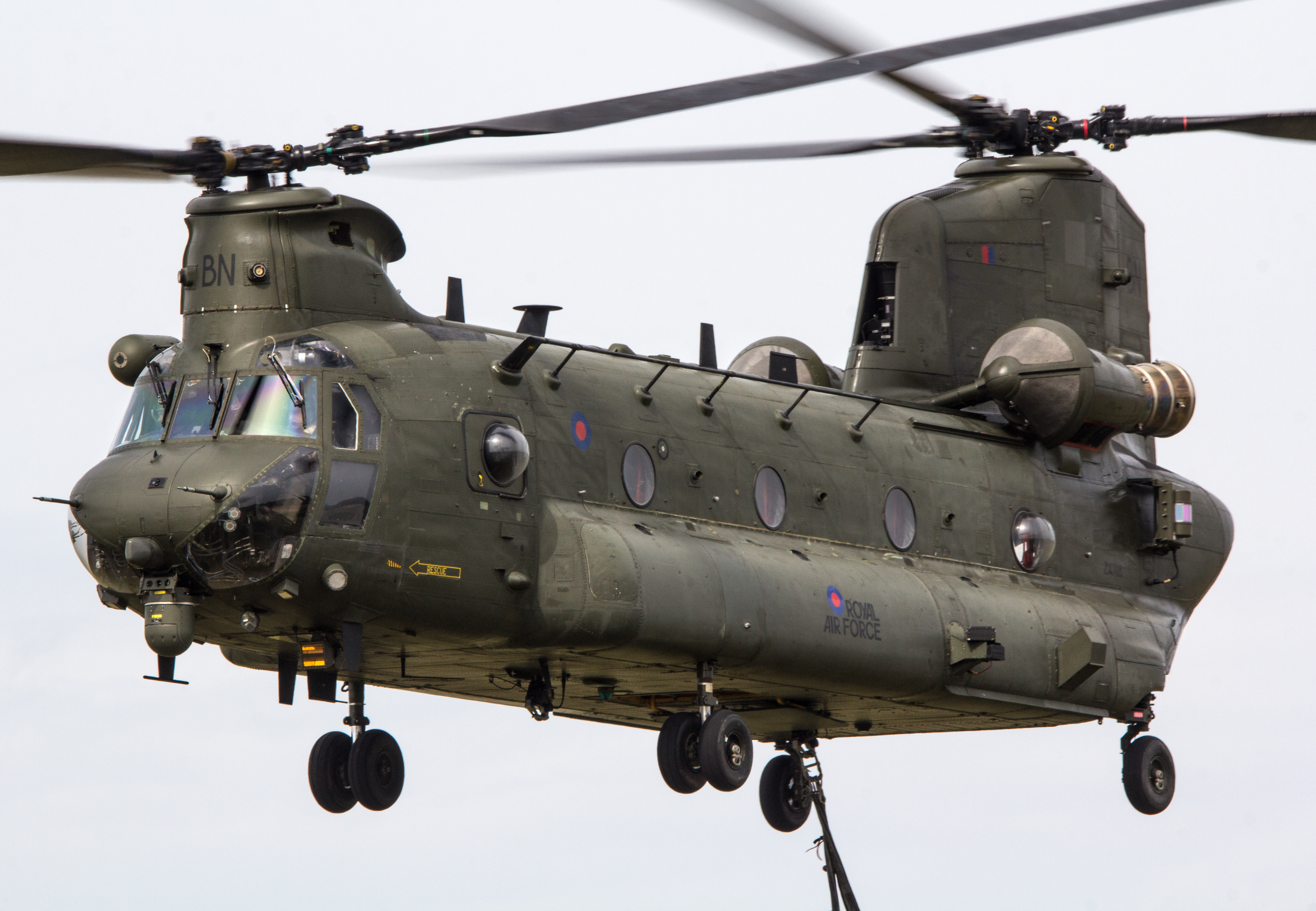
Bravo November in 2013

Bravo November is the original identification code painted on a British Royal Air Force Boeing Chinook HC6A military serial number ZA718. It was one of the original 30 aircraft ordered by the RAF in 1978 and was in service until 2022. It was upgraded several times in its history, eventually being designated as an HC6A airframe. It saw action in every major operation involving the RAF in the helicopter's 39-year service life. Since 1982 it served in the Falkland Islands, Lebanon, Germany, Northern Ireland, Iraq and Afghanistan. The aircraft saw three of its pilots awarded the Distinguished Flying Cross for actions whilst in command of Bravo November.

It first came to the attention of the general public for its survival of the Falklands War. In April 1982 Bravo November was loaded, along with three other Chinooks, aboard the container ship MV Atlantic Conveyor bound for the Falkland Islands on Operation Corporate. Atlantic Conveyor was hit by an Exocet missile, destroying the vessel along with its cargo. Bravo November was on an airborne task at the time and managed to land on HMS Hermes, gaining the nickname The Survivor. It was the only serviceable heavy lift helicopter available to British forces involved in the hostilities. The first of its three Distinguished Flying Crosses came for actions in the Falklands. The aircraft will be the subject of an exhibit at the Royal Air Force Museum Midlands.

== Construction and callsign ==
Thirty Chinooks were ordered by the British Government in 1978 at a price of US$200 million. These helicopters were to become British variants of the United States Army's Boeing CH-47 Chinook. ZA718 was one of the final HC1s the RAF received in February 1982. The U.S. Army introduced an upgraded Chinook, the CH-47D in the 1980s with improvements including upgraded engines, composite rotor blades, a redesigned cockpit to reduce pilot workload, redundant and improved electrical systems, an advanced flight control system (FCS) and improved avionics. The RAF designation for this new standard of aircraft was the Chinook HC2 with ZA718 becoming the first RAF airframe to be converted in 1993–94. Bravo November has been refitted and upgraded numerous times during its service in the British Armed Forces. There are few parts of the original aircraft that survive today, though the "main fuselage, the manufacturer's data plate in the cockpit and the RAF's serial number ZA718 clearly emblazoned on the rear of the aircraft remain ever present".

The aircraft has had a number of callsigns and designations throughout its career. It had the Boeing construction number of B-849 with the RAF airframe number of ZA718 which is still visible at the rear of the aircraft. The squadron code number of the aircraft has varied with the squadron in which it serves. The most famous code was Bravo November (BN, pronounced as in the NATO phonetic alphabet) which it had during the Falklands War and has been associated with it ever since.

== Career ==
Bravo November has had a distinguished career within the Royal Air Force serving in every conflict of the last 30 years and had three of its pilots awarded the Distinguished Flying Cross for actions whilst at the controls of the aircraft.

=== Falklands War ===
In April 1982, Bravo November, along with three other Chinooks from No. 18 Squadron RAF, was loaded aboard the container ship SS Atlantic Conveyor bound for the Falkland Islands. The ship also carried, six Wessex helicopters from 848 NAS, eight Sea Harriers from 809 NAS and six Harrier GR.3s from No. 1 Squadron RAF. Also aboard was all the second-line maintenance equipment and stores needed for support.

The Chinooks had their rotor blades removed and stowed inside the airframes. The aircraft were then sealed in rubberised jackets to protect them during transit. While en route to the Falklands, technicians refitted the rotor blades, a first for such a complex operation at sea.

On 25 May 1982, Atlantic Conveyor was hit by two Exocet missiles launched by Argentine Navy Super Étendards. The missiles started fires, which engulfed the ship and caused it to sink with the loss of 12 crew. Bravo November, was airborne at the time and landed on the aircraft carrier HMS Hermes, earning the nickname “The Survivor”.

The sinking of Atlantic Conveyor left British forces with only one heavy-lift helicopter, with no spares, service manuals, lubricants or tools available. Despite this, the aircraft was able to transport approximately 1,500 troops, 95 casualties, 650 prisoners of war and 550 tonnes of cargo.

The first Distinguished Flying Cross was awarded for actions in the Falklands War. ZA718, was on a night mission, piloted by Squadron Leader Dick Langworthy with co-pilot Flight Lieutenant Andy Lawless. Bravo November descended after losing visibility in a snowstorm, when due to a faulty altimeter, the helicopter struck the sea at ~100 knots (185 km/h). The impact caused spray to enter the engines and tore off the co-pilot’s door, damaging antennas and communications equipment. Despite these conditions, Langworthy managed to regain control and return to San Carlos for inspection. The incident resulted in dents to the fuselage and damage to radio systems. Langworthy was awarded the DFC for his actions during the campaign, but died of a heart attack less than a year later at Port San Carlos, while serving as the detachment commander.

=== Iraq War ===
Twenty years after the Falklands conflict Bravo November saw service in Iraq, being the first British helicopter to land Royal Marines ashore. After departing from HMS Ark Royal, Bravo November landed the first Royal Marines on to the al-Faw peninsula to seize oil-pumping facilities before Iraqi troops could destroy them. The second DFC for actions at the controls of Bravo November was awarded to Squadron Leader Steve Carr for his role in an operation in Iraq. Bravo November was tasked with delivering the Marines to the landing sites marked by US special forces before returning for more troops, guns and freight. The aircraft was being flown at an altitude of less than 100 ft with restricted visibility due to dust clouds thrown up by American armoured forces.

=== Afghanistan conflict ===
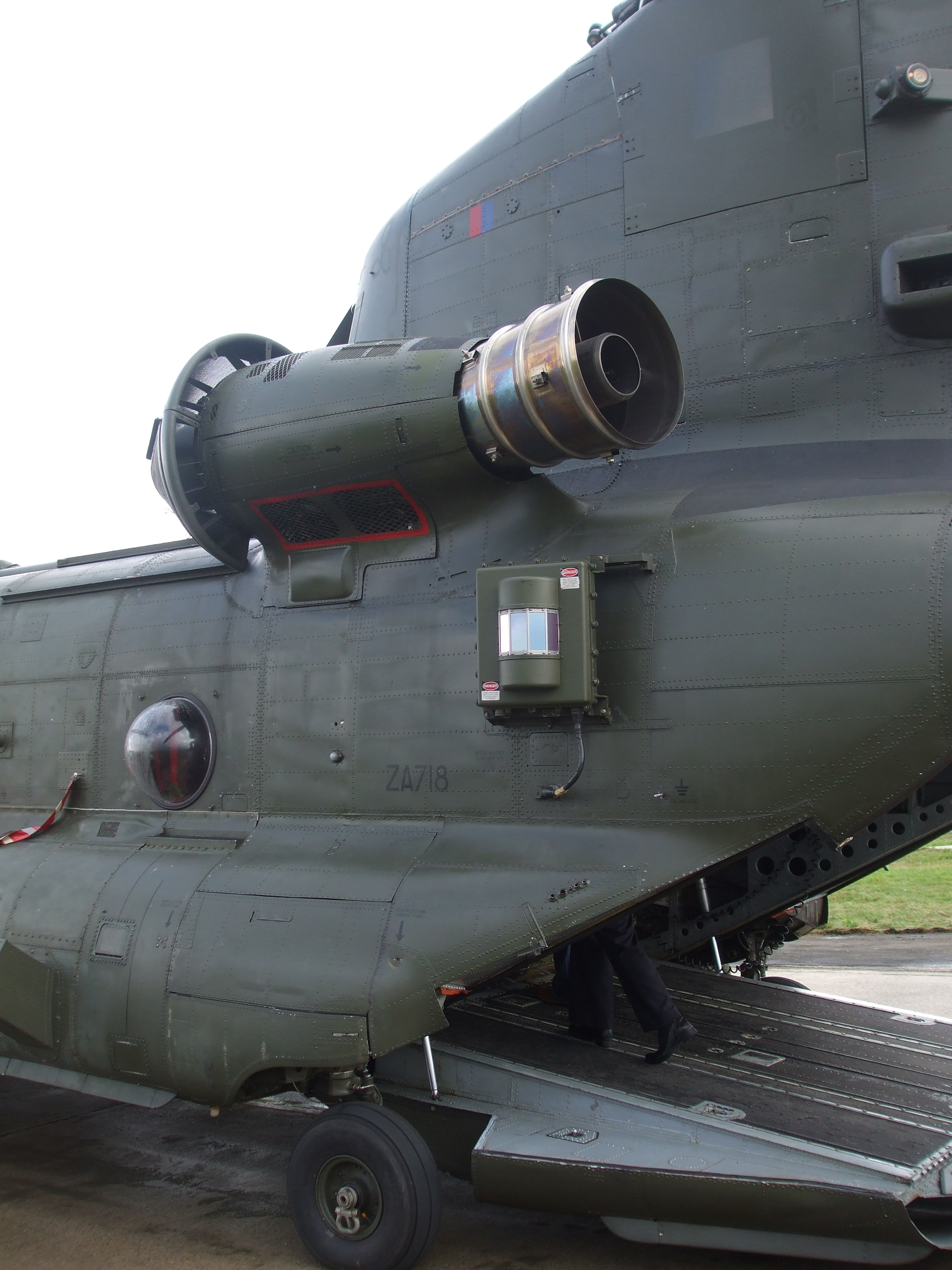
Rear fuselage with left hand side engine of ZA718, Nordholz, 2013

It has been widely reported that, in June 2006, whilst serving in the Afghanistan conflict, Flight Lieutenant Craig Wilson received the third Distinguished Flying Cross while Captain of ZA718/BN with 1310 Flt in Helmand Province. Recent research by the RAF Museum and Air Historical Branch in conjunction with Craig Wilson has, however, confirmed that he was in fact flying a different Chinook during the operations that resulted in the award of his Distinguished Flying Cross.

In 2010, Bravo November was involved in another incident while on service in Afghanistan when pilot Flight Lieutenant Ian Fortune was hit by a ricochet from a bullet fired by Taliban fighters during an extraction of injured soldiers. Flt Lt Fortune landed the helicopter in a "hot zone" that was under heavy Taliban fire. After landing, the aircraft was hit numerous times. One round ricocheted and hit Fortune's helmet at the attaching point for the night vision goggles (NVGs) and smashed the visor. He stayed in control of the aircraft and continued to rescue his wounded colleagues and land his damaged helicopter. For his actions he was awarded the third Distinguished Flying Cross in the history of the aircraft.

Bravo November returned from Afghanistan in 2010.

The helicopter was retired from service in March 2022, as part of a project to replace the RAF's nine oldest Chinooks with more modern CH-47F variants. After leaving service the helicopter was prepared for display at the RAF Museum Cosford.

== Legacy ==
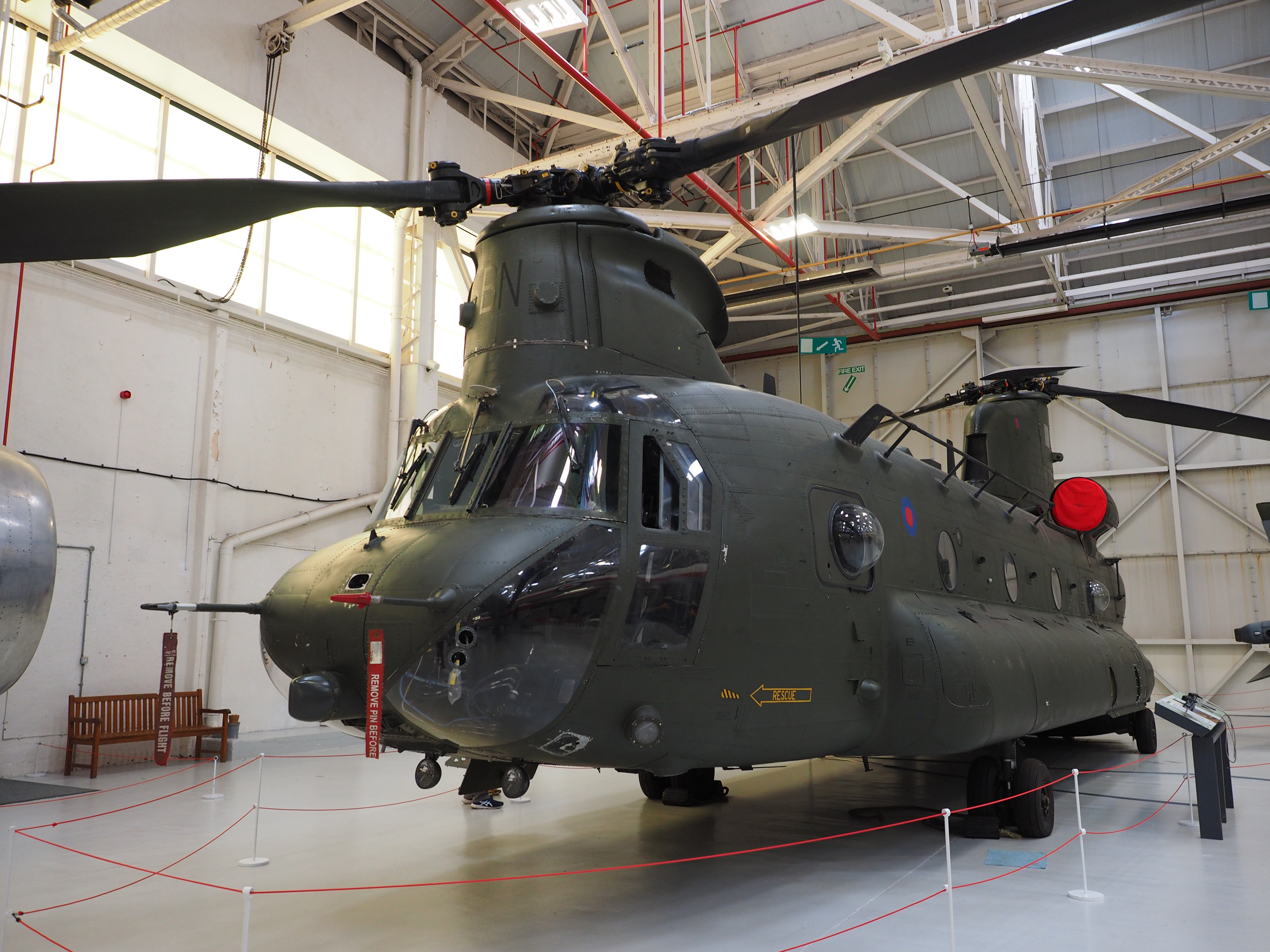
Bravo November on display at RAF Museum Cosford in 2022

At the RAF Museum in London there is a forward fuselage of a former United States Army Chinook painted to represent "Bravo November – the RAF's Most Famous Chinook". The museum's fine art collection also houses a painting by Joe Naujokas, depicting two of the DFCs obtained by Bravo November's crewmembers. The painting was presented to the Royal Air Force Museum by Sir Michael Jenkins, president of Boeing UK, on 9 December 2004.

In April 2022 the aircraft was transported to RAF Museum Cosford (now Royal Air Force Museum Midlands), and will be displayed in a new exhibition, due to open in the summer of 2027.
