= Boeing Chinook (UK variants) =

Series of military transport helicopters

Chinook
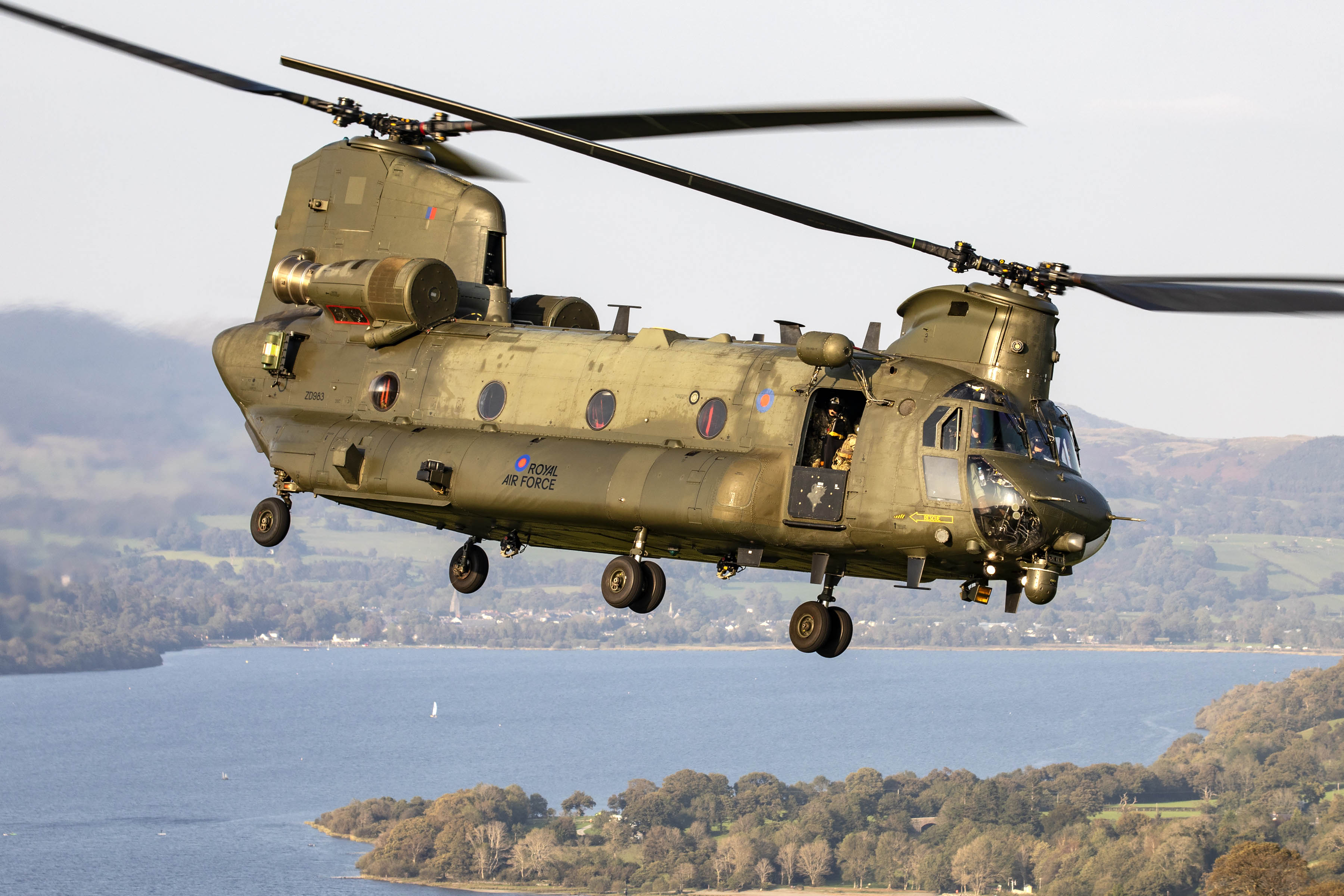
- Chinook HC6A of 18 Sqn RAF in 2020

General information
- Type: Transport helicopter
- Manufacturer: Boeing Defense, Space & Security
- Designer: Boeing-Vertol
- Status: In service
- Primary user: Royal Air Force
- Number built: 72 (all RAF models)

History
- Introduction date: 22 November 1980 (with RAF)
- First flight: 23 March 1980 (HC1)
- Developed from: Boeing CH-47 Chinook
- Variants: HC1, HC1B, HC2, HC3, HC4, HC5, HC6, HC6A, HC7

The Boeing Chinook is a large, tandem rotor helicopter operated by the Royal Air Force (RAF). A series of variants based on the United States Army's Boeing CH-47 Chinook, the RAF Chinook fleet is the largest outside the United States. RAF Chinooks have seen extensive service in the Falklands War, the Balkans, Northern Ireland, Iraq, and Afghanistan.

The Chinook, normally based at RAF Odiham and RAF Benson, in Oxfordshire, has provided heavy-lift support and transport across all branches of the British armed forces since the early 1980s. The RAF has a total of fifty-four Chinooks in active inventory as of 2025. In 2018, the UK issued a request to the United States to purchase fourteen additional rotorcraft. The Chinook is expected to remain in RAF service until the 2040s.

== Design and development ==
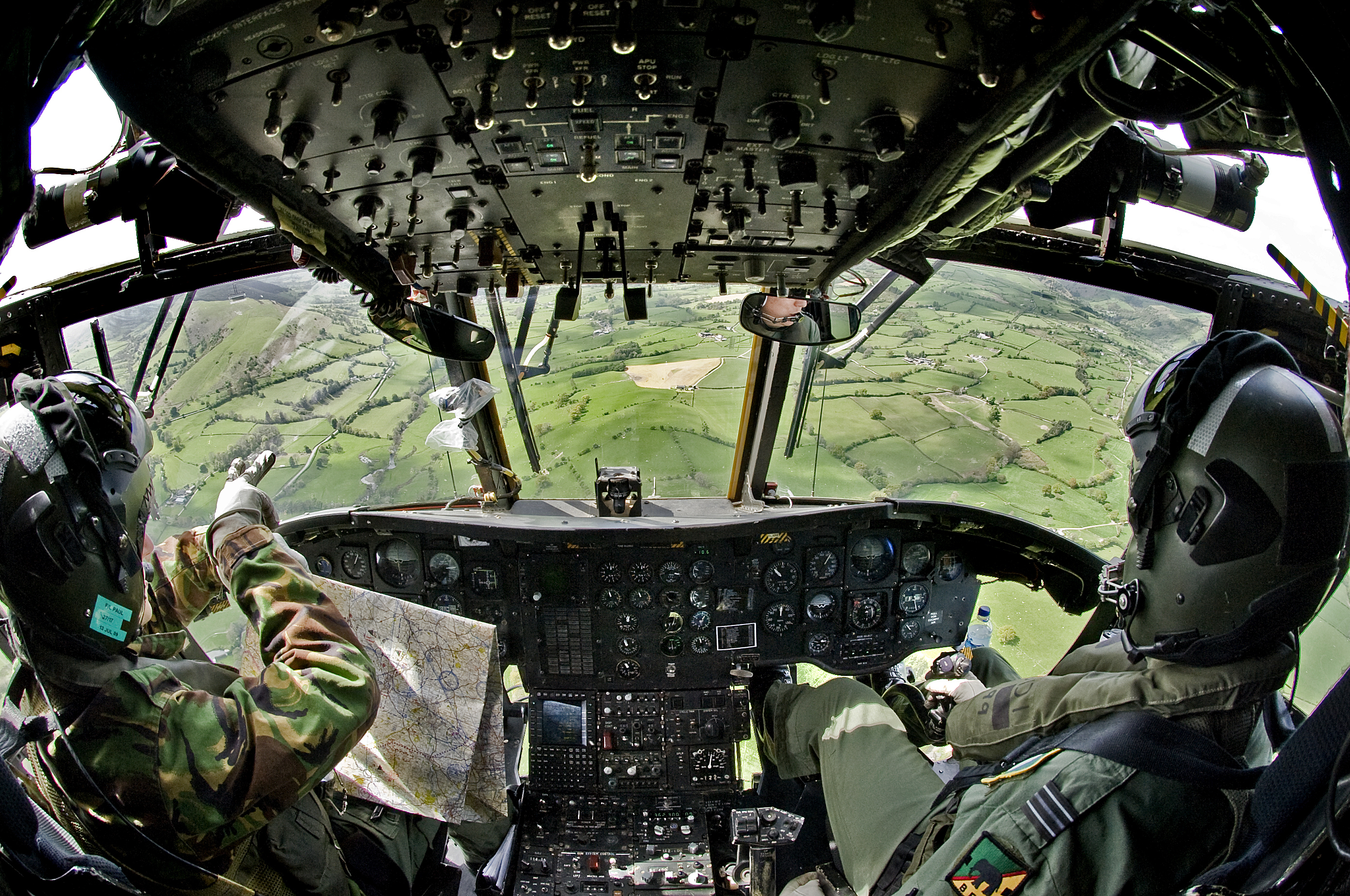
Cockpit view of an RAF Chinook on a training flight over Wales, 2009

=== Chinook HC1 ===
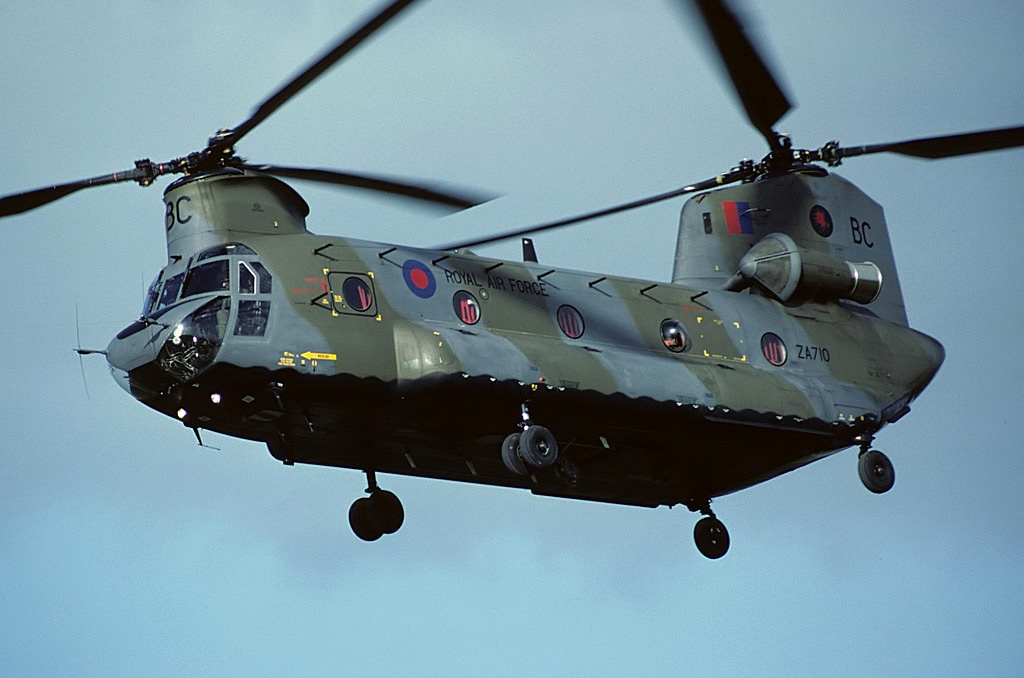
Chinook HC1 of Royal Air Force, 1982

In March 1967, the United Kingdom placed an order for fifteen Boeing Vertol CH-47B Chinook to replace the Royal Air Force's Bristol Belvedere HC.1 fleet. In British service the new aircraft was to be designated as the Chinook HC Mk 1 (also formatted as HC.1 or HC1) standing for Helicopter, Cargo Mark 1. However in November of that year, the order was cancelled in a review of defence spending.

UK Chinook procurement ambitions were revived in 1978 with an announced requirement for a new heavy-lift helicopter to replace the Westland Wessex. Thirty-three Chinooks were ordered at a price of US$200 million. These helicopters, comparable to the CH-47C with Lycoming T55-L-11E engines, were again designated Chinook HC1, and entered service in December 1980. By 1984, there had been 4 losses of HC.1s including 3 on the Atlantic Conveyor and ZA676 having crashed on a training sortie. Eight more HC.1s were ordered and delivered from 1984 to 1986, with the CH-47D's Lycoming T55-L-712 turboshaft engines.

Starting in 1993, 32 surviving HC.1B aircraft were later returned to Boeing and updated to the Chinook HC2 standard for further service within the RAF.

=== Chinook HC2 ===
The next generation Chinook, the CH-47D, entered service with the US Army in 1982. Improvements from the CH-47C included upgraded engines, composite rotor blades, a redesigned cockpit to reduce pilot workload, redundant and improved electrical systems, an advanced flight control system (FCS) and improved avionics. The RAF returned their original HC1 fleet, which already had CH-47D engines, to Boeing for complete upgrade to CH-47D standard, the first of which returned to the UK in 1993 under the designation Chinook HC2.

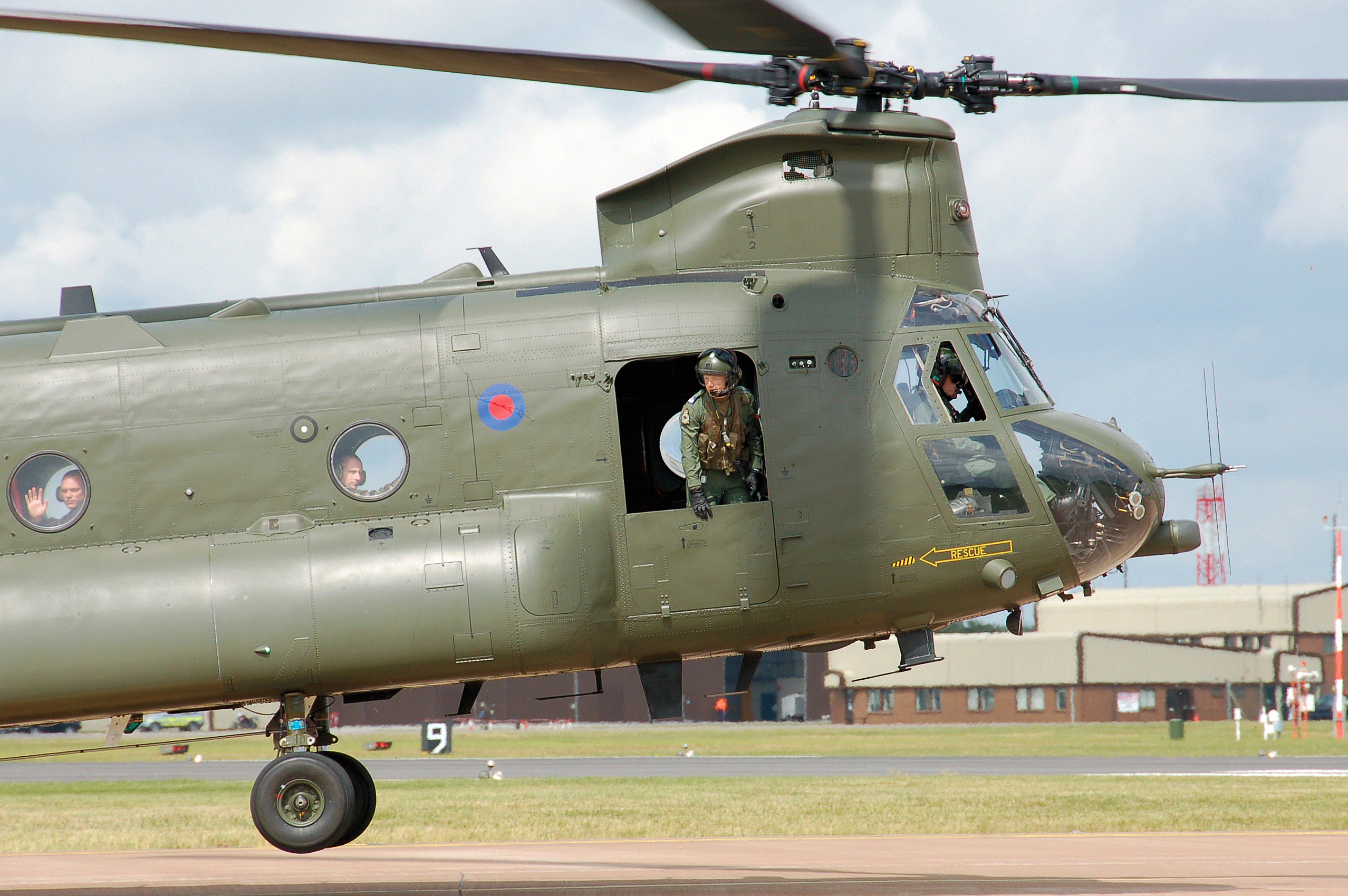
RAF Chinook HC2 in 2009

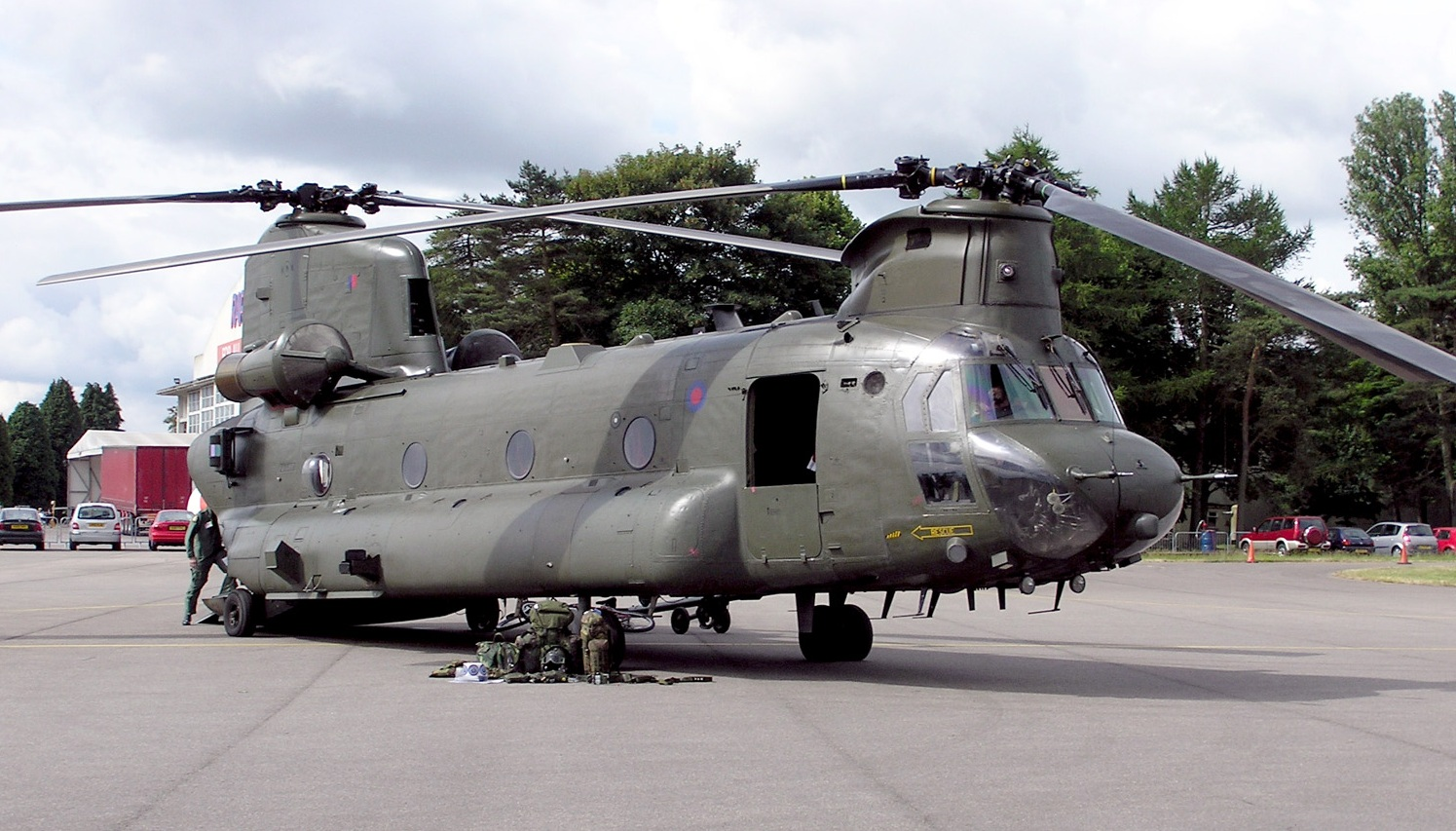
RAF Chinook HC2 in 2008

Three additional Chinook HC2s were ordered with delivery beginning in 1995 (ZH775-777). Another six brand new Chinooks were ordered in 1995 under the Chinook HC2A designation (ZH891-896); the main difference between these and the standard HC2 was the strengthening of the front fuselage to allow the fitting of an aerial refuelling probe in future.

In 2006, the retirement dates for the HC2 and HC2A fleets were scheduled for 2015 and 2025 respectively, but planned upgrades were implemented allowing them to continue to fly until 2040.

=== Chinook HC3 ===
Eight advanced Chinooks were ordered in 1995 for delivery in 2000 as dedicated special forces helicopters, which were intended to be low-cost variants of the US Army's MH-47E; these were designated Chinook HC.3 in RAF service. The HC3s include improved range, night vision sensors and navigation capability. The eight aircraft were to cost £259 million and the forecast in-service date was November 1998. Although delivered in 2001, the HC3 could not receive airworthiness certificates as it was not possible to certify the avionics software.

The programme was widely judged to be "a profoundly inept piece of procurement": Sir Peter Spencer, who as head of the Defence Procurement Agency inherited the project, said that the "original requirement was ... actually impossible. I mean, there were 100 essential requirements. I read all of them. One of them said to give protection against any missile coming from any direction." Spencer later commented: "it is always hard to imagine why people think you would be able cost effectively to buy a bespoke requirement for a very small production run."

The avionics were unsuitable due to poor risk analysis and necessary requirements omitted from the procurement contract. The Times claimed that the Ministry of Defence (MOD) planned to perform software integration itself, without Boeing's involvement, in order to reduce costs. While lacking certification, the helicopters were only permitted to fly in visual meteorological conditions and subsequently stored in climate controlled hangars. In 2004, Edward Leigh, then Chairman of the Public Accounts Committee described it as "One of the most incompetent procurements of all time."

Air Forces Monthly reported in November 2006 that after protracted negotiations to allow them to enter service, the Defence Aviation Repair Agency would likely receive a contract to install the Thales "TopDeck" avionics system on the Chinook HC3s. However, the MOD announced in March 2007 that this so-called "Fix to Field" programme would be cancelled, and instead it would revert the helicopters' avionics to Chinook HC2/2A specification. The programme was estimated to cost £50–60 million. In June 2008, the National Audit Office issued a scathing report on the MOD's handling of the affair, stating that the whole programme was likely to cost £500 million by the time the helicopters enter service. On 6 July 2009, the first of the eight modified Chinook HC3s made its first test flight at MOD Boscombe Down as part of the flight testing and evaluation phase of the HC3 "reversion" programme.

=== Chinook HC4 & HC5 - Project Julius ===
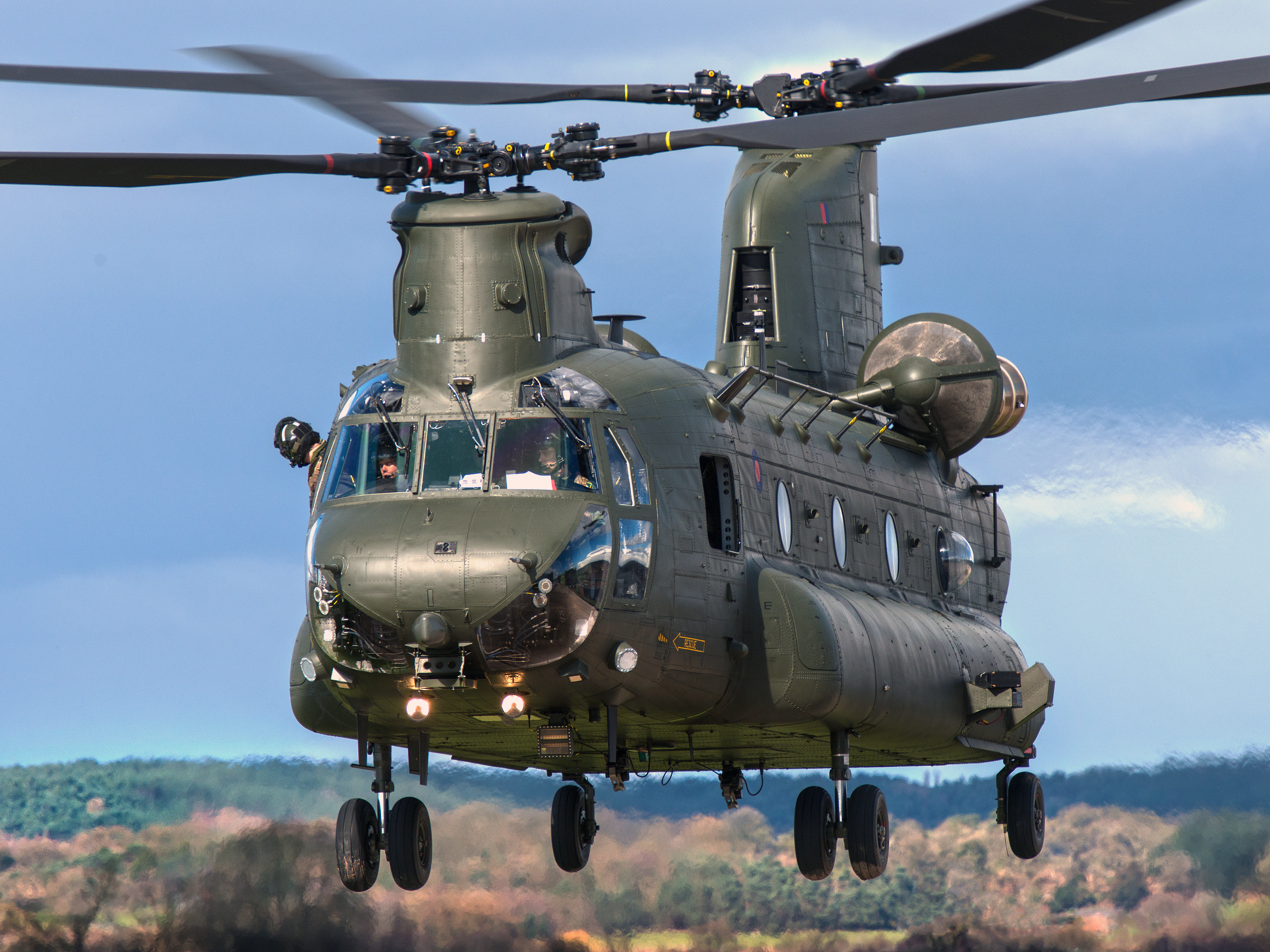
HC4 landing at Shawbury in 2016

A programme to upgrade forty-six Chinook HC2/2A and HC3 helicopters was initiated in December 2008. Known as Project Julius, it included new digital flight deck avionics based on the Thales TopDeck avionics suite, comprising new multifunction displays, a digital moving map display and an electronic flight bag, installation of a nose-mounted forward-looking infrared (FLIR) detector, and upgrading the engines to the more powerful T55-714 standard. Upgraded HC2/2A and HC3 aircraft were redesignated Chinook HC4 and Chinook HC5 respectively. Deliveries were expected to commence in 2011. The first conversion, a Chinook HC4, first flew on 9 December 2010. Initial operating capability status was reached in June 2012 with seven aircraft delivered.

=== Chinook HC6A ===
In July 2017, it was announced that the thirty-eight Chinook HC4s were to be upgraded to a modernised standard designated Chinook HC6A including the replacement of the analogue flight control systems with the Boeing Digital Automatic Flight Control System (DAFCS). By February 2022, no HC4 variants remained in service.

=== Chinook HC6 ===
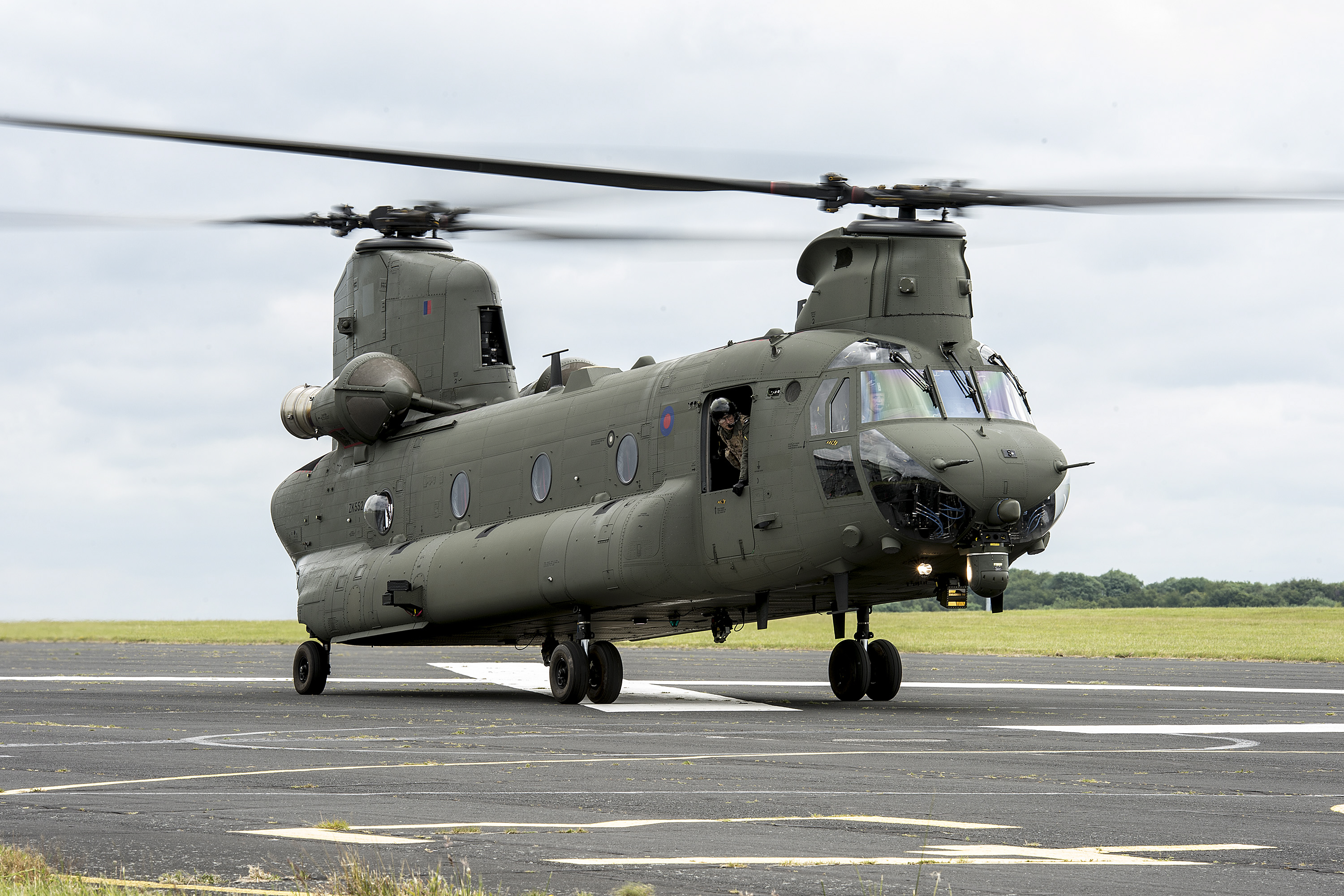
Chinook HC6 makes its first flight, June 2014

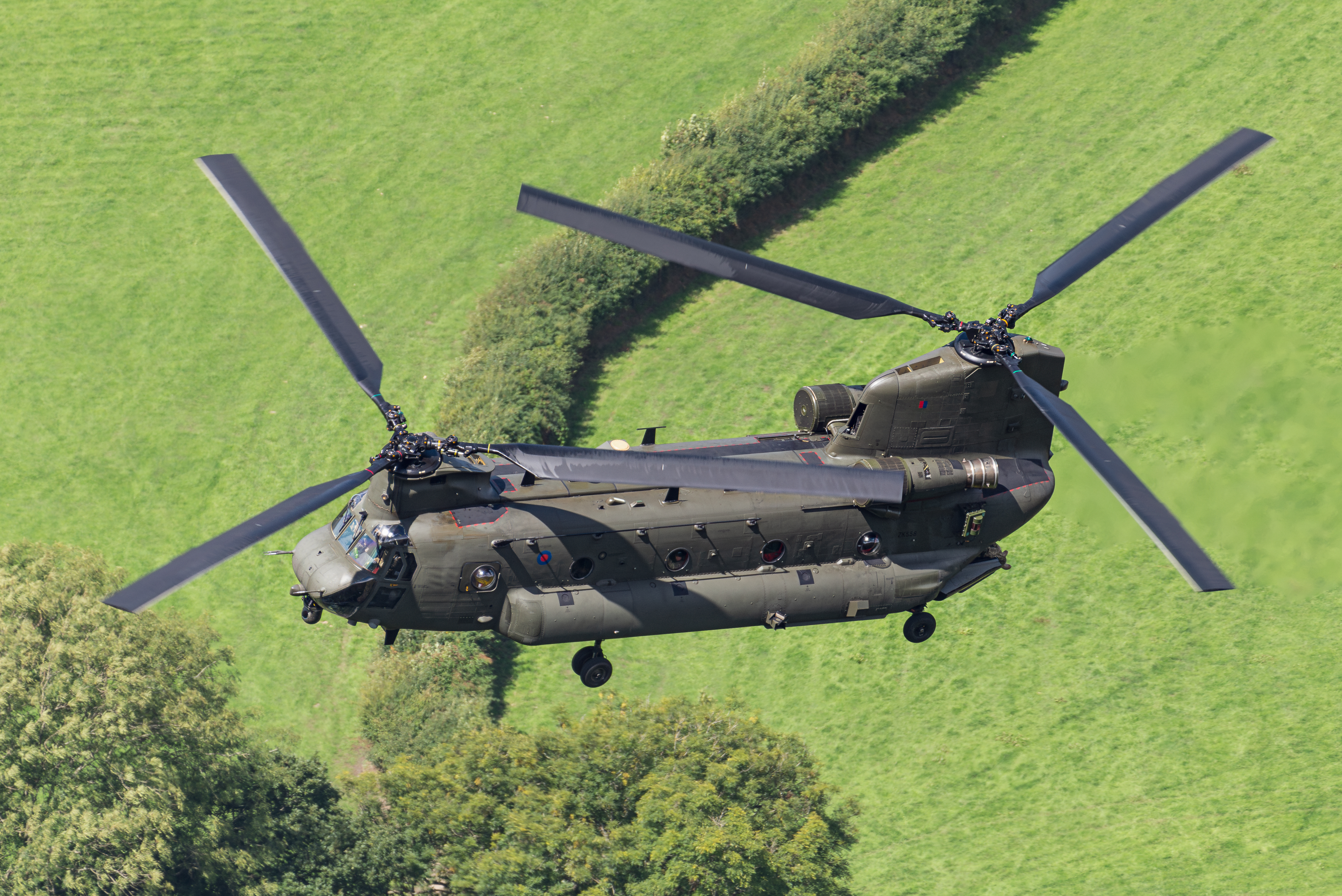
RAF Chinook HC.6

The Chinook HC6 designation was assigned to twenty-four (later reduced to fourteen) new build CH-47F-derived Chinooks ordered in 2009. In December 2015, the fourteenth and final HC6 was delivered to the RAF.

By February 2022 the fleet of 60 Chinooks consisted of 8x HC5, 14x HC6 and 38x HC6A variants.

=== Chinook H-47(ER) ===
In March 2024, the MoD announced its intention to purchase 14 new build Chinook Block II Extended Range (ER) models at the cost of £1.4 billion. This new model, will be designated H-47(ER), will have twice the range of the 14 oldest RAF Chinooks they will replace and will be predominantly used for special operations. The H-47(ER) will be fitted with the T55-GA-714A 4,777 shp (3,562 kW) turboshaft engine used on the CH-47F. Increased Lift & Payload resulting from redesigned, strengthened fuselage, allowing for an increase in maximum gross weight to approximately 54,000 lbs. Fuel System Improvements: Redesigned fuel tanks and upgraded systems extend the mission radius, crucial for Special Operations. Advanced Avionics see the introduction of a fully integrated digital cockpit management system (Common Avionics Architecture System) enhance performance and reduce operating costs. Special Operations Equipment: Retains and upgrades specialized equipment including in-flight refuel. The Ministry of Defence has confirmed that the RAF’s incoming Chinook H-47(ER) helicopters will be fitted with full air-to-air refuelling capability, but that current plans do not rely on RAF tankers to provide that support. The on-board communication systems include a high-frequency (HF) radio, a single-channel ground and airborne radio system, four ultra-high-frequency (UHF) /very high-frequency (VHF) radios, a blue force tracking system, an IFF transponder and a digital inter-communication system (DICS).

A defining strength of the H‑47(ER) special operations role is its advanced terrain‑following and terrain‑avoidance capability, enabling the aircraft to fly low, fast, and safely without sacrificing survivability in poor weather or darkness. Central to this is the AN/APQ‑187 Silent Knight radar a low‑probability‑of‑intercept, low‑probability‑of‑detection multi‑mode system engineered specifically for secure, low‑level flight in demanding environments, including over water and complex terrain.Designed to operate from roughly 100 to 1,000 feet above ground level across a broad speed envelope, the radar provides modes for terrain following and avoidance, weather sensing, ground mapping, and maritime detection. Its compact, single‑box architecture reduces weight and integration burden while giving crews the situational awareness needed to exploit terrain masking and minimise exposure within threat engagement zones.

== Operational history ==
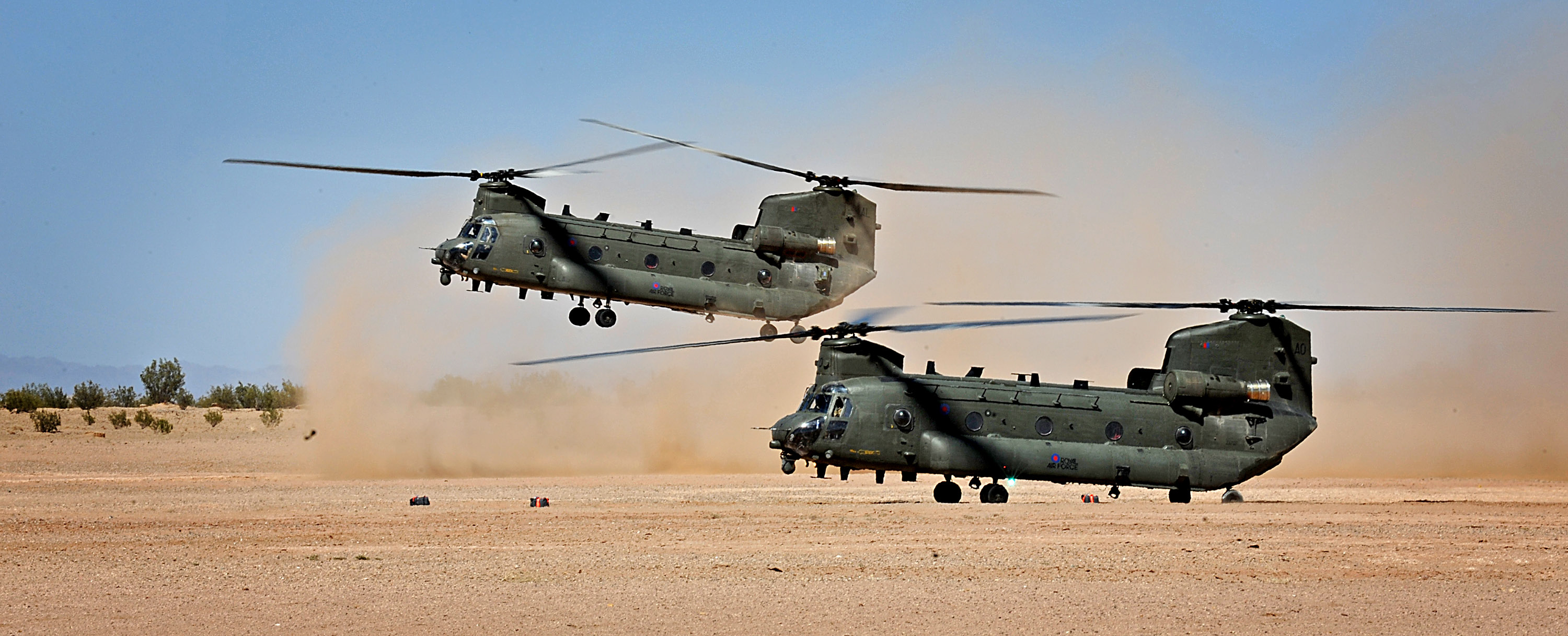
Two RAF Chinooks on exercises in California, 2014

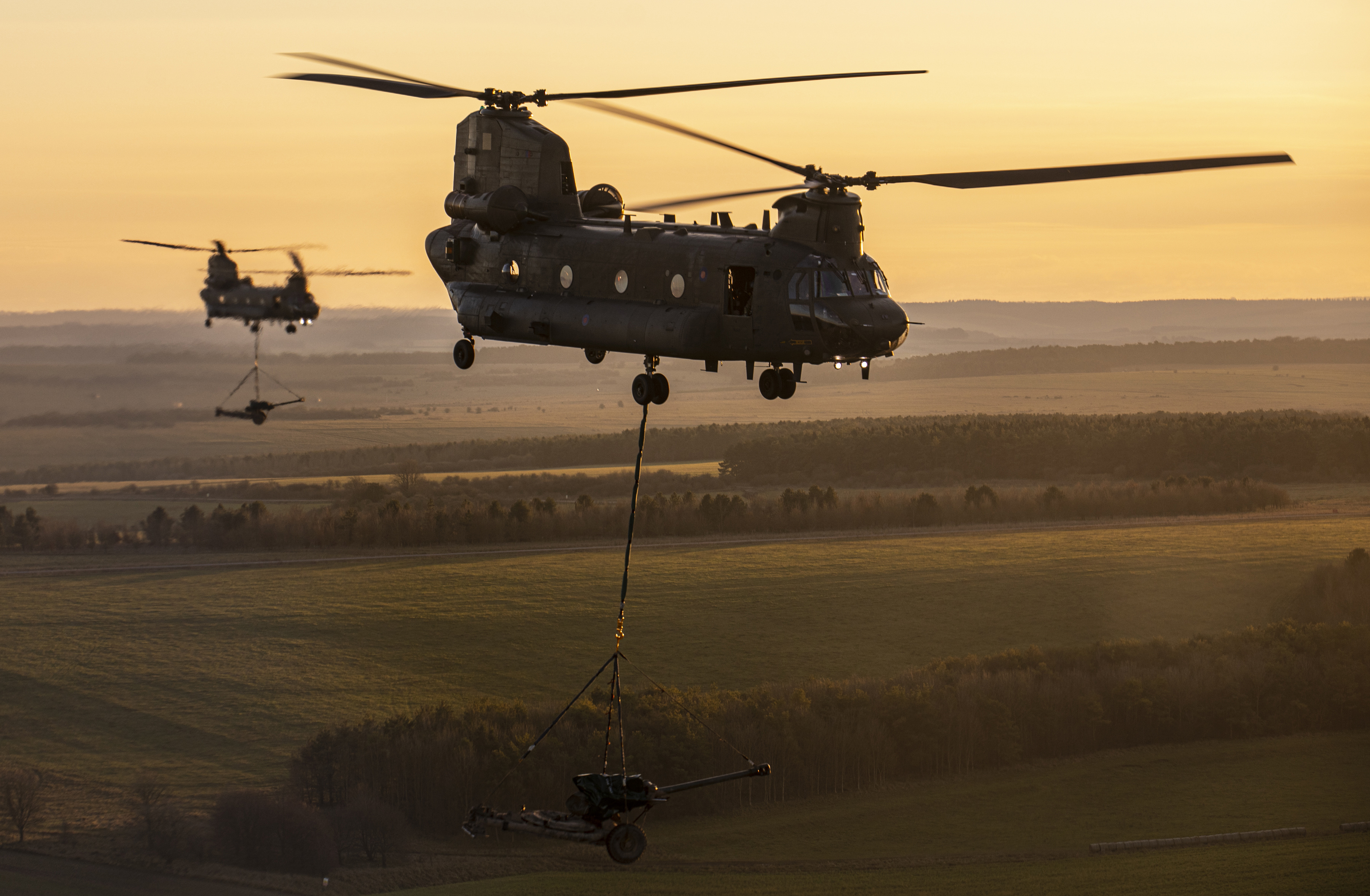
RAF Chinooks during Exercise Decisive Manoeuvre, over Salisbury plain, 2019

RAF Chinooks have been widely deployed in support of British military engagements, serving their first wartime role in Operation Corporate, the Falklands War, in 1982.

Chinooks were used in Operation Granby in the 1991 Gulf War. The Chinook became a vital transit tool during the war. They were used for moving troops into the region at the start of the conflict; a Chinook was used on 22 January 1991 to transport a Special Air Service (SAS) patrol on the famous Bravo Two Zero mission. In the aftermath of the conflict as many as nine British Chinooks delivered food and supplies to thousands of Kurdish refugees from Iraq.

On 10 August 1999, hundreds of Chinooks around the world, including those used by the British armed forces, were grounded due to cracking discovered in the landing gear of a British helicopter during routine inspection.

One Chinook, known by its original squadron code of Bravo November, is a recognized and decorated aircraft due to its service record; it has seen action in a number of major operations involving the RAF in the helicopter's almost 40-year service life, including the Falkland Islands, Lebanon, Germany, Northern Ireland, Iraq, and Afghanistan.

=== Falklands War ===
During the Falklands War, Chinooks were deployed by both the British and Argentinian forces. In April 1982, four Chinooks were loaded aboard the container ship MV Atlantic Conveyor bound for the Falkland Islands, to support the British operations. On 25 May 1982, the Chinook Bravo November was sent to pick up freight from HMS Glasgow. While the helicopter was airborne, Atlantic Conveyor was attacked by an Argentine Navy Dassault Super Étendard with an Exocet sea-skimming missile. Bravo November avoided the ship's destruction, assisted in the evacuation of the ship, and later landed on the aircraft carrier HMS Hermes, gaining the nickname "The Survivor". Owing to the rapid spread of fire and smoke aboard Atlantic Conveyor after the Exocet strike, it was not possible to fly any of the helicopters that remained on the ship's deck. RAF Chinooks were part of an estimated force of forty helicopters in the British task force, alongside Westland Sea King and Westland Wessex helicopters.

One Argentine CH-47C was captured during the Falklands War, and used by the RAF as a training aid. The rear fuselage was later used to repair a crashed RAF Chinook in 2003.

Post-war, four Chinooks were operated by "ChinDet" (Chinook Detachment) which became No.1310 Flight in 1983. Subsequently, No. 78 Squadron was re-formed in 1986 from the merger of No. 1310 Flight and No.1564 Flight (Sea Kings) and operated two Chinooks as part of the Falklands Garrison. This was reduced to a single helicopter in the mid-1990s and the type was eventually withdrawn from the Falklands in 2006, in order to free up resources and aircraft for operations in Afghanistan.

=== Afghanistan ===
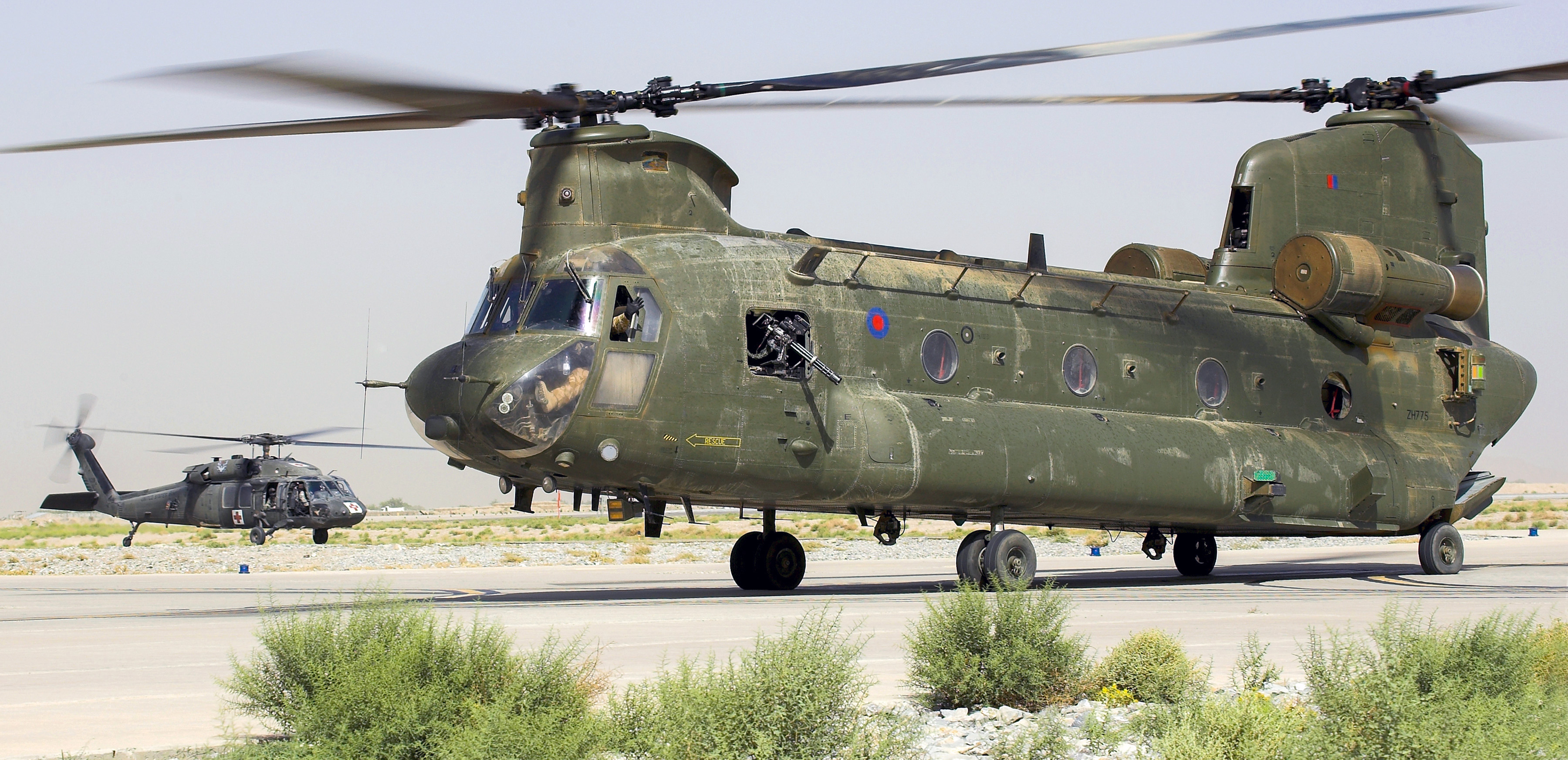
HC2 ZH775 with HH-60M MEDEVAC in background at Kandahar, 2010

Chinook helicopters were relied upon heavily to support the British forces in Afghanistan continuously from the start of the war in Afghanistan in 2001; Operation Snipe saw the helicopters used to assist the 1,000 British Commandos sweeping a region of southeastern Afghanistan. Due to the threat of improvised explosive devices (IEDs) scattered throughout the terrain by insurgents, transport helicopters have become highly valued and demanded units in this style of warfare. By April 2006, six Chinooks had been deployed by C-17A Globemaster III transport aircraft to Kandahar in Southern Afghanistan, in support of Operation Herrick. Two RAF Chinooks were lost in August 2009 during combat operations with the Taliban, one of which was brought down by enemy fire, in spite of warnings months before of Taliban plans to attack the helicopters.

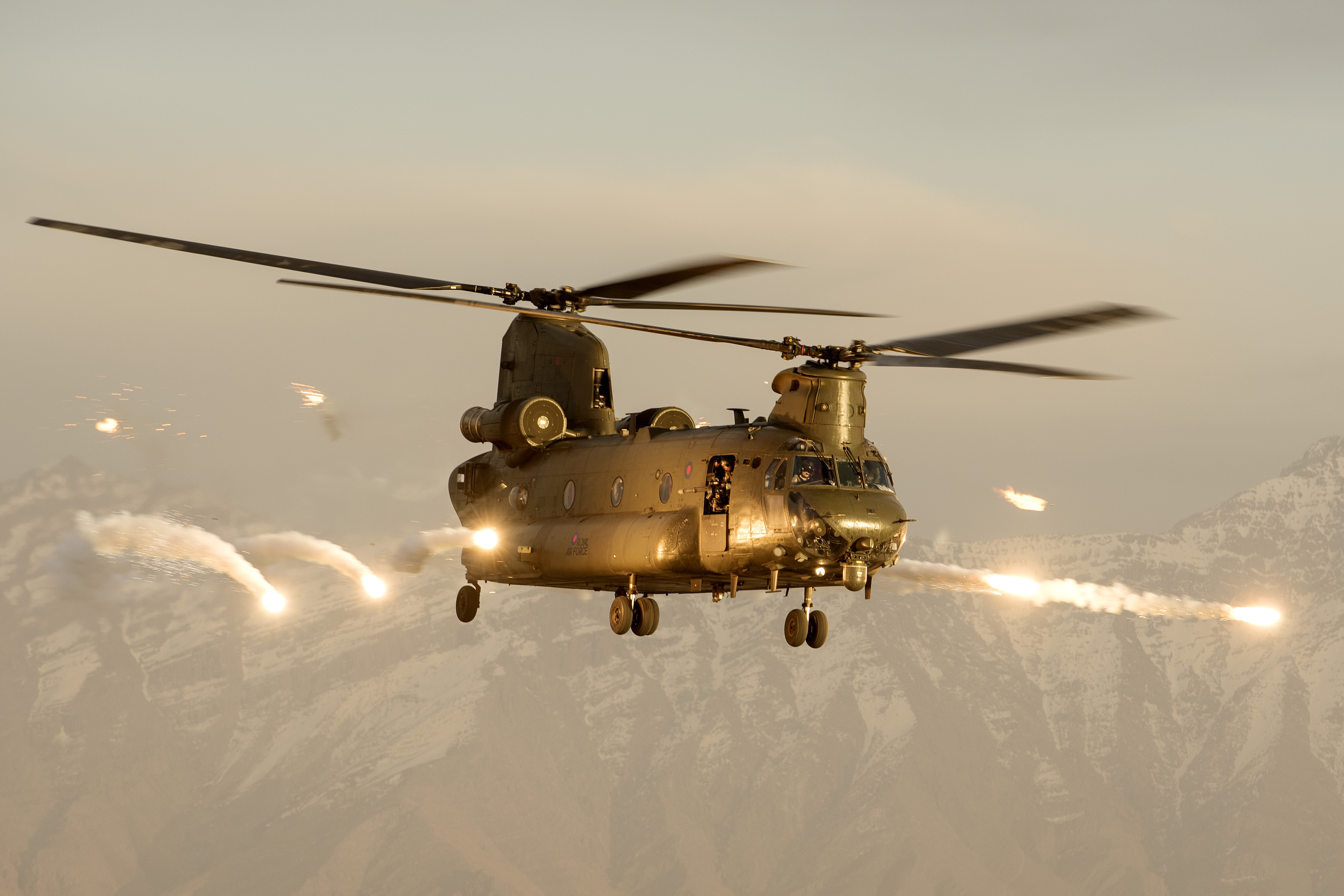
RAF Chinook firing flares over Afghanistan, 2015

The continued operation of the fleet was made more cost effective when maintenance and support regimes were altered in 2006 and 2007. On 15 December 2009, the British government announced its Future Helicopter Strategy including the purchase of twenty-four new build Chinooks, twenty-two to expand the force and two to replace losses in Afghanistan, to be delivered to the RAF from 2012. The number of additional Chinooks was cut by twelve in the Strategic Defence and Security Review 2010. This brought the total fleet size to sixty aircraft; as of 2009, the RAF had forty-eight Chinooks in inventory.

=== Other deployments ===
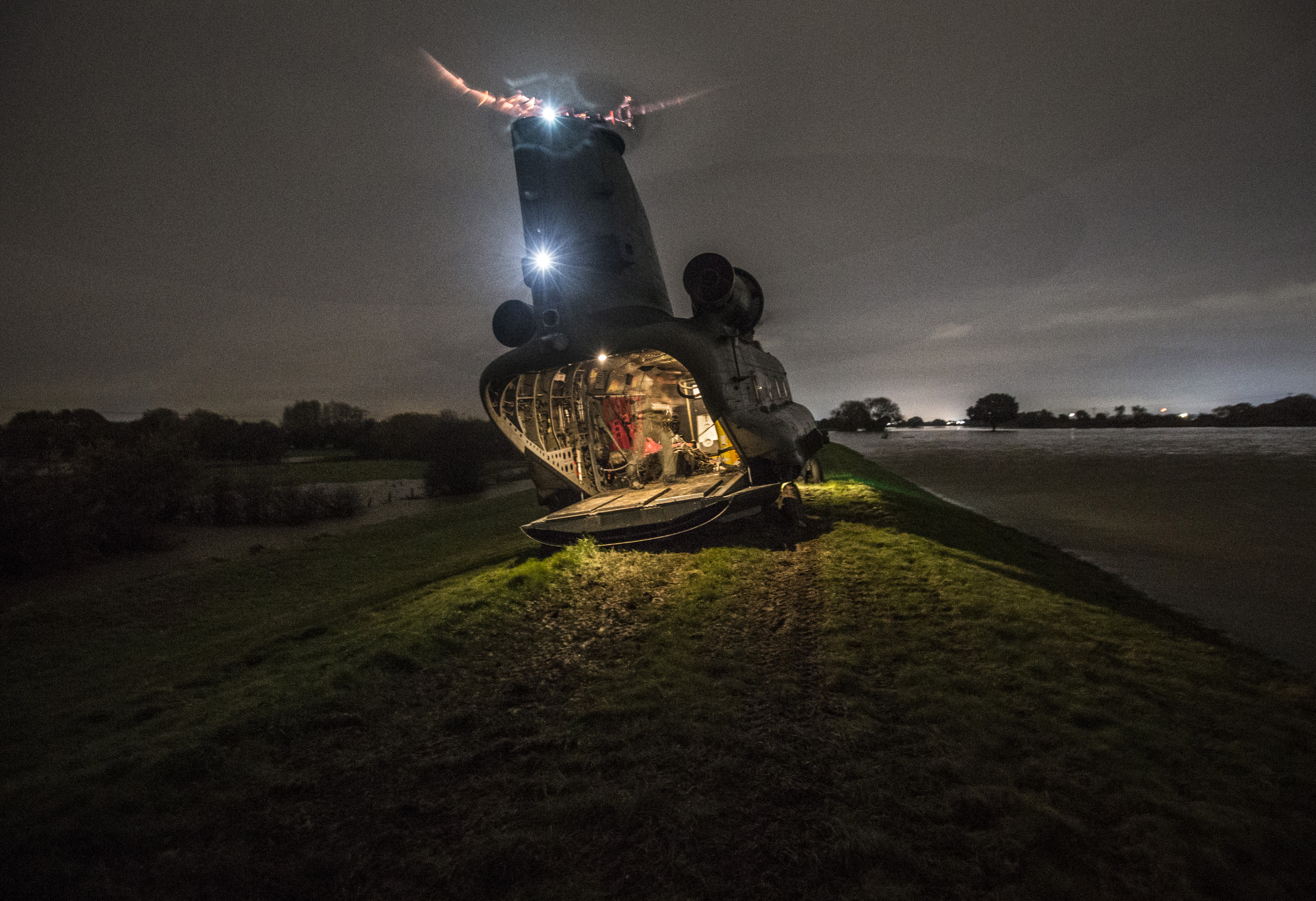
RAF Chinook delivers supplies for flood relief at night, after heavy rainfall around Doncaster (2019)

On 6 June 1999, two Chinooks of No. 7 Squadron left RAF Odiham in Hampshire, carrying paratroopers to join NATO forces serving in the Balkans; six more arrived the following week in Kosovo to support operations such as casualty evacuations and transporting vital supplies. On 12 June 1999, waves of Chinooks, escorted by Westland Lynx and American AH-64 Apache attack helicopters, were used to rapidly deploy British infantry forces into Kosovo as a part of NATO's first phase of deployment.

In May 2000, several Chinook helicopters airlifted British and European Union citizens out of Freetown in Sierra Leone in an evacuation due to regional instability. In September 2000, Chinooks were being used to evacuate casualties from fighting in Freetown to RFA Sir Percivale, a support ship docked there.

In July 2006, three Chinook helicopters of No. 27 Squadron deployed to RAF Akrotiri in Cyprus to evacuate British citizens from Lebanon; the squadron also flew the EU foreign affairs representative Javier Solana to Beirut at the start of the crisis.

In July 2018, three RAF Chinook helicopters were deployed under Operation Newcombe to assist French forces in the Northern Mali conflict with logistics and troop movement.

== Variants ==
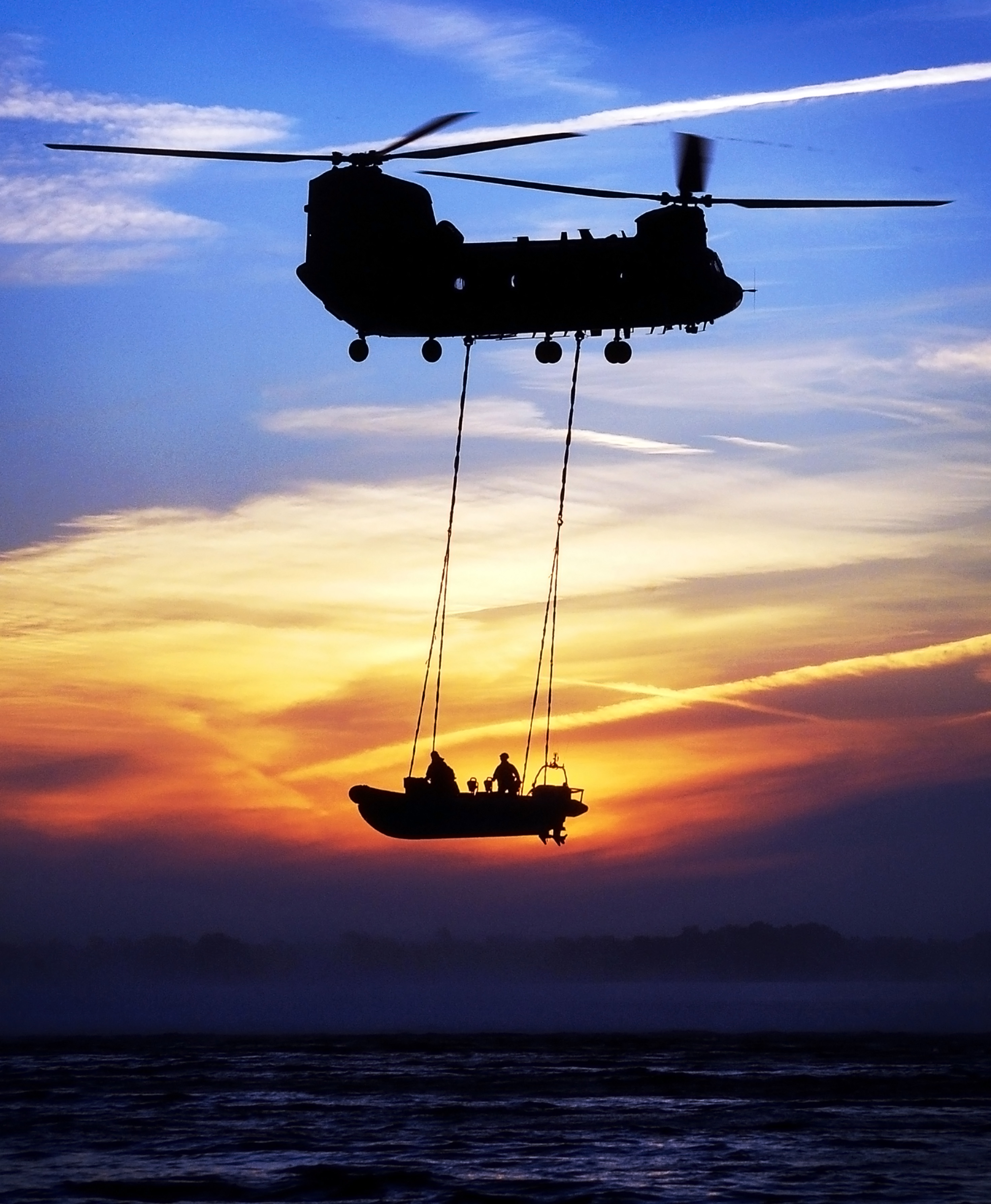
A RIB of the Royal Marines slung from a Chinook in 2009

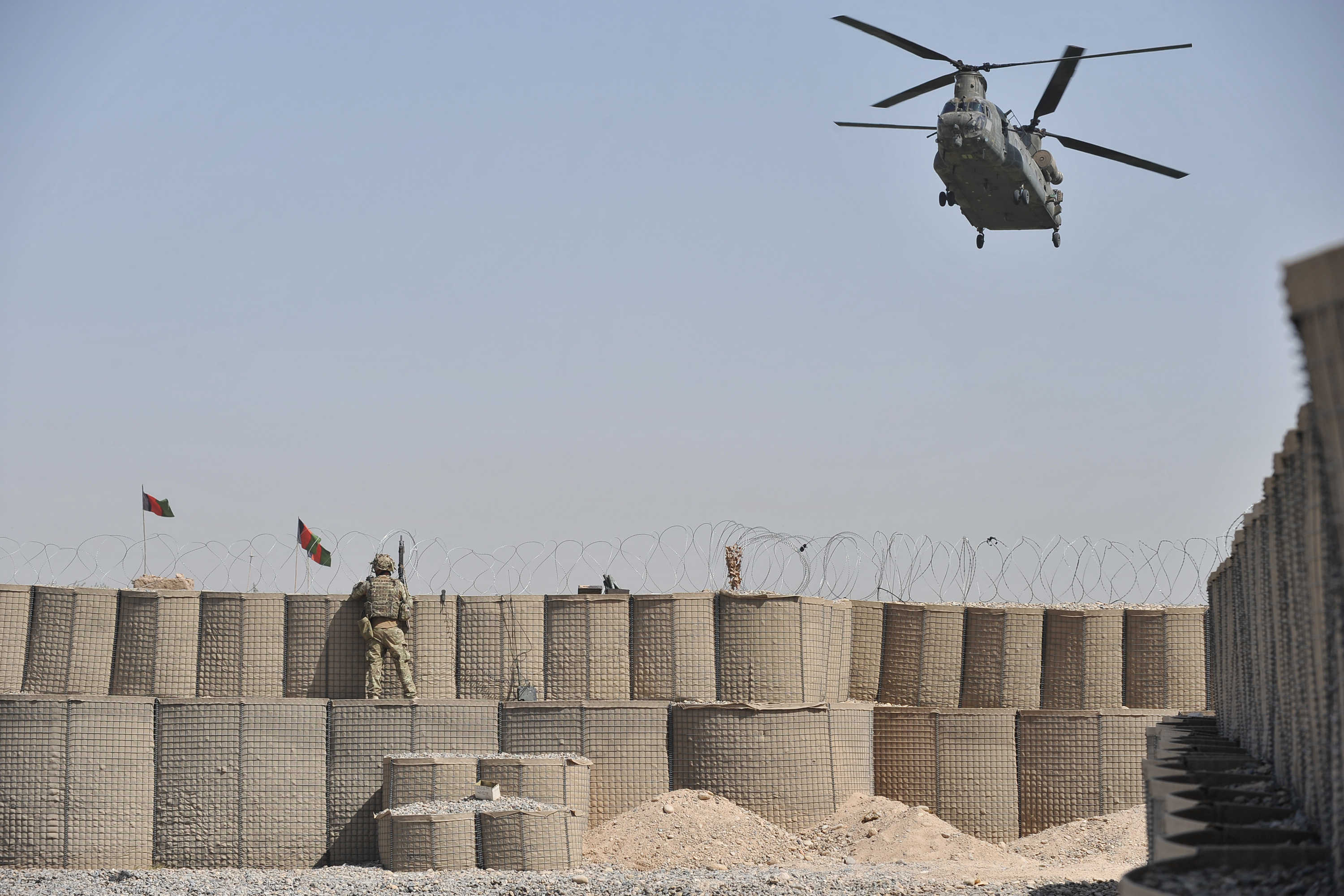
The Chinook has been the workhorse of Operation Herrick in Afghanistan

Chinook HC1
New-build aircraft for the RAF based on the CH-47C, forty-one built.
Chinook HC1B
Modification of the forty-one HC1s with metal rotor blades, survivors converted to HC2.
Chinook HC2
Conversion by Boeing of thirty-two surviving HC1Bs to CH-47D standard, and three new build-aircraft
Chinook HC2A
Similar to the HC2 with strengthened fuselage using milled structure manufacturing techniques, six built.
Chinook HC3
Special forces variant based on the CH-47SD, eight built.
Chinook HC4
HC2/2A aircraft with upgraded engines and avionics under Project Julius. Forty-six conversions planned.
Chinook HC5
HC3 aircraft with upgraded avionics under Project Julius and the replacement of the analogue flight control systems with the Boeing Digital Automatic Flight Control System (DAFCS).
Chinook HC6
New-build Chinooks announced in 2009, originally twenty-four aircraft, later reduced to fourteen (twelve new helicopters plus two attrition replacements). The final aircraft were delivered in December 2015.
Chinook HC6A
Upgrade of the HC4 Chinooks, with the replacement of the analogue flight control systems with the Boeing Digital Automatic Flight Control System (DAFCS).
Chinook H47-(ER)
14 new build H-47F Extended Range (ER) under construction for delivery in 2027. Intended for Special Operations use. Will replace oldest surviving HC6As. BAE Systems has been selected by Boeing to develop the Active Parallel Actuator Subsystem (APAS) on the CH-47F and MH-47G Chinook aircraft. The APAS award is significant for the Rochester, U.K.

== Operators ==
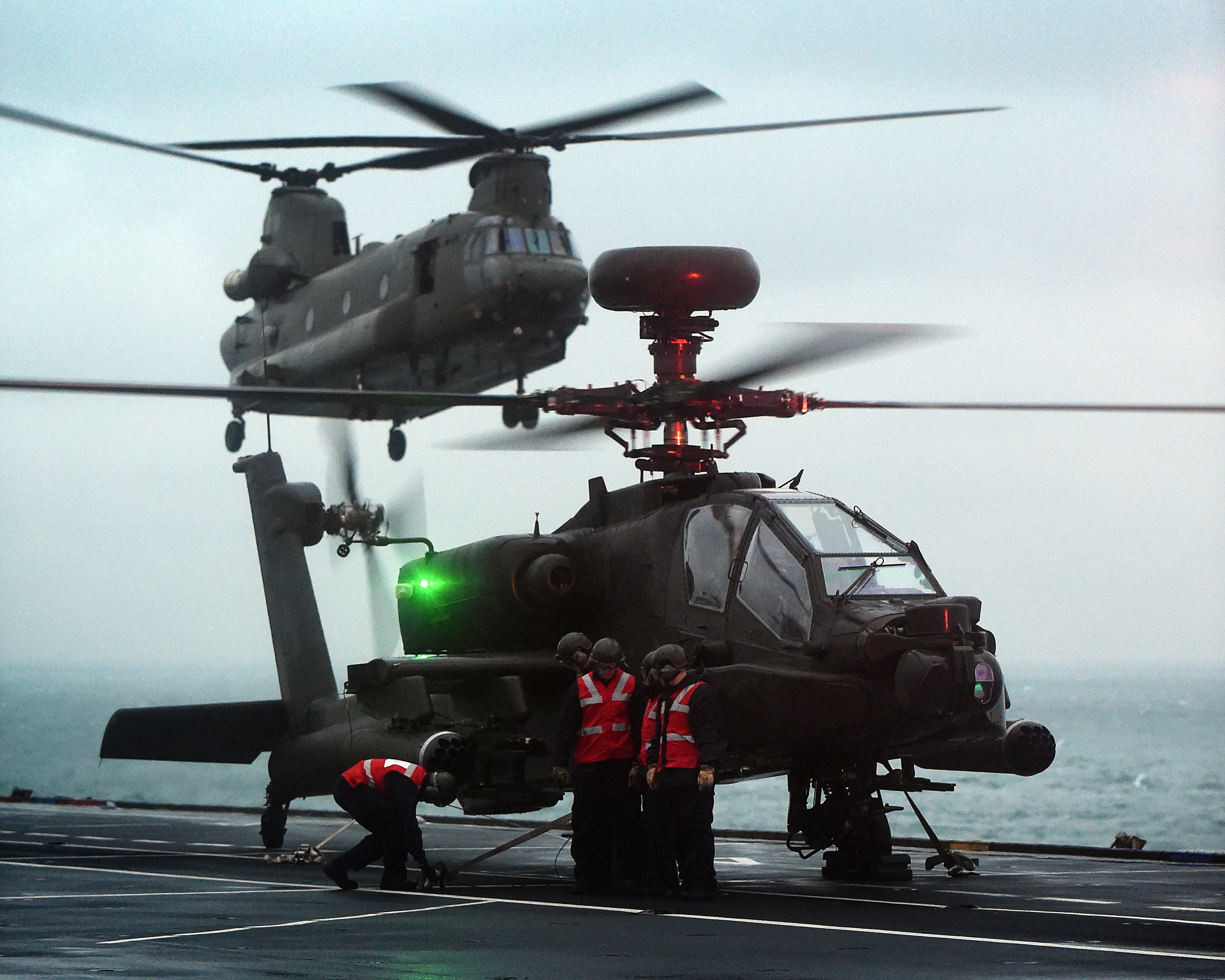
Apache and Chinook at sea on HMS Ocean in November 2014

RAF Odiham

- No. 7 Squadron – Part of the Joint Special Forces Aviation Wing
- No. 18(B) Squadron
- No. 27 Squadron
- No. 240 Operational Conversion Unit RAF – Joint Chinook and Puma HC1 Operational Conversion Unit, 1980 to 1993

RAF Benson

- No. 28 Squadron – Joint Chinook and Puma HC2 Operational Conversion Unit, 2015 onwards

== Notable incidents and accidents ==
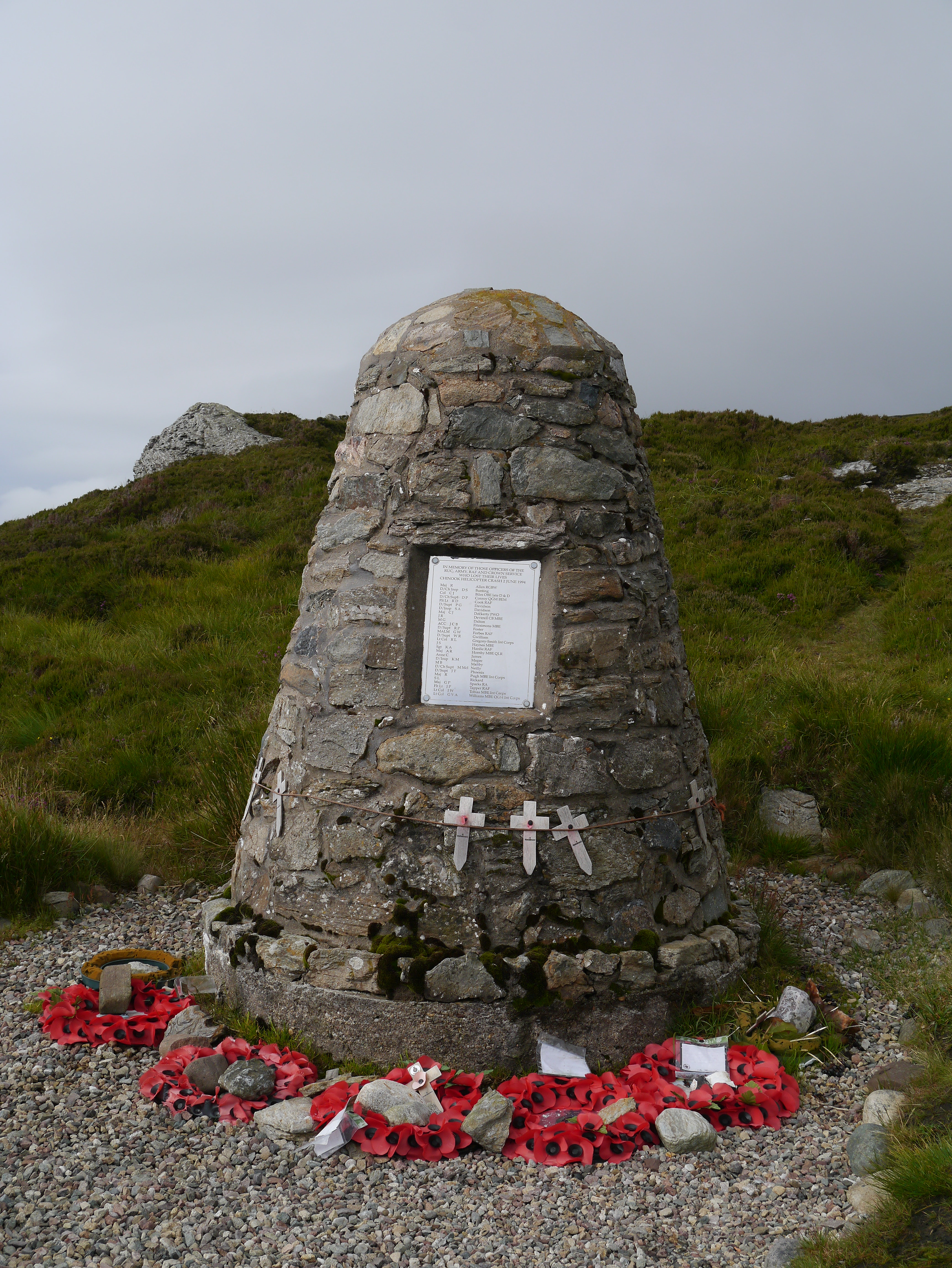
Memorial to the June 1994 crash

13 May 1986
Chinook HC1 ZA715 crashed in bad weather in the Falkland Islands. The helicopter, with four crew and twelve troops, crashed into a hill four miles from its destination. With rescuers hampered by blizzards, the personnel were recovered but one crew member had died shortly after the crash, and the co-pilot and a soldier died on the way to hospital. The board of inquiry concluded that the crew had become disorientated due to "white-out" conditions.
27 February 1987
Chinook HC1 ZA721 crashed in the Falkland Islands on a test flight following servicing. After leaving RAF Mount Pleasant, the helicopter was at a normal cruising speed and an altitude of between 300 and 700 feet when it nosed down and crashed into the ground about six kilometres south-east of the airfield; it was destroyed by a subsequent fire. The board of inquiry was unable to determine the exact cause but it may have been the forward-swivelling upper boost actuator jamming. All seven on board, three crew and four technicians, were killed.
6 May 1988
Chinook HC1 ZA672 hit a pier at Hannover Airport while taxiing into position in a confined space. Its front rotor struck the underside of Pier 10, causing the helicopter to rear up vertically and then fall on its side. A fire started at the rear of the fuselage and soon spread. Three crew members were killed and one had major injuries; the Chinook was destroyed.
2 June 1994

Chinook HC2 ZD576 crashed on the Mull of Kintyre, Scotland, killing all 25 passengers and all four crew members; the cause is disputed. It is widely regarded as the RAF's fourth-worst peacetime disaster.
19 August 2009
Chinook HC2 ZA709 made an emergency landing following a rocket propelled grenade (RPG) strike and subsequent engine fire after a cargo drop-off just north of Sangin in Helmand Province, Afghanistan. The Chinook flew two kilometres to a safe area before landing. None of the crew sustained any injuries and all evacuated the aircraft before they were rescued by a second Chinook on the same sortie. The damaged aircraft was then destroyed by coalition air strikes to prevent it falling into the hands of the Taliban.
30 August 2009
Chinook HC2 ZA673 made a hard landing while on operations near Sangin, Helmand province. It suffered damage to the undercarriage, nose and front rotor, but the crew and fifteen soldiers on board were unharmed. According to the Ministry of Defence it was not possible to safely recover the aircraft due to the location of the crash and it was destroyed with explosives deliberately. The cause of the hard landing was investigated, although it was not thought to have been shot down.

== Aircraft on display ==
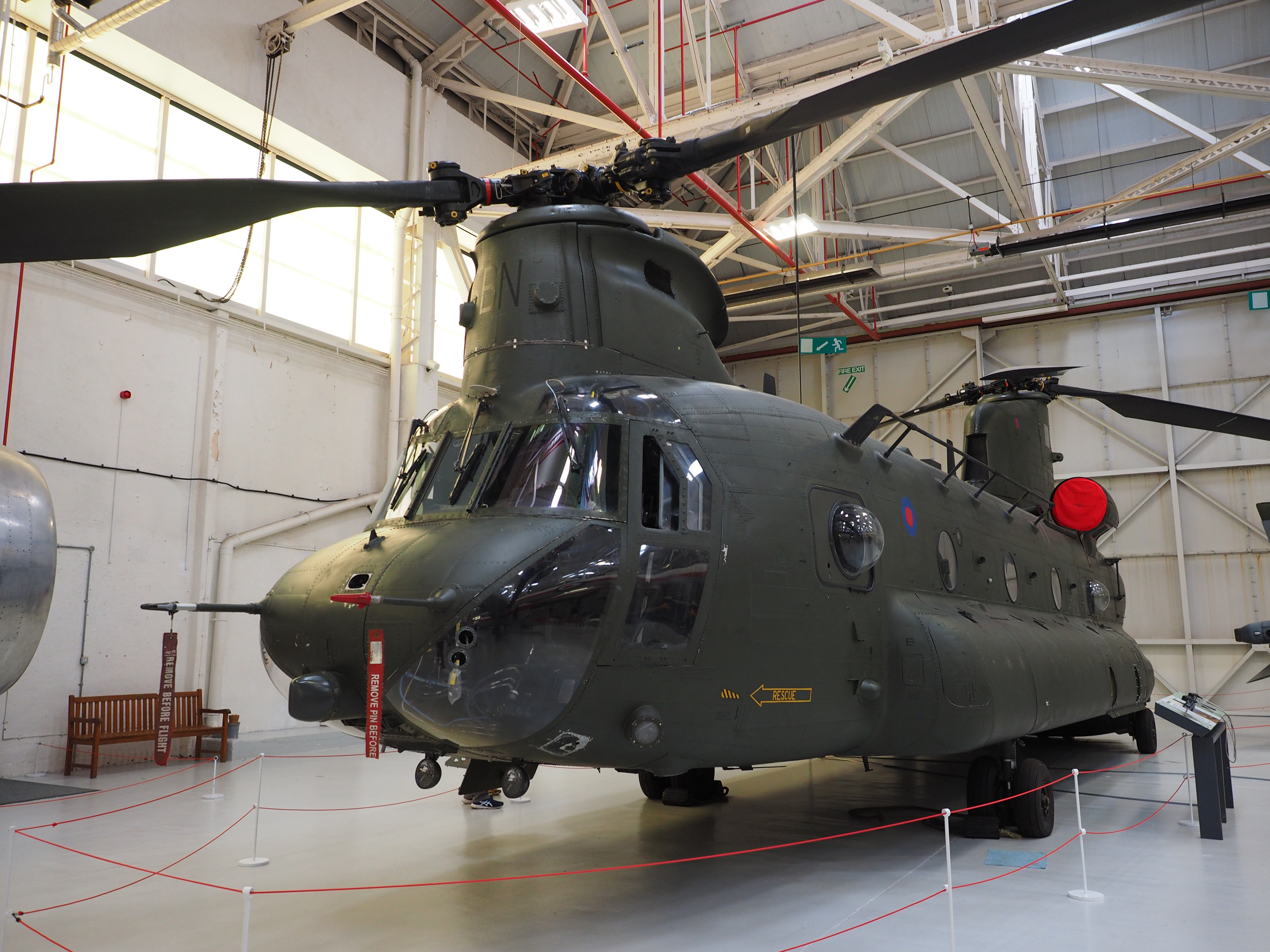
Retired RAF Chinook Bravo November on display at RAF Museum Cosford

- 83-24104 - Former US Army CH-47D forward section on display at Royal Air Force Museum London, modified to represent "Bravo November".
- ZA717 - Chinook HC.1 preserved at Newark Air Museum in Winthorpe, England.
- ZA718 - Chinook HC6A "Bravo November" on display at Royal Air Force Museum Cosford.

== Specifications (Chinook HC6A) ==
Orthographically projected diagram of the Boeing Vertol CH-47 Chinook.

Data from Royal Air Force

General characteristics

- Crew: 4 (pilot, copilot, two weapon system operators/loadmasters)
- Capacity: 55 soldiers and up to 10 tonnes of freight or equipment
- Length: 98 ft 9 in (30.10 m)
- Height: 18 ft 8 in (5.69 m)
- Empty weight: 22,450 lb (10,183 kg)
- Gross weight: 26,680 lb (12,102 kg)
- Max takeoff weight: 50,000 lb (22,680 kg)
- Powerplant: 2 × Honeywell T55-GA-714A turboshaft free-turbine engines, 3,750 shp (2,800 kW) each
- Main rotor diameter: 2 × 60 ft 0 in (18.29 m)
- Main rotor area: 5,655.2 sq ft (525.39 m^{2})
- Blade section: - root: Boeing VR-7; tip: Boeing VR-8

Performance

- Maximum speed: 160 kn (180 mph, 300 km/h)
- Range: 1,200 nmi (1,400 mi, 2,200 km) with auxiliary fuel tanks
- Service ceiling: 15,000 ft (4,600 m)
- Rate of climb: 1,980 ft/min (10.1 m/s)Thrust 2x 4,168shp each engine

Armament

- Guns: 2× M134 Miniguns and 1× M60 machine gun

=== Avionics & Defensive Aids ===
- Cockpit Avionics: Glass cockpit with a BAE Systems Digital Advanced Flight Control System (DAFCS), includes automatic modes such as auto-hover and auto-descend to ease pilot workload.
- Sensors: Electro-Optical Sensor Turret (EOST) with two infrared cameras and a low-light TV function .
- Defensive Aids: Missile Warning Receiver, Infrared Warning Receiver, Radar Warning Receiver, Counter-measure dispensing system (flares).

== See also ==
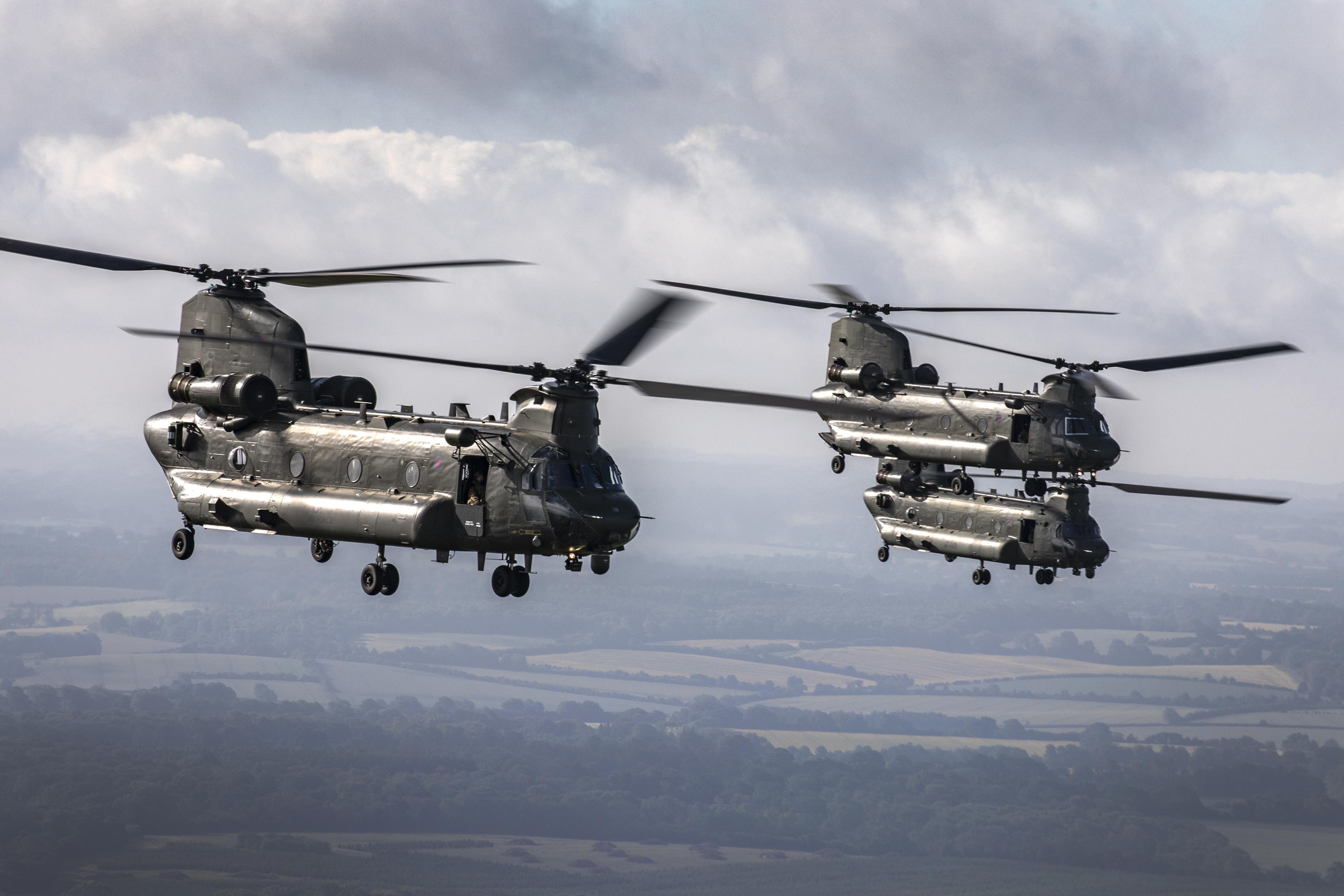
RAF Chinooks, 2020

Related development

- Boeing CH-47 Chinook

Aircraft of comparable role, configuration, and era

- Boeing Vertol CH-46 Sea Knight

Related lists

- List of active United Kingdom military aircraft
